= Turk 182 =

1985 film by Bob Clark

- Theatrical release poster by John Solie
- Directed by: Bob Clark
- Screenplay by: Denis Hamill; John Hamill; James Gregory Kingston
- Produced by: Ted Field; René Dupont
- Starring: Timothy Hutton; Robert Urich; Kim Cattrall; Robert Culp; Darren McGavin; Peter Boyle
- Cinematography: Reginald H. Morris
- Edited by: Stan Cole
- Music by: Paul Zaza
- Production companies: Interscope Communications; SLM Production Group
- Distributed by: 20th Century Fox
- Release date: February 15, 1985
- Running time: 96 minutes
- Country: United States
- Language: English
- Budget: $15 million
- Box office: $1.9 million

Turk 182 is a 1985 American action comedy-drama film directed by Bob Clark and starring Timothy Hutton, Robert Urich, Kim Cattrall, Robert Culp, and Peter Boyle. It is also one of the first movies to receive a PG-13 rating.

== Plot ==
After New York City firefighter Terry Lynch (Robert Urich) is unable to receive any compensation for an injury incurred during the off-duty rescue of a young girl, he grows suicidal. Furious, his younger brother Jimmy (Timothy Hutton) attempts to have Mayor Tyler (Robert Culp) intervene, but the corrupt politician only denounces Terry as a drunk. Determined to get justice, Terry begins a graffiti campaign of embarrassing slogans mocking the mayor, which soon captivates the imagination of the city.

== Cast ==
- Timothy Hutton as Jimmy Lynch
- Robert Urich as Terry Lynch
- Kim Cattrall as Danny Boudreau
- Robert Culp as Mayor John J. Tyler
- Darren McGavin as Det. Kowalski
- Steven Keats as Jockamo
- Paul Sorvino as himself
- Peter Boyle as Det. Ryan
- James Tolkan as Hanley
- Thomas Quinn as Hooly
- Norman Parker as Dr. Salco
- Dick O'Neill as Powerhouse chief
- Maury Chaykin as man in Wheelchair
- Richard Zobel as TV interviewer
- David Wohl as TV producer

Then-current and former members of WABC's Eyewitness News team portrayed television journalists reporting on Turk's exploits, including Roger Grimsby, Bill Beutel, Roseanne Scamardella and Tom Dunn.

== Production ==
In 1980, Dyan Cannon announced she would direct and star in the film. It was not made for another number of years, with Timothy Hutton starring and Bob Clark directing. "For me, it's a comedy," said Hutton, "because I smile in the movie... He's very much a kid, a kind of naive guy with a twinkle in his eye who goes around thinking he can get away with everything."

== Reception ==
Turk 182 was panned by critics. It holds a rating of 20% on Rotten Tomatoes based on 10 reviews. Gene Siskel of the Chicago Tribune gave the film zero stars out of four, calling it "a laughably bad, offensive movie with holes in its story that you could drive a truck through."

Patrick Goldstein of the Los Angeles Times wrote, "Just why anyone thought this garbled, improbable saga of sweet revenge would captivate moviegoers' imaginations is a mystery that calls for a studio detective, not a critic ... Bob Clark's broad brush-strokes—which worked so well in his comedies—rob the picture of what little moral authority it might originally have had, turning its characters into sitcom-style bozos and giving the story all the emotional wallop of a light-beer commercial."

Geoff Brown of The Monthly Film Bulletin wrote, "Clark's film lacks even the broad logic required of a wish-fulfillment fantasy, and skewers any conviction Timothy Hutton's aggrieved crusader might have by granting him the omnipresence and magic skills of Superman or Captain Marvel."

Janet Maslin of The New York Times stated, "Timothy Hutton has turned into an actor worth watching in anything — even in Turk 182!, a movie with a sloppily sentimental heart that's as big as the city in which its story takes place."

Clay Warnick of The Washington Post was somewhat positive, writing, "The struggle is interesting not because the heroes are appealing, or because their cause seems particularly valid, but because of Robert Culp's expert performance as the villainous mayor of New York."

In one of the film's rare wholly positive reviews, Variety stated, "Besides its compelling storyline, Turk 182 features outstanding performances across the board, with Hutton perfect in the role of the determined unassuming hero. He and Urich are very convincing as brothers with an unusually strong bond, and Urich draws a very accurate and sometimes moving picture, particularly during hospital scenes."

The film received two Golden Raspberry Award nominations for Robert Urich for Worst Supporting Actor and Worst Musical Score for Paul Zaza, losing to Rob Lowe for St. Elmo's Fire and Vince DiCola for Rocky IV respectively.

== See also ==
- List of firefighting films
- TAKI 183
- Queensboro Bridge
