= Tex Antoine =

American weatherman

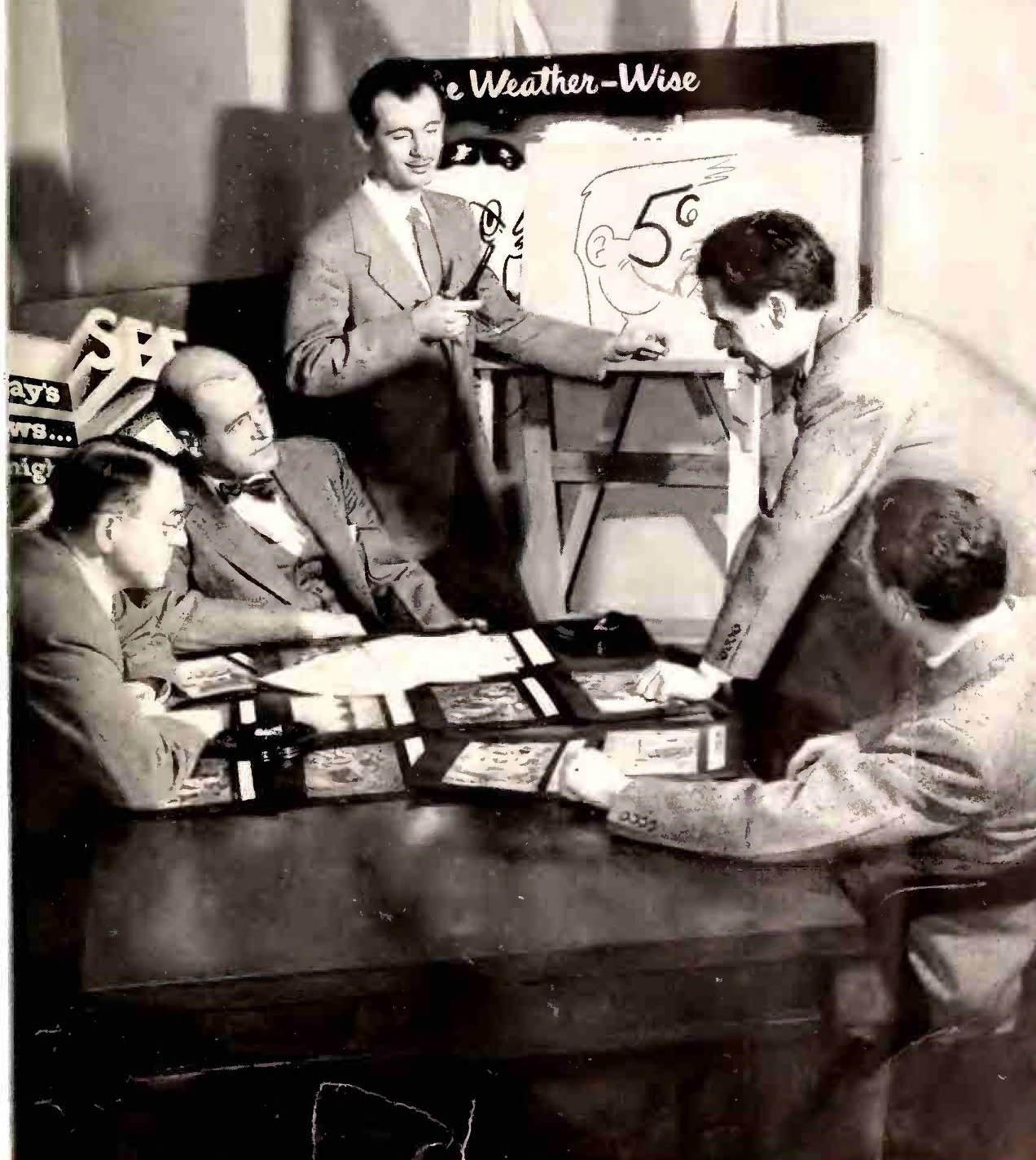
- Tex Antoine (standing, pointing to map) on the cover of Sponsor Magazine, December 3, 1951. Seen with advertising executives.
- Born: Herbert John Antoine Jr. April 21, 1923; Evanston, Illinois, U.S.
- Died: January 12, 1983 (aged 59); Manhattan, New York City, U.S.
- Occupation: Weatherman
- Spouse: Suzannah C. Glidden (1965–)
- Children: Nancy Antoine Shaffin
- Parent(s): Herbert Jon Antoine Sr. (1894–1970); Bertha Campbell

Herbert John Antoine Jr. (April 21, 1923 – January 12, 1983), known professionally as Tex Antoine, was an American weatherman on New York City television for nearly three decades. He also served for many years as a radio announcer.

== Early life and career ==
Antoine was born Herbert John Antoine Jr., in Evanston, Illinois, and was raised in California and Texas. His father was Herbert Jon Antoine Sr. (1894–1972), an auto supply salesman. His mother was Bertha Campbell, and by 1930 the family was living in Los Angeles.

Antoine (whose nickname "Tex" came from his growing up in Texas) first joined NBC in New York as a page in 1943, and a year later became a staff announcer for the network. He was the first announcer, beginning in 1944, for the long-running religious drama The Eternal Light. His run with the program ended in 1945. His other radio announcing credits include The Adventures of Archie Andrews and The Adventures of Frank Merriwell. In the mid-1950s he was sometimes recruited as announcer for the NBC network's College Quiz Bowl series.

=== The WNBT / WRCA-TV / WNBC years (1949–1966) ===
Antoine began his weather career in 1949 on WNBT (later WRCA-TV, now WNBC), working with a cartoon sidekick known as "Uncle Wethbee" (sometimes misspelled "Uncle Weatherbee").

Antoine's theme music was "Fine and Dandy." Originally, Antoine used several records to reflect the weather of the day. ("Stormy Weather," "Let it Snow", etc.) However, all of the records but one became damaged or broken and he was left with "Fine and Dandy". The theme served him for years.

According to a reminiscence by Bob Tilden, Antoine's nightly weather report "was a wonderful mix of weather, cartoon art, and storytelling. He would start his weather segment standing next to an easel covered by blank papers, and he would proceed to draw the weather systems that were pertinent to the nation and the area. As his hands drew in the lows, highs, and fronts, his voice would narrate their past and expected movements, and what their effects would be. As he filled page after page of the easel, building the map as he described each feature, he engaged his audience. He instructed the viewers about their weather, rather than just informing them of a forecast."

Antoine also entertained viewers during each report by writing the temperature in large numerals on his big blank pad, then embellishing with the marker as his weather narrative proceeded until the numeral had finally become part of a whimsical cartoon illustrating some facet of the day's weather or forecast.

=== To WABC-TV ===
In 1966, Antoine moved from WNBC to WABC-TV to report the weather during newscasts anchored by Scott Vincent. Antoine was not allowed to plug his new home on his final channel 4 broadcast. So, with Uncle Wethbee's Magic Marker in hand, he said and wrote something to the effect of: "Remember that 4 plus 3 equals 7, and that's as easy as ABC."

In 1968, WABC-TV revamped all its newscasts under the banner of Eyewitness News. Its new news director, Al Primo, decreed that all the newscast's on-camera talent would wear matching blue blazers with a "circle 7" crest displayed on their jacket pockets. When Antoine, who up to that point wore smocks on the air, protested that it would affect his image, Primo retorted (as recounted in 1974 by sportswriter Frank Deford), "Either everybody wears blazers or everybody wears smocks." Antoine would thereafter wear a blazer on the air.

=== Rape quip and final years ===
On November 24, 1976, on the 6 p.m. broadcast, Antoine's weather report immediately followed a story about the attempted rape of an eight-year-old girl. Antoine thereupon quipped: "With rape so predominant in the news lately, it is well to remember the words of Confucius: 'If rape is inevitable, lie back and enjoy it'."

Within 25 minutes of the comment, the station received 665 calls from mostly irate viewers about Antoine's insensitive comment. Despite the on-air apology, WABC wasted no time suspending Antoine. Roger Grimsby and Bill Beutel led the 11 p.m. newscast that night with the official apology from WABC-TV. After the station apology, another 450 calls were made, including a quarter in favor of not suspending Antoine after making the on-air apology. The comment was not the first occurrence of controversial remarks by Antoine. In February 1974, over 100 calls were sent in for the broadcaster using a profanity on an open microphone. A day later, network executives hinted that they would probably forgive Antoine for the controversial remark.

With Antoine off the air, weatherman Storm Field became the evening weather forecaster. Grimsby, introducing Storm Field, quipped "Lie back, relax, and enjoy the weather with Storm Field." While the reaction to Grimsby's statement was not as severe as Antoine's, the impact of the statement offended women as well. The newspapers noted that Ellen Bradley, a rape victim and a secretary at the station, wrote Grimsby a stern note about making such a comment on air.

On December 2, 1976, while Antoine was on a no-pay vacation in the United States Virgin Islands island of St. Thomas, it was reported that ABC executives told Antoine that he would not lose his job. Despite this report, a week later, WABC told the press that no final decision had been made. Protests were being held in front of the ABC headquarters from the National Organization for Women (NOW), who demanded that Antoine be fired. The decision was announced on December 18 to reinstate Antoine in a non-televised role. Instead of forecasting on television, he would assist Storm Field (who was hired in March 1976) with forecast production. However, his contract expired in March 1977 and was not renewed by the station.

Antoine closed out his career in 1978 with a brief stint as weatherman for WNEW-TV.

== Personal life ==
Antoine married Suzannah C. Glidden in summer 1965. He died at his Park Avenue apartment in 1983 at age 59.
