= Kaity Tong =

American broadcast journalist

- Born: July 23, 1947 (age 79); Qingdao, China
- Education: Bryn Mawr College (BA); Stanford University (MA)
- Occupation: American television journalist/news anchor
- Spouse(s): Robert Long (divorced); 1 child Patrick Callahan (divorced)
- Children: Philip Long
- Relatives: Hollington Tong (great-uncle)
- Family: George and Anita Tong (parents)

Kaity Tong (Chinese: 董恺悌; pinyin: Dǒng Kǎitì; born July 23, 1947) is a Chinese-born American former broadcast journalist. She was a television news anchor in New York City from 1981 to 2026.

== Early life ==
Kaity (pronounced "kite-ee") Tong was born in Qingdao, China and arrived in the United States with her family at age four. Her parents anglicized their names to George and Anita Tong. She became a United States citizen in 1985. Growing up in Washington, D.C., she was inspired to become a journalist by her great-uncle, Hollington Tong, an ambassador to the US from China as well as an acclaimed author. Her mother worked for the Voice of America as a broadcaster and producer in Washington, D.C.

Kaity attended Bryn Mawr College on an academic scholarship. She graduated with honors with a Bachelor of Arts degree in English literature. She was accepted to the doctoral program of Stanford University in Chinese and Japanese literature, and she intended to be an instructor in English literature. However, while at Stanford, Tong began her broadcasting career, getting what she thought would be a summer job as morning editor and producer for KPIX-TV All-News Radio in San Francisco. The summer job turned into a year-long stint at the radio station which was the top all-news station in San Francisco. Tong managed to complete her master's degree in Asian studies but was sidetracked by the news business.

== Career ==
Tong's television career began as a reporter for KPIX-TV in San Francisco, where she worked from 1976 to 1979. Originally hired as a writer for the station, Tong was asked to do an on-air test and was immediately promoted to a street reporter, where her first on-air story was a report on the new carts that transported people around the airport. In December 1979, she became co-anchor of the 5 p.m. and 11 p.m. newscasts on KCRA-TV in Sacramento, California where she soon became number one-rated out of all the television news personalities in Sacramento.

Referring to the difficulties of having a family and career, she said at the time: "Anchoring is fun. At one time I wanted to be a network reporter, but now I think that is too difficult a life. One of these days I want to have a baby."

=== WABC-TV ===
In 1981, she moved to WABC-TV in New York City. Within two years, she became co-anchor of the station's 5 p.m. and 11 p.m. newscasts, first with Tom Snyder from 1983 to 1984 and later with Ernie Anastos until 1986.

She moved to the 6 p.m. newscast, rotating the anchor chair with John Johnson alongside Bill Beutel after Roger Grimsby was fired in 1986, while still co-anchoring the 11 p.m. broadcast with Anastos until he left for WCBS in 1989. Eventually her sole anchor role was the 11 p.m. news, as Beutel became solo anchor of the 6 p.m. broadcast. In 1984, she appeared as herself, reporting on the defection of the Soviet circus performer played by Robin Williams in feature film Moscow on the Hudson. She has also played a newscaster in Wolf, City Hall, Marci X, Night Falls on Manhattan, and the 2004 remake of The Manchurian Candidate.

Her firing from WABC-TV in 1991 caused considerable outrage. She was replaced by Susan Roesgen, who came from a small Midwestern station and who never adjusted to New York, lasting only a year on WABC-TV. A "Coalition of Asian-American New Yorkers" suggested that Tong's Chinese-American background was the reason. Other supporters of Tong cited her age, which was over 40 at the time, as a main reason for her firing. Station management stated that Tong was released due to her high salary which was $750,000 per year at the time (the equivalent to $1,353,965 in 2017). Capital Cities/ABC chairman Thomas Murphy said it was "strictly a business decision."

According to Tong, her direct boss Channel 7 Vice President and General Manager Walter Liss acknowledged that Tong's newscast at 11 p.m. had the highest ranking in that time slot, but he wanted "...a much bigger No. 1", and had a vision of what the ideal look of how television should be in the 1990s. Tong declined to repeat specifically what Liss's vision was, other than to say, "I am trying hard to take the high road in all of this."

=== WPIX ===
In early 1992, Tong joined WPIX as the station's top female anchor until her retirement on August 30, 2026. She co-anchored the station's 10 p.m. newscast with Marvin Scott from January 1992 to September 1992, with Jack Cafferty from September 1992 to October 1998, and with Jim Watkins from October 1998 to 2010, when Watkins was fired.

She has since been weekend anchor for the station. Tong was involved in a 2010 lawsuit by former news director Karen Scott against WPIX for age discrimination when Scott and other veteran broadcast personnel lost their jobs, later testifying in court.

In January 2016, Tong returned to weekdays, co-anchoring a new 6:30 p.m. newscast alongside longtime former WWOR anchor Brenda Blackmon. However, in September 2016, the newscast was cancelled and Tong was moved back to weekends.

On Tuesday, August 4, 2026 she announced that would retire at the end of this month after being with the network for 34 years. Her final newscast was on Sunday, August 30, 2026.

== Awards ==
Tong joined Gloria Steinem and Beverly Sills in receiving the Exceptional Achievement Award from The Women's Project. She was the first woman honored by Rotary International with its Paul Harris Fellowship. She was also honored with a Star award by the New York Women's Agenda. She has been recognized by the Chinese America Arts Council for her excellence in communication.

She received a Distinguished Woman award from the Chinese-American Planning Council, and a Champion of Excellence Award from the Organization of Chinese Americans. A naturalized citizen, Tong received the Ellis Island Medal of Honor for her work.

In 2018, the New York Chapter of the National Academy of Television Arts and Sciences awarded Tong the Governor's Emmy Award “for her four decades of presenting the news with integrity and compassion.” Tong has received several Emmy Awards over the years, including Outstanding Event Coverage for "9/11 America Remembers" in 2003 and Outstanding Single Newscast over 35 Minutes for "WB11 News at 10: 9/11 Day of Tribute" in 2004.

Her name has inspired many first-generation Chinese-American parents to name their New York-born children after her. However, it is often anglicized as Katie.

== Personal life ==
Tong has a son from her first marriage to Robert Long, former news director and a vice-president at Los Angeles's KNBC-TV until September 25, 2009. She later married photographer Patrick Callahan until their divorce.

She is also 77th generation descendant of the Chinese philosopher Confucius.

== See also ==
- Chinese Americans in New York City
- New Yorkers in journalism
