= Diana Williams =

American TV journalist (born 1958)

- Born: July 18, 1958 (age 68); Columbus, Ohio, U.S.
- Education: Duke University
- Occupation: Television news anchor

Diana Williams (born July 18, 1958) is a retired American television journalist. She was a news anchor at WABC television in New York City, where she co-anchored the one-hour 5 p.m. Eyewitness News broadcast. She also hosted the Sunday morning public-affairs program Eyewitness News Up Close with Diana Williams, which aired at 11 a.m.

== Biography ==
Williams graduated from Duke University in Durham, North Carolina, in 1980 with a degree in economics.

After interning at WTVD in Durham, Williams began her television career in Charlotte, North Carolina, where she worked as a reporter at WSOC and then as a weeknight anchor at 6 p.m. and 11 p.m. at WBTV. From 1987 to 1991, she worked at WNEV (now WHDH) in Boston, Massachusetts.

=== WABC ===
Williams joined WABC in 1991 as a reporter and eventually became a weekend anchor. Within a year, she was a co-anchor of the station's 11 p.m. Eyewitness News newscast with Bill Beutel. In 1999, Williams joined Beutel on the 6 p.m. newscast as well, becoming Beutel's first co-anchor at 6 p.m. since the departure of Roger Grimsby in 1986.

Beginning in 1999, she co-anchored the 11 p.m. newscast with Bill Ritter, later doing the 6 p.m. newscast with him in 2001, as well, following Beutel's retirement. Williams joined the 5 p.m. newscast in 2003, first alongside Roz Abrams, and later with Sade Baderinwa.

She has traveled the world covering stories for Eyewitness News, including to Ireland and Israel to report on conflicts. But most of her travels were with Pope John Paul II, most notably, his historic visit to Israel in 2000. Williams also traveled with the Pope to Baltimore, Mexico City and Toronto. She covered the September 11 attacks and for its tenth anniversary in 2011.

Williams has also covered politics extensively, from the fall of New York Governor Eliot Spitzer in 2008; to the elections of New York City Mayor Michael Bloomberg in 2001, 2005 and 2009; and New Jersey Governor Chris Christie in 2009. She has been to every U.S. presidential nominating convention beginning with the 1992 Democratic National Convention in New York City.

She won an Emmy Award for her half-hour special called Dangerous Crossings that focused on the immigration issues along the Mexican and Arizona border. She has also won awards for her yearly breast cancer specials and has hosted the "Making Strides against Breast Cancer" Walk(s) for the American Cancer Society for over 17 years.

After 29 years, Williams announced her retirement on the air. She anchored her final newscast on September 12, 2019.

== See also ==
- List of American journalists
- List of climbers, alpinists and mountaineers
- List of Duke University people
- List of people from Boston
- List of people from Charlotte
- List of people from New York City
