= Joe Torres (journalist) =

American journalist and news anchor at WABC-TV

Joe Torres (born June 2, 1963 in Brooklyn, New York) is an American journalist and author of Puerto Rican ancestry.

Torres is a news anchor and reporter for WABC-TV in New York. Torres serves as a reporter and occasional substitute anchor (usually substituting for Bill Ritter) on the station's weeknight Eyewitness News broadcast, as well as anchoring the station's Saturday and Sunday night newscasts with Sandra Bookman. Torres also hosts Tiempo, WABC's long-running Hispanic-centric current affairs program that airs on Sunday mornings. Torres received particular acclaim for his coverage of the September 11 attacks.

== Career ==
Prior to his joining WABC-TV, Torres worked at WSAV-TV in Savannah, Georgia, WNEP-TV in Scranton-Wilkes-Barre, and WPVI-TV in Philadelphia. He is a graduate of SUNY Brockport where he played intercollegiate soccer and John Jay High School in Cross River, NY where he was a member of the varsity soccer, basketball and baseball teams.
