= AM America =

1975 American morning TV news program

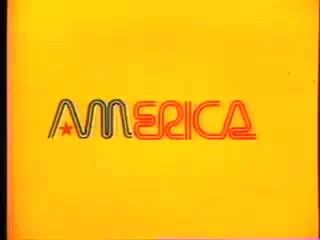
- Starring: Bill Beutel; Stephanie Edwards; Peter Jennings
- Theme music composer: William Goldstein
- Opening theme: "Spirit of '76 (A.M. America)"
- Country of origin: United States

Production
- Running time: 120 minutes (two hours) (including commercials, and local news/weather cut-ins [on some affiliates])

Original release
- Network: ABC
- Release: January 6 – October 31, 1975

Related
- Good Morning America (1975–present)

AM America was a morning news program produced by ABC in an attempt to compete with the highly rated Today on NBC. Premiering on January 6, 1975, the show never found an audience against Today or the CBS combo of the CBS Morning News and Captain Kangaroo. Lasting just under ten months, its final installment aired on October 31. It was replaced the following Monday, November 3, by Good Morning America.

== History ==
The program's concept was based on Ralph Story's AM, the local morning show on the network's owned-and-operated Los Angeles station KABC-TV. Like Today, AM America employed two hosts and a news anchor. Originally selected in August 1974 as cohosts were Bill Beutel who was co-anchor of Eyewitness News on the network's New York City flagship station WABC-TV, Stephanie Edwards from Ralph Story's AM and Bob Kennedy who hosted morning talk show Kennedy and Company on Chicago's WLS-TV. Kennedy died of bone cancer on November 5, 1974, just two months prior to the series' debut, and was eventually replaced by ABC's Washington correspondent Peter Jennings who provided the news reports.

One notable episode of AM America aired on April 25, 1975, when members of the British comedy troupe Monty Python, with the exception of John Cleese who had temporarily left the group, made one of their earliest appearances on American television. The program ended with the Pythons attempting to tear apart the set and abscond with everything that wasn't nailed down, including Edwards.

Edwards quit the show by the end of May, and Beutel followed her out a few months later. On November 3, the Monday following its final broadcast, it was replaced with a more well-known, more successful effort, Good Morning America.

== Logo ==
The logo for AM America had the letters A and M colored in blue while the rest of the word "America" was colored in red. The "AM" overlapped with "America". A star was placed inside the "A".

== Theme music ==
The series' theme music was "Spirit Of '76 (AM America)," an instrumental composed by William Goldstein which was released as a single for Motown in November 1975.

== Franchising ==
The AM (city name) name was franchised to ABC stations across the United States, for locally produced morning talk programs (which generally aired during the 9 a.m. hour, after the national program ended; they generally had one or two hosts, and most had a live studio audience, especially during the 1980s).

- AM Los Angeles, the successor to Ralph Story's AM, featured Regis Philbin and Sarah Purcell. Purcell was replaced by Cyndy Garvey in 1978, and the show moved to New York City in 1983 (where it replaced AM New York), eventually evolving into the current Live with Kelly and Mark. After the departures of Philbin and Garvey, AM Los Angeles continued on KABC-TV featuring at various points Paul Moyer, Ann Martin, Harold Greene, Steve Edwards, Patty Duke, Cristina Ferrare and Tawny Little until 1991 when the program was replaced by Live with Regis and Kathie Lee.
- WLS-TV's AM Chicago (itself a successor to the Kennedy and Company series hosted by Bob Kennedy, who would have been an AM America co-host prior to his unexpected death), hosted by (among others) Sandi Freeman, Steve Edwards, John Barbour, Robb Weller, Tim Weigel, John Callaway and Oprah Winfrey. The program evolved into The Oprah Winfrey Show which aired in the former AM Chicago time slot from 1986 to 2011. After Oprah ended, WLS-TV premiered Windy City Live which aired in the same time slot until 2013 when it was replaced by Live with Kelly and Michael (now Live with Kelly and Mark).
- WXYZ-TV had an AM Detroit in the mid-1970s (hosted by Dennis Wholey) which was replaced by Kelly & Company, with former Action News co-anchorman John Kelly and weathercaster Marilyn Turner (a husband-and-wife team), which ran through the early 1990s.
- KGO-TV's AM San Francisco (aired from 1975 to 1988) featured the husband-and-wife team of Fred LaCosse and Terry Lowry. Nancy Fleming co-hosted for a period in the 1970s. Before 1975, the program was simply called AM and was hosted by Jim Dunbar (best known for being a longtime personality for KGO radio). Other hosts of AM San Francisco included Suzanne Somers, Jim Lange and Maury Povich. The show was renamed Good Morning Bay Area in 1988 and ran under this title until being replaced by Live with Regis and Kathie Lee.
- WKBW-TV's AM Buffalo, which replaced a Dialing for Dollars franchise, aired on that station from 1978 to 2023.
- Additionally, KATU in Portland has aired AM Northwest since the debut of AM America. There also was a short lived AM Northwest program on Seattle's KOMO-TV (sister station to KATU) in either the 1980s or 1990s. The KATU and KOMO-TV versions had different hosts and guests, but the debut broadcast on KOMO included on air interaction with the hosts at AM Northwest in Portland.
- Some non-ABC affiliated stations such as CBS affiliate KHOU in Houston and then-NBC owned-and-operated station WKYC in Cleveland formerly used the AM branding for their respectively programs AM Houston and AM Cleveland, respectively (in Houston, ABC owned-and-operated station KTRK-TV, had used Good Morning Houston for its early morning local program).
