= WITN-TV =

Television station in Washington, North Carolina

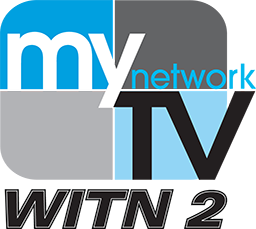
- Washington–Greenville–New Bern–Jacksonville, North Carolina; United States
- City: Washington, North Carolina
- Channels: Digital: 34 (UHF); Virtual: 7
- Branding: WITN 7; MyTV WITN 2 (7.2); MeTV Eastern Carolina (7.3)

Programming
- Affiliations: 7.1: NBC; 7.2: Independent with MyNetworkTV; for others, see § Subchannels

Ownership
- Owner: Gray Media; (Gray Television Licensee, LLC)
- Sister stations: W27DP-D

History
- First air date: September 28, 1955
- Former call signs: WITN (1955–1978)
- Former channel numbers: Analog: 7 (VHF, 1955–2009); Digital: 32 (UHF, until 2019)
- Former affiliations: ABC (secondary, 1955–1963)
- Call sign meaning: Washington or Eyewitness News

Technical information
- Licensing authority: FCC
- Facility ID: 594
- ERP: 1,000 kW
- HAAT: 591.9 m (1,942 ft)
- Transmitter coordinates: 35°21′55.9″N 77°23′34.6″W

Links
- Public license information: Public file; LMS
- Website: www.witn.com

WITN-TV (channel 7) is a television station licensed to Washington, North Carolina, United States, serving Eastern North Carolina as an affiliate of NBC and MyNetworkTV. Owned by Gray Media, the station has primary studio facilities on East Arlington Boulevard in Greenville, with an additional studio in New Bern. Its transmitter is located in Grifton Township along NC 118.

== History ==
The station signed on September 28, 1955, from facilities on US 17 in Chocowinity (outside Washington, though with a Washington mailing address). It was the area's second television outlet to launch after Greenville's WNCT-TV (channel 9). It was an NBC affiliate from the start but shared secondary ABC relations with WNCT until the 1963 sign-on of WNBE-TV (channel 12, now WCTI-TV) in New Bern. WITN's first broadcast was game 1 of the 1955 World Series.

WITN aired an analog signal on VHF channel 7 from the region's highest transmitter at that time. The station was originally owned by North Carolina Television, a consortium of radio stations from Northeastern North Carolina. Majority ownership was held by the Roberson family, owners of WITN radio (930 AM, now WDLX; and FM 93.3, now WERO).

The group held onto the television station until 1985, when it was sold to AFLAC. It added the "-TV" suffix to its call sign on July 31, 1978. In 1997, AFLAC sold its broadcasting group to Retirement Systems of Alabama which merged with Ellis Communications to form Raycom Media. However, Raycom could not keep WITN for long due to a significant signal overlap with Wilmington's WECT, an Ellis property that was part of the deal. WITN's city-grade signal reaches the northern portion of the Wilmington market. At the time, the FCC normally did not allow one company to own two stations with overlapping signals, and would not even consider a waiver for a city-grade overlap. What was then known as Gray Communications (now Gray Television) bought the station later in 1997. It has been broadcasting a full-power digital signal since June 2006. They eventually reunited in 2019 after Gray acquired Raycom, but by then, overlaps of signals were not considered as long as the stations were in separate markets.

On January 7, 2009, a high definition feed of WITN-TV was launched on DirecTV and can now also be obtained on Dish Network. WITN-TV ended regular programming over its analog signal, over VHF channel 7, on June 12, 2009, the official date on which full-power television stations in the United States transitioned from analog to digital broadcasts under federal mandate. The station's digital signal remained on its pre-transition UHF channel 32, using virtual channel 7. As part of the SAFER Act, WITN-TV kept its analog signal on the air until June 26 to inform viewers of the digital television transition through a loop of public service announcements from the National Association of Broadcasters. In June 2013, the station moved from its longtime home outside Washington to new high definition-ready studios in Greenville.

In addition to offering network and syndicated programming, WITN was also a multimedia rights partner for East Carolina University Athletics from 1998 to 2014. In addition to hosting the weekly coaches' shows for football and basketball, the station produced live broadcasts of select games that were not picked up nationally by ESPN as part of its deal with Conference USA. Even though most of the broadcasts were limited to its own market, WITN got other television outlets throughout North Carolina to carry a football game in 2003 which saw ECU competing against in-state rival University of North Carolina at Chapel Hill from Dowdy–Ficklen Stadium. In 2014, WNCT-TV picked up the ECU sports package, just as the school moved its programs to the American Athletic Conference.

== WITN-DT2 ==
WITN-DT2 is the MyNetworkTV-affiliated second digital subchannel of WITN-TV, broadcasting in standard definition on channel 7.2.

=== History ===
Originally, WITN-DT2 served as a 24-hour local weather channel. It picked up MyNetworkTV on September 28, 2009, after the area's Ion Television owned-and-operated station WEPX-TV, channel 38 (and its full-time satellite, WPXU-TV, channel 35) dropped the programming service. At that point, local weather programming was reduced to overnights and mornings while syndicated offerings made up the rest of WITN-DT2's schedule. A further addition to that service occurred April 18, 2011, when it added MeTV and dropped all remaining weather-related programming with the new network taking up most of the weekend and daytime schedule.

Eventually, a new third digital subchannel signed on and began offering a 24-hour live feed of WITN's own Doppler weather radar. On January 17, 2013, it separated programming from MyNetworkTV and MeTV onto dedicated digital subchannels (with MeTV relocating to the third subchannel).

For a period of time, WITN-DT2 could also be seen on the digital tier of Time Warner Cable in the greater Wilmington area since that market's MyNetworkTV affiliate, W47CK, was technically ineligible for carriage on cable providers due to its low-power status. As a result, the clearance allowed WITN-DT2 to unofficially serve as Wilmington's MyNetworkTV outlet (since, at that time, there was no station affiliated with the service in that area). Eventually, Time Warner Cable (now Charter Spectrum) picked up W47CK and subsequently dropped WITN-DT2 from the lineup.

== News operation ==
In terms of Nielsen ratings, Eastern North Carolina is usually not very competitive during sweeps periods. Historically, WITN has been the #1 ranked newscast in the Greenville–Washington–New Bern market.

The station's direct competitors are WCTI-TV and WNCT-TV. There have been occasions that WITN has come in 2nd place in ratings. WITN News ranked 2nd in the market to WCTI in 2014, before regaining 1st place in 2015. In July 2008, WNCT was the most watched television station in the market after taking first place weeknights at 6 and 11. However, since then, WNCT has fallen to 3rd place weeknights at 6.

While broadcasting from its original facility in Chocowinity, WITN maintained secondary studios in Greenville on East Arlington Boulevard (within the Square Shopping Center) less than two blocks from its current base of operations. This location began broadcasting a weekday morning newscast in 1997 featuring a news anchor, meteorologist, and photographer based out of there. In addition, weeknight interview segments were conducted from the old secondary studios.

After moving into its brand new facility in Greenville on June 5, 2013, WITN became the area's second television outlet to upgrade news production to high definition level. In addition to its main studios in Greenville, the station operates news bureaus in Jacksonville (on Valencia Drive) and in New Bern (on Middle Street).

=== Notable former on-air staff ===
- John Beard – news anchor (1972–1976)
- David Crabtree – anchor/reporter (1985–1988)
- Susan Roesgen

== Technical information ==
=== Subchannels ===
The station's signal is multiplexed:

Subchannels of WITN-TV
Channel	Res.	Short name	Programming
7.1	1080i	WITN-DT	NBC
7.2	720p	WITN-MY	Independent with MyNetworkTV
7.3	480i	WITN-ME	MeTV
7.4	480i	STARTTV	Start TV
7.5	480i	HEROES	Heroes & Icons
7.6	480i	THE365	365BLK
7.7	480i	OXYGEN	Oxygen
