= Bill Beutel =

American reporter and journalist (1930–2006)

- Beutel in 1977
- Born: William Charles Beutel; December 12, 1930; Cleveland, Ohio, U.S.
- Died: March 18, 2006 (aged 75); Pinehurst, North Carolina, U.S.
- Education: Dartmouth College (BA); University of Michigan Law School
- Occupations: Television reporter, correspondent and anchor

William Charles Beutel^{1} (December 12, 1930 – March 18, 2006) was an American television reporter, journalist, and anchor. He was best known for working over four decades with the American Broadcasting Company, spending much of that time anchoring Eyewitness News for WABC-TV in New York City. He also was an ABC radio network newscaster before ABC Radio split into four networks in January 1968. After the split he reported on the American Contemporary Network and occasionally substituted for Paul Harvey, while his Eyewitness News partner Roger Grimsby presented a daily afternoon radio newscast on the American Entertainment Network.

== Early life and career ==
After a stint in the Army, Beutel graduated from Dartmouth College and then studied law at the University of Michigan Law School, though he left without obtaining his degree. While Beutel was in law school, he wrote Edward R. Murrow a letter saying, "I very much wanted to be a radio journalist." Beutel received a letter back advising him to go to the Columbia University Graduate School of Journalism. His first broadcasting job was for WGAR in Cleveland, then joined WEWS-TV as a news editor and anchor in July 1959. Beutel moved to New York City in January 1960 as a newscaster for WCBS, the flagship for CBS Radio.

== Television career ==
Beutel moved to ABC in October 1962 as a reporter with ABC News and as an anchor at the network's New York flagship, WABC-TV. WABC-TV built on its three-year ratings success with newscast Report to New York anchored by Scott Vincent, and expanded the format to a one-hour 6:00 p.m. newscast called The Big News. That expansion was not without risk, and the new format struggled in the ratings. Among the hundreds of famous personages who were interviewed by Beutel was the African American Muslim and black nationalist leader Malcolm X.^{2} Beutel left his WABC duties for two years in April 1968 to join ABC News full-time as their London bureau chief.

In 1970, he got a call from Al Primo, who had taken over as news director at WABC after Beutel left. Primo had brought the Eyewitness News format, in which the reporters directly presented their stories, along with him from KYW-TV in Philadelphia. He wanted Beutel to return to New York as co-anchor alongside Roger Grimsby, whom Primo hired away from KGO-TV to serve as WABC-TV's main anchor. Primo remembered Beutel's solo anchor run in the early 1960s. Since Grimsby had already established a powerful presence after just two years in New York, Primo wanted a co-anchor "who could be his own man." Beutel assured Primo he could be.

Beutel rejoined WABC-TV in September 1970 as Grimsby's co-anchor on Eyewitness News. The two worked together for 16 years, most of which was spent going back and forth with WCBS-TV for first place in the New York ratings. In January 1975, Beutel was reassigned by ABC News and became the co-host, along with Stephanie Edwards, of a new morning show called AM America. This show, ABC's first attempt at a morning news program to compete with NBC's Today and CBS's combination of network news and Captain Kangaroo, lasted ten months on the air.

AM America was replaced on November 3, 1975 by Good Morning America, originally anchored by David Hartman and Nancy Dussault. Beutel returned to WABC-TV and Eyewitness News, though he maintained a presence on the network as the anchor of its 15-minute late newscasts on Saturday and Sunday nights through the late 1970s.

The reformed Grimsby-Beutel team kept Eyewitness News on top of the ratings through the middle 1980s, when it briefly fell to last place. Though the ratings drop was mostly associated with ABC-TV's poor primetime performance during that time, it led to Grimsby's firing in 1986. Within a year, WABC-TV had shot back to first place and has been the ratings leader in New York ever since. After Grimsby's firing, Beutel was joined at 6:00 p.m. by Kaity Tong and John Johnson in a rotating anchor arrangement and was permanently joined by Johnson beginning in 1988.

In 1990 Beutel began a long stint anchoring the 6 p.m. news alone, which ended when his 11 p.m. co-anchor Diana Williams joined him in 1999. He would close each broadcast with a brief commentary on the issues covered that day.

Beutel returned to the 11 p.m. Eyewitness News in 1989 after Ernie Anastos left to join WCBS and was originally paired with then-longtime co-anchor Kaity Tong. After Tong left WABC in 1991 Beutel anchored with Susan Roesgen for one year, but the pairing was unsuccessful and in 1992 Roesgen was replaced by Diana Williams.

Beutel left the 11:00 p.m. newscast in 1999 and was replaced by ABC News correspondent Bill Ritter. In 2001 Ritter also replaced Beutel as the 6 p.m. anchor, and Beutel spent the final two years of his career serving as a senior correspondent and occasional commentator; he would also continue to comment on the issues at the close of the 6 p.m. newscast, which became its own segment titled "Final Thought".

Beutel retired from television in February 2003, having served as an anchor at WABC-TV for a total of 37 years—giving him the longest run in New York television history, until he was surpassed by Rafael Pineda, who has been anchor at Spanish-language station WXTV since 1972. Beutel remained the longest-serving anchor at an English-language station in New York City until April 2011, when he was surpassed by WNBC's Chuck Scarborough. His trademark sign-off was "Good luck, be well".

== Personal life ==
Beutel was married four times. His first marriage was to Gail Wilder, which lasted twenty years and gave Beutel his four children, son Peter and daughters Robin, Colby, and Heather. In 1975, he married actress Lynn Deerfield (1950-2011), twenty years his junior, but the marriage was brief. In 1977, Beutel's third marriage, lasted four months. In 1980, Beutel married Adair Atwell, a former tobacco industry lobbyist.

== Death ==
Following his retirement, Beutel moved to North Carolina with his wife. A short while later, he was found to have a degenerative brain condition that was eventually diagnosed as Lewy body dementia. The condition progressed and he died on March 19, 2006, at the age of 75.

Beutel was survived by his wife Adair, as well as his former wives, and his four children from his first marriage. His son Peter, a businessman and energy sector analyst, died of a heart attack in March 2012.

== See also ==
- New Yorkers in journalism

== Notes ==
- ^1 Ritter, Bill (2006-03-19). "Remembering Bill Beutel". WABC-TV. Archived from the original on 21 March 2006. Note: When Beutel was hired at WABC-TV, the news director did not like the sound of his last name, /ˈbjuːtəl/. He asked him to change the pronunciation to /bjuːˈtɛl/.
- ^2 Haley, Alex (1965). The Autobiography of Malcolm X. New York: Grove. pp. 414–415. ISBN 0-345-37671-4.
