= Rose Ann Scamardella =

American television journalist

- Born: July 20, 1947 (age 79); New York City, U.S.
- Education: Marymount Manhattan College
- Occupation: Television journalist

Rose Ann Scamardella (born July 20, 1947) is a former anchorwoman of WABC-TV's Eyewitness News in New York City, and the inspiration for Gilda Radner's character "Roseanne Roseannadanna" on Saturday Night Live.

== Biography ==
Rose Ann Scamardella was born in Brooklyn, New York City, and graduated from Marymount Manhattan College with a B.A. in sociology in 1968.

After working for Gerald Freedman, a stockbroker, for "a couple of years" by her own account, she became the personnel director of an export company. By 1972, referred to in The Village Voice as "Roseann" Scamardella, she was working as what the paper identified only as a "television journalist".

Accounts of her hiring at WABC-TV Eyewitness News vary. Howard Weinberg, a producer then with the Educational Broadcasting Corporation, owner of WNET, recounts that he "responded to concerns for newsroom diversity and [the WABC] News Director's complaints that he couldn't find an Italian-American correspondent; [I] found Rose Ann, ... coached her, worked with her."

Scamardella said in 1975 that while she was employed at the export firm and working to get her master's degree in sociology at New York University, "I get this call that the Human Rights Commission is looking for an Italian-American girl. ... So they took me, sitting on discrimination cases. Then the news director here at ABC at the time, Al Primo, was looking for an Italian girl. ... Al talked to me for about five minutes and hired me. I went on the air two weeks later, scared stiff. I got no training at all. Correspondent Geraldo Rivera took me around on some stories a few nights, but that was it."

Scamardella began as a reporter and later became an anchor for the broadcast in 1978. She was mostly known as a co-anchor with Ernie Anastos on the weeknight 11 p.m. edition of Eyewitness News during the late 1970s and early 1980s. She remained in that position until leaving WABC-TV in 1983.

She returned to New York local television in May 1999 to present a two-part report on the plight of Albanian refugees in Brooklyn for WNYW-TV's Ten O' Clock News. She went on to teach at the Salisbury School in Salisbury, Connecticut, during the 1990s and into 2000.

After this, Scamardella co-hosted a television show, Crossroads Magazine. She was partnered with Father John Gatzak on the show, which was produced in cooperation with the Office of Radio and Television of the Archdiocese of Hartford; it aired on two Connecticut television stations, CW20 and MyTV9.
