= Sandra Bookman =

American journalist

- Born: 8 October 1959 (age 67); Beaumont, Texas, U.S.
- Occupations: journalist, television personality
- Notable credit(s): Reporter for ABC News and Reporter/Anchor for WABC-TV in New York City (1998 - present)

Sandra Bookman (born October 8, 1959 in Beaumont, Texas) is an American television news reporter and anchor. She is currently a reporter and anchor at WABC-TV in New York City. As of 2024, she co-anchors the noon weekday editions of Eyewitness News; she previously co-anchored the 5 p.m., 6 p.m. and 11 p.m. weekend editions of Eyewitness News.

She joined the station in 1998 from WSB-TV in Atlanta, Georgia where she worked as weekend anchor and reporter from 1989 to 1998. She was previously weekend anchor at both Raleigh, North Carolina's WRAL-TV and in Beaumont, Texas' KFDM.

She has won three Emmy Awards for her reporting including Olympic Coverage and the aftermath of Valuejet Airlines Crash in the Everglades.

Bookman was an Olympic Reporter for ABC News for seven years and was the only Atlanta based reporter to cover the games from Atlanta before the bid and until the Olympic bombing in 1996. She also covered the 1992 Olympic games in Barcelona, Spain.

Bookman reported on the events of 9-11 for WABC.

She graduated from University of Texas with a B.A. in journalism and currently lives in Manhattan.

In 2019, Bookman hosted a fundraiser for the 40th anniversary of the Boys and Girls Club of Harlem.

In 2024, Bookman was honored by the Native American organization Drums Along the Mohawk, for her "multicultural" work.

== See also ==
- New Yorkers in journalism
