= Al Primo =

American television executive (1935–2022)

- Born: Albert Thomas Primo; July 3, 1935; Pittsburgh, Pennsylvania, U.S.
- Died: September 29, 2022 (aged 87); Old Greenwich, Connecticut, U.S.
- Education: University of Pittsburgh (BA)
- Occupation: Television executive
- Known for: Eyewitness News
- Spouse: Rosina Pregano (died 2018)
- Children: 3

Albert Thomas Primo (July 3, 1935 – September 29, 2022) was an American television news executive who was credited with creating the Eyewitness News format. More than a hundred markets have taken the Eyewitness News name to label their own featured local newscasts and others are using Primo's concept under different names for their own formats. "Eyewitness News was the first newscast to put [news] reporters on the set", Primo states in his autobiographical book, Eyewitness Newsman. The New York Daily News described Primo as the man "who almost single-handedly changed the face of broadcast journalism." Station newscasts were only 15 minutes long and he supervised the transition to thirty minute programs.

== Early life and education ==
Primo was born in Pittsburgh, on July 3, 1935. His father immigrated to the United States from Italy. He was raised in nearby Perrysville, Pennsylvania, and attended North Catholic Boys School and Perry High School. He studied at the University of Pittsburgh, graduating with a Bachelor of Arts in 1958. He then commenced postgraduate studies at Carnegie Mellon University in 1959, but left the following year without completing a degree there.

== Career ==
Primo began in the business in 1953 as a mail boy at WDTV in Pittsburgh, Pennsylvania, moving up the ranks as the station switched dial positions (from channel 3 to channel 2), owners (from the DuMont Television Network to Westinghouse Broadcasting) and call letters (to KDKA-TV), working as news writer, cameraman, reporter, and anchorman. In February 1963, Primo was named assistant news director of KDKA-TV.

Primo moved from KDKA-TV to KYW-TV in Cleveland, Ohio, to become the news director there in 1964. While in Cleveland, Primo hired Tom Snyder when the previous anchor, Jim Axel, left. When Westinghouse switched their Cleveland station for NBC's WRCV in Philadelphia in 1965, Primo moved to Philadelphia.

=== Eyewitness News ===
It was in Philadelphia that Primo launched the Eyewitness News format (the name itself had been used for some years before that by Westinghouse's television stations for its local newscasts, and in fact was first used by KYW itself in 1959 when it was based in Cleveland, Ohio).

In September 1968, Primo moved to WABC-TV, the ABC affiliate in New York City, to become director of news there. He refined the Eyewitness News format at WABC, hiring minority and women reporters whom he placed in prominent positions in the newscast (including the addition of "on-camera exchanges between anchors and on-set reporters, which Chicago-based media critic Morry Roth dubbed "happy talk" when the format was introduced on WLS-TV's newscast), and the Eyewitness News name and format radiated across the United States from here. Primo also chose the musical score from the Tar Sequence in the movie Cool Hand Luke (composed by Lalo Schifrin) as the news theme to WABC's Eyewitness News. It consequently exposed many other television stations in the United States (and by extension, their viewers) to Schifrin's work. At WABC-TV, Primo assembled the anchor duo of Roger Grimsby and Bill Beutel in 1970. The duo garnered high ratings for 16 years until April 1986, when Grimsby was let go from the station.

=== ABC News ===
Primo was made vice president in charge of news for ABC's owned and operated stations in May 1972. In February 1973, ABC launched a half-hour newsmagazine, The Reasoner Report, featuring veteran newsman Harry Reasoner as anchor. When executive producer Ernest Leiser left The Reasoner Report to become executive producer of ABC Evening News (which Reasoner also anchored), Primo was brought in to replace him. The Reasoner Report was cancelled in May 1975, and Primo left the network the following year to become a consultant.

== Later years ==
In 1999, Primo worked with Jonathan Braun to launch foreigntv.com, a web site which featured streaming broadcasts from international news, hiring Peter Arnett as an international correspondent. The following year, foreigntv.com, Inc. became Medium4.com, launching three additional web sites: StreamingUSA.com, NicheTV.com and Medium4Music.com. Primo went on to launch Teen Kids News in 2002 as a project to give young people an opportunity to develop an interest in the news industry through delivering news and information to their peers.

== Personal life ==
Primo was married to Rosina Pregano for 55 years until her death in March 2018. Together, they had three children. One of them, Albert, predeceased him.

Primo died on September 29, 2022, at his home in Old Greenwich, Connecticut. He was 87 and suffered from lung cancer prior to his death.
