= Bill Ritter (journalist) =

American journalist and news anchor at WABC-TV

- Born: February 26, 1950 (age 76); Los Angeles, California, U.S.
- Occupations: Journalist – Evening Anchor for WABC-TV & Correspondent for 20/20
- Years active: 1987–2026
- Notable credit: 7 Emmy Awards
- Spouses: Janny Scott (divorced) Kathleen Friery (m. 2008)
- Children: 3

William Sheldon Ritter (born February 26, 1950) is an American retired television news anchor and journalist. He was with WABC-TV in New York City from 1998 to 2026, initially anchoring on weekends before succeeding Bill Beutel on the 11 p.m. news in September 1999, then at 6 p.m. in February 2001. He is also a correspondent for the ABC News program 20/20.

For Eyewitness News, Ritter traveled to Israel the week before the start of the war in Iraq, to find out how Israelis and Palestinians were preparing for a possible military conflict 500 miles from their land.

Ritter has investigated drug use among some teenage Orthodox Jews in Brooklyn, and looked into problems with the dramatic increase in the number of construction scaffolds in New York. Ritter also covers fire safety and prevention for Eyewitness News, and hosts the annual "Operation 7 Save A Life" a special and campaign. Ritter has climbed the Empire State Building, tagging along with the man who repairs and replaces the broadcast antennas on top of one of New York's tallest skyscrapers. And, for the first time on live television, Ritter was tested for prostate cancer. As part of the test, Ritter also interviewed New York's most famous prostate cancer patient: former Mayor Rudy Giuliani.

Ritter used to write a daily column, Behind the News with Bill Ritter, which previewed the 11 pm edition of Eyewitness News. It was sent via e-mail, and regularly offered insights into how it gathers the news.

== Career in Southern California ==
=== San Diego ===
From February 1987 to January 1990, Ritter was an investigative reporter for NBC's San Diego affiliate KCST-TV (which became KNSD in 1988). He was known for his white-collar crime investigations as well as his reports exposing a safety scandal involving killer whales and their trainers at SeaWorld San Diego. Ritter earned four Emmy Awards and in 1989 he was honored for his investigative reporting in uncovering a local stock swindle, as well as for his "overall journalistic enterprise." He was also named NBC Affiliate Reporter of the Year in 1987 and 1988.

=== Los Angeles ===
In February 1990, Ritter became an investigative reporter for Fox owned-and-operated station KTTV-TV in Los Angeles. He also was an anchor for KTTV's Gulf War coverage and had also reported on the Rodney King trial and the subsequent Los Angeles riots for the Fox Television Network. From August 1991 through February 1992, Ritter also served as a reporter for the Fox Network's nationally syndicated show Entertainment Daily Journal (E.D.J.).

Ritter moved to independent station KCAL-TV (then-owned by the The Walt Disney Company) in June 1992. His "Up Front" segment headlined the weekday editions of KCAL's Prime 9 News at 9 p.m. weeknight news broadcast and featured his perspective of the day's top national or international story. Ritter departed from KCAL in December 1992.

== ABC News ==
=== Good Morning America Sunday ===
Ritter joined ABC News in January 1993 as co-anchor of Good Morning America Sunday. At ABC News, he covered dozens of important news stories for Good Morning America, including the crash of TWA Flight 800, the death of Princess Diana, the criminal and civil trials of O. J. Simpson, the aftermath of the Oklahoma City bombing and the Midwest floods of 1997.

Ritter's feature reporting for GMA includes revealing interviews with boxers Mike Tyson and Evander Holyfield, golfers Jack Nicklaus and Arnold Palmer, former evangelist Jim Bakker and Peanuts cartoonist Charles Schulz. He also contributed to GMAs series, which included in-depth looks at drugs and teenagers, the alarming increase in "budget" plastic surgeries and the emotional consequences of so-called "blended" or step families.

=== 20/20 ===
For 20/20, Ritter reported stories that ran the gamut from light-hearted to heart-warming to deadly serious. He investigated the claims of James Van Praagh, the supposed psychic who says he can talk to the dead; he covered the Columbine shootings; he investigated the phenomenon of patients waking up during surgery; he reported on "slip and fall" scams at casinos across the nation; he reported on a New York man who died while donating his kidney to his wife, whose family says the doctor left the operating room before the surgery was completed; he examined the effects of parental anger on kids by having cameras in several homes for several weeks; he debunked the so-called urban legends that sprung up in the wake of September 11; and he followed a group of female Army recruits as they went through a grueling nine weeks of basic training.

On the lighter side, he paraglided off an 11,000-foot mountain in Aspen, Colorado, scaled a rock face in Jasper, Alberta, "posed" as a bull-clown at a rodeo in Texas and was the first non-Barnum and Bailey employee to perform on a trapeze for that circus.

=== WABC-TV ===
In September 1999, Ritter was named to co-anchor WABC-TV New York's Eyewitness News' 11 p.m. broadcast with Diana Williams and seventeen months later in February 2001 was added to co-anchor the 6 p.m. edition of the newscast as well. In 2003, upon Williams’ move to the 5 p.m. broadcasts, Ritter was joined at 6 and 11 p.m. by Liz Cho. In 2011, 5 p.m. anchor Sade Baderinwa replaced Cho at 11 p.m. alongside Ritter. On September 13, 2019, Ritter was named the new co-anchor of the 5 p.m. edition alongside Baderinwa, replacing Diana Williams who had retired from the station after 29 years.

On March 6, 2025, Ritter stepped down from anchoring the 11 p.m. news, with Mike Marza replacing him in that capacity. On June 2, 2025, Ritter moved from the 5 p.m. broadcast to the 6 p.m. broadcast with Liz Cho. Ritter would continue to host ‘’Up Close’’ on Sundays.

On Friday June 12, 2026, Ritter stated on the 6 p.m. news broadcast that he would be stepping down as a news anchor permanently because he has received a diagnosis of Alzheimer's disease. He also stated that it would be his last and final news broadcast as a news anchor.

== Personal life ==
Ritter was born to a Jewish family. In 1972, he was expelled from San Diego State University for protesting the Vietnam War; at the time he was one semester short of graduating. At his daughter's suggestion 40 years later, he decided to complete his college education, receiving a degree from The New School on May 20, 2016.

Ritter was married to Janny Scott, an award-winning journalist and biographer. They met in San Diego, were together 19 years and had two children. He is currently married to Kathleen Friery; they have one child.

Ritter stepped down from his role as a news anchor on June 12, 2026, following a diagnosis of Alzheimer's disease.

== See also ==
- New Yorkers in journalism
