= Tom Dunn (journalist) =

American journalist (1929–2006)

Tom Dunn (May 1, 1929 – July 2, 2006) was an anchor and reporter at several New York and Florida television stations.

Dunn was born in Warwick, New York, but his first job was in West Palm Beach, Florida, at radio station WWPG. He started in television at WCTV in Tallahassee in 1959 after leaving the Army and attended Florida State University in Tallahassee. He served as press secretary to U.S. representative Edward Gurney, then worked as an anchor and reporter for WTVT in Tampa from 1962 to 1964 before moving to WCBS-TV where he worked from 1964 to 1968. Dunn served in that same role for WABC-TV from 1969 to 1970 and at WOR-TV from 1971 to 1987. Among his duties at WOR was anchoring the long-running News at Noon. He later worked for WPTV in West Palm Beach, first as a fill-in but later as the weekend evening and late night anchor. He was moved to weekend mornings in early 1998. When the station changed to a single anchor that May, he retired.

Dunn died of esophageal cancer in Stuart, Florida, on July 2, 2006.

His wife, Anna Dunn, reported that Richard Nixon asked Dunn to be his press secretary, but he refused the position because he feared he might not be able to get back into television news if he took the job. Dunn was an avid sailor, skier, cooking enthusiast, and voracious reader. Dunn also appeared in several motion pictures, including Turk 182 and Without A Trace.
