= Scott Vincent =

American actor

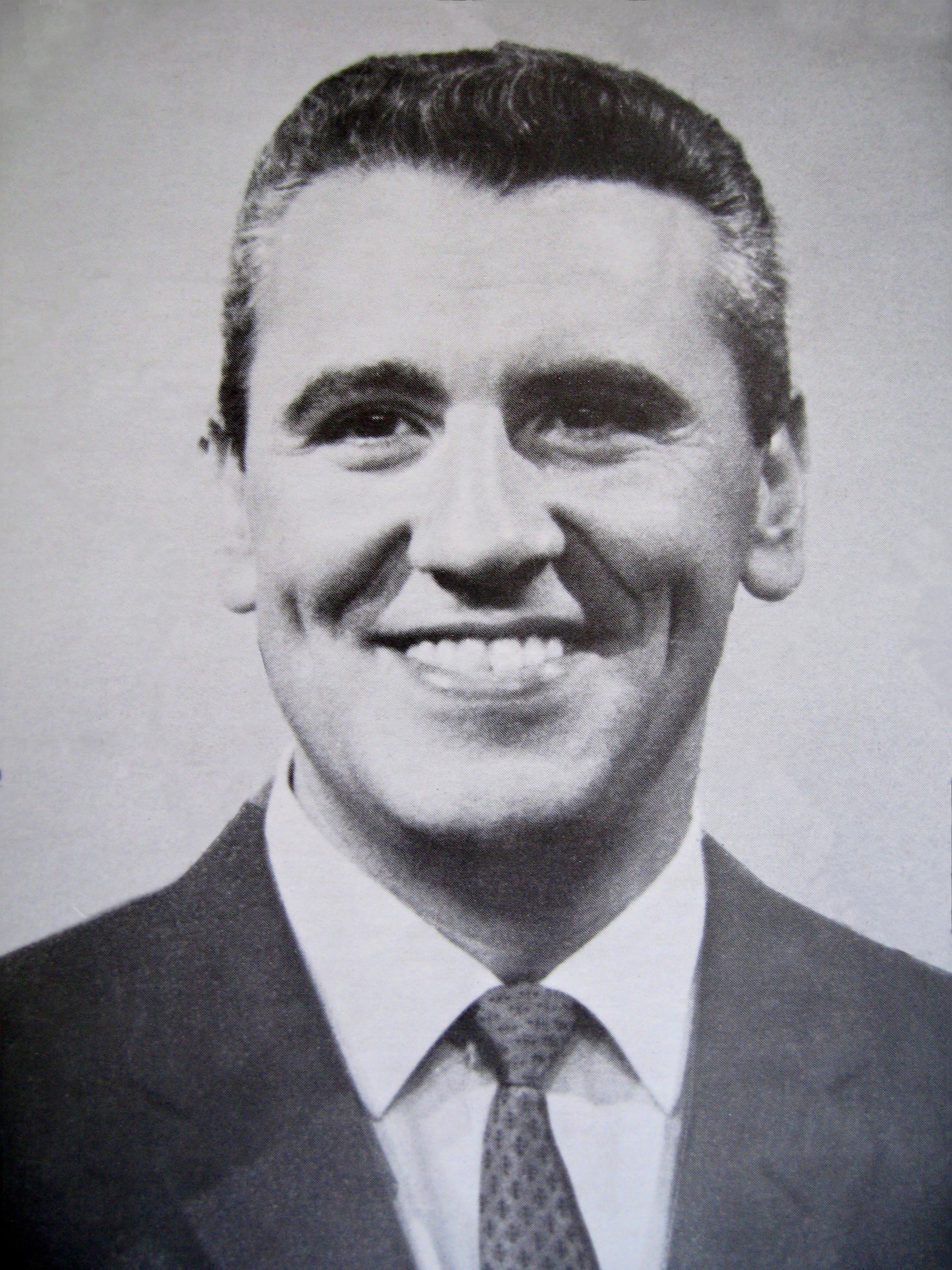
- Scott Vincent in 1961
- Born: Arnold Vincent Cigliano; December 24, 1922; Rye, New York, U.S.
- Died: May 31, 1979 (aged 56); Bronxville, New York, U.S.
- Occupations: Staff announcer, newscaster, voice actor.

Scott Vincent (December 24, 1922 – May 31, 1979) was an American radio and television announcer and newscaster.

== Radio ==
Scott Vincent was a staff announcer for nearly 25 years at ABC's flagship owned-and-operated station WABC-TV in New York. His first assignments were for WABC Radio in 1955, including "The Scott Vincent Show," "Scott's Tour," Scott Vincent News." From October 1955 through April 1956, Scott Vincent was narrator/host for "New Sounds for You," a new-concept broadcast designed to compete with NBC's "Monitor." Local papers reported: "Because the United States Information Agency required a new series combining entertainment, quality of production and a comprehensive format, it requested permission from ABC to transmit "New Sounds For You" regularly on a worldwide scale." The USIA also beamed "New Sounds" behind the Iron Curtain. The premiere broadcast of "New Sounds for You" was named "Outstanding Broadcast" by Radio-Television Daily in 1955. Scott also hosted another ABC Radio program in 1956, "America's Town Meeting of the Air." "Town Meeting" tackled issues of the day such as: "Is the government controlled by Big Business?" Vincent moderated that particular debate with two members of key Congressional committees. In 1957, Vincent was show announcer for "The Merv Griffin Show," broadcast live from the Elysee Theater in New York as part of the "Live and Lively" campaign for the, then, newly formed American Broadcasting Network. Scott Vincent's radio credits from 1958 include "The Constance Bennett Show". In 1961, he hosted "Pilgrimage: The American Scene," an ecumenical series sponsored by the National Council of Churches on ABC Radio, designed to showcase American heritage in songs and music, past and present.

== Television ==
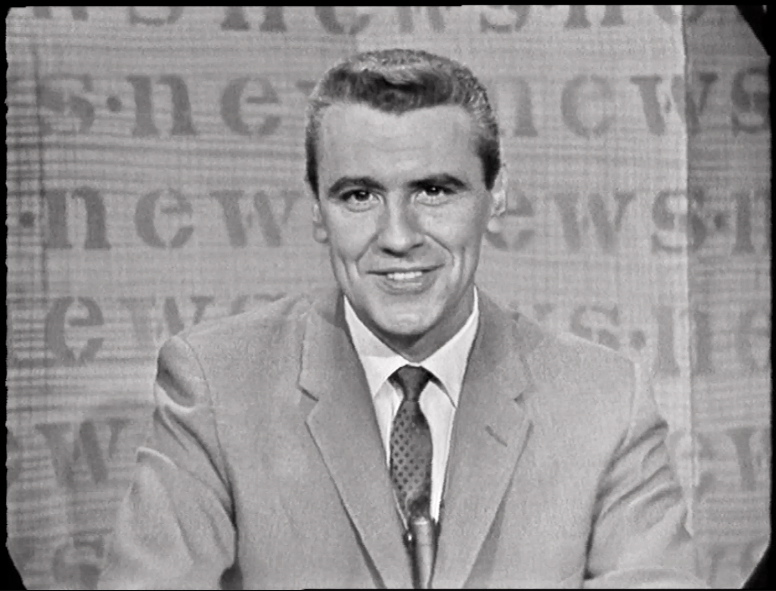
Scott Vincent

=== Off-camera: Shock ===
While continuing to do programs and news for ABC Radio, local and network, Scott Vincent pursued work in television. In 1957, he was one of the four off-screen announcers for WABC-TV's "The Night Show" and it's "Shock Theater" package of 52 horror movies. Scott hosted the program in regular rotation with his three colleagues through John Zacherle's arrival on September 22, 1958. He was also the on-camera host for "Family Film Festival."

==== On-Camera: WABC-TV's first newscaster ====
On October 26, 1959, Joseph Stamler, vice president and general manager of WABC-TV, launched the station's news department with "Report to New York," WABC-TV's first regular late evening news program, featuring Scott Vincent with news, and Lynn Dollar with weather ("Weather Time"). "Report to New York" aired Monday through Friday at 11 pm.

As part of its youth project, WABC-TV News presented its first one-hour special documentary, "Youth: A Summer Crisis,?" featuring Scott Vincent as host and narrator. The program aired live on July 20, 1960, with combined reporting and interviews, and was designed to "uplift the values, raise the standards and stimulate the ambitions" of New York City's young people. "The New York Times" responded positively:

"The perplexing and ominous problems caused by the lack of summer jobs for New York City's youngsters were eloquently outlined last night on WABC-TV...In televising the show live and with film, the station more than satisfactorily combined the techniques of both feature reporting and interviews....It was a timely program that made a worthwhile contribution to the community,."

"Variety" praised as well:

"On the whole, this searching analysis was a creditable public service documentary of which WABC-TV may well be proud. Host-narrator Scott Vincent adeptly handled his chores while Walter Wager's crisp script and (Lou) Volpicelli's direction were additional aspects."

New York City Mayor Robert F. Wagner, who was a guest on the program, later applauded the series during hearings before the US Congress on juvenile delinquency:

"I would especially like to commend WABC-TV for...its fine hour long documentary "Youth: A Summer Crisis?" which set forth these problems in a dramatic and compelling fashion."

On August 17, 1960 Joseph Stamler, Bill Shadel, ABC-TV commentator, and Scott Vincent, WABC-TV's newsman held a coaching seminar for approximately 100 New York area politicos including candidates, campaign managers and organization workers, covering topics such as material preparation, speech delivery, camera and microphone technique, dress and makeup.

By January 1961, according to WABC-TV ad sales, "Scott Vincent and Report to New York earned the highest rating ever for a Channel 7 news program," with ratings up 50% since its debut. (Nielsen and Arbitron, Jan-Feb '61 vs. Jan-Feb '60)" WABC-TV's success with late evening news reporting, election coverage, and documentary and special reports, prompted them to expand "Report to New York" to Monday-Friday, 6:15–6:30 pm following ABC Network News 6:00–6:15 pm, featuring "News with Scott Vincent," "Sports Results with Howard Cosell," and Penny Wright (Regina Dombeck) with weather.[23] "Report to New York" averaged a rating of 4.5 per telecast, while its lead-in, ABC Network News, averaged about a 3.0 rating. WABC-TV also created its first regular weekend news programs with "Saturday Evening Final" and "Sunday Evening Final," both anchored by Scott Vincent at 11 pm to provide a "complete, comprehensive weekend summary of late breaking headlines, sports results and weather reports." "Saturday Evening Final" and "Sunday Evening Final" aired from April 2, 1961, through January 27, 1963, opposite Walter Cronkite on WCBS and Frank Blair on WNBC.

In addition to regular news reporting and documentaries, Scott Vincent anchored WABC-TV's live election coverage with Bill Shadel on November 1, 1961. He also hosted other news and public service programs on-camera during this period at WABC-TV, including the Emmy nominated series, "Expedition: New York," 1960–62, series for informing and entertaining children.

Scott Vincent continued his weekday anchoring duties at the station through October 19, 1962, and continued reporting news on-camera in various time periods through the fall of 1966. His successful contributions as WABC-TV's first newscaster put WABC-TV's news department on the map, and made it possible for the station to further expand its news operation.

=== Off-camera: ABC & NBC Television Networks ===
Scott Vincent's other credits as staff announcer for the ABC television network during this period include "Music For A Spring Night", "Music For A Summer Night" which aired from 1959–60. The series ended with two Christmas specials: "Music For a Christmas Night: The Sounds of Christmas" (Dec 18, 1960) and "Music For a Christmas Night: The Gift of Song" (Dec 25, 1960).

On April 27, 1962, Scott was heard on rival network NBC-TV as the off-camera host and narrator of "Till Autumn," the Season 4, Episode 14 broadcast of "The Bell Telephone Hour".

Scott Vincent was also show announcer for "The Jimmy Dean Show" on ABC, which aired for three seasons from September 19, 1963, to April 1, 1966, from New York. He also announced "Directions" for ABC TV in 1965, and anchored ABC network news reports on camera during the mid-sixties.

Scott Vincent's news reporting on 77 WABC during the Cousin Brucie Show expanded to announcing for Bruce Morrow's television specials and series on WABC-TV, beginning with "Go-Go," hosted by Bruce Morrow and Scott Muni in 1965. Bruce Morrow's acclaimed special, "A Mod Mod World," followed in 1966, and lead to a Martin Morris directed TV series, "The Bruce Morrow Shown," (1967). Additional specials followed including "Music Power," (11/08/1967) and a Bruce Morrow special executive produced by David B. Fein and taped on location at the Nevele resort (1968).

In 1968, WABC-TV tapped Scott Vincent's ability to generate excitement and sustain viewership across a 2 1/2-hour span by assigning him to two shows, back to back. The first was "The Big Show," later rechristened "The 4:30 Movie," a 90-minute lead into Al Primo's groundbreaking "Eyewitness News" at 6 and 11 pm. Scott voiced these programs with an exciting, engaging style that kept viewers tuned into WABC from 4:30 to 7 pm, and the ABC network news and entertainment programming which followed.

Sometimes Scott's unique announcing style eclipsed the on-air talent that WABC hired for the program. When, for example, during the mid-1970s, WABC recruited Tom Ellis and Bill Bonds from other stations to co-anchor with Roger Grimsby, Newsday critic Marvin Kitman wrote:

"Neither Bonds nor Ellis is as exciting as the announcer who tells us of things "STILL TO COME: Tex with the Weather...Anna with the Hustle..." That voice should become an anchorman one day."

Scott Vincent announced The 4:30 Movie and "Eyewitness News" off camera, and he voiced promos for these programs that ran on WABC day and night for ten years. The indelible signature style Scott Vincent created for Eyewitness News was eventually distributed on tape by management to all of ABC's owned-and-operated stations as the model for Eyewitness News show opens across the country. His voice so saturated and dominated the airwaves of that station during the 1970s that he became known as "The Voice of WABC." Scott Vincent was a graduate of Lafayette College in Easton, Pennsylvania, where he earned a Bachelor of Arts degree in 1944. In 1946, he earned a Bachelor of Divinity degree from Princeton University. Scott Vincent died on May 31, 1979, in Bronxville, New York, at age 56 of lung cancer.
