= WABC-TV =

Television station in New York City

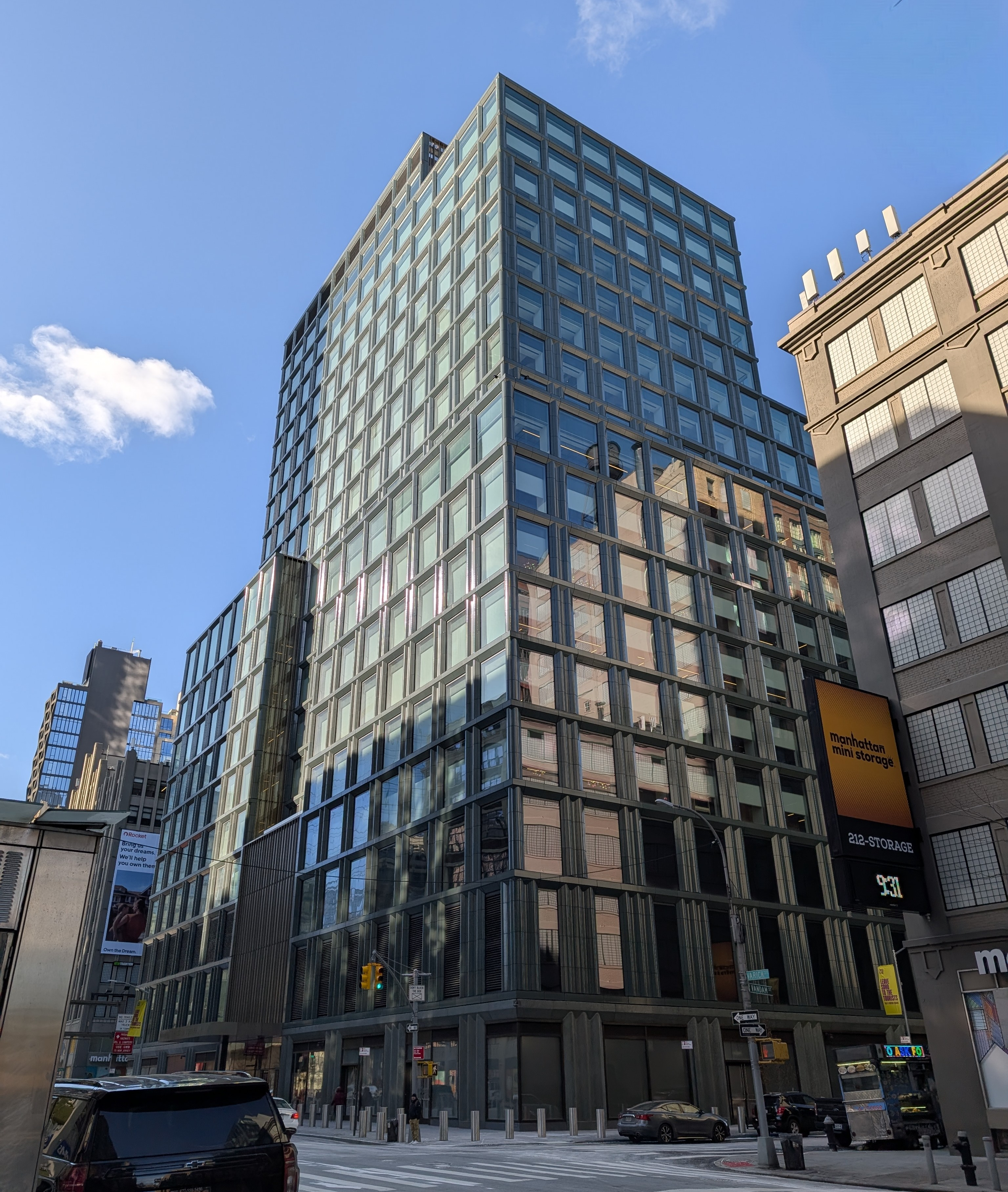
- 7 Hudson Square, the studio facility for WABC-TV
- New York, New York; United States
- Channels: Digital: 7 (VHF); Virtual: 7
- Branding: ABC 7 or Channel 7; Channel 7 Eyewitness News

Programming
- Affiliations: 7.1: ABC; for others, see § Subchannels

Ownership
- Owner: ABC Owned Television Stations; (WABC Television (New York), LLC)

History
- Founded: May 8, 1947
- First air date: August 10, 1948
- Former call signs: WJZ-TV (1948–1953)
- Former channel numbers: Analog: 7 (VHF, 1948–2009); Digital: 45 (UHF, 2001–2009); Translator: W66AA Bronx
- Call sign meaning: American Broadcasting Company

Technical information
- Licensing authority: FCC
- Facility ID: 1328
- ERP: 34 kW
- HAAT: 405 m (1,329 ft)
- Transmitter coordinates: 40°44′54″N 73°59′9″W

Links
- Public license information: Public file; LMS
- Website: abc7ny.com

WABC-TV (channel 7) is a television station in New York City. It is the flagship station of the ABC television network, owned and operated through its ABC Owned Television Stations division. WABC-TV maintains studio facilities at 7 Hudson Square in Lower Manhattan, co-located with ABC's corporate headquarters. The station transmits from atop the Empire State Building.

WABC-TV is best known in broadcasting circles for its version of the Eyewitness News format and for its morning show, syndicated nationally by corporate cousin Disney Entertainment.

== History ==
=== As WJZ-TV (1948–1953) ===
The station signed on August 10, 1948, as WJZ-TV, the first of three television stations signed on by ABC during that same year, with WENR-TV in Chicago and WXYZ-TV in Detroit being the other two. Channel 7's call letters came from its then-sister radio station, WJZ. In its early years, WJZ-TV was programmed much like an independent station, as the ABC television network was still, for the most part, in its very early stages of development; the ABC-owned stations did air some common programming during this period, especially after the 1949 fall season when the network's prime time schedule began to expand. The station's original transmitter site was located at The Pierre Hotel at 2 East 61st Street, before moving to the Empire State Building in 1950. The station's original studios were located at 77 West 66th Street, with additional studios at 7 West 66th Street. A tunnel linked ABC studios at 7 West 66th Street to the lobby of the Hotel des Artistes, a block north on West 67th Street. Another studio inside the Hotel des Artistes was used for Eyewitness News Conference.

=== As WABC-TV (1953–present) ===
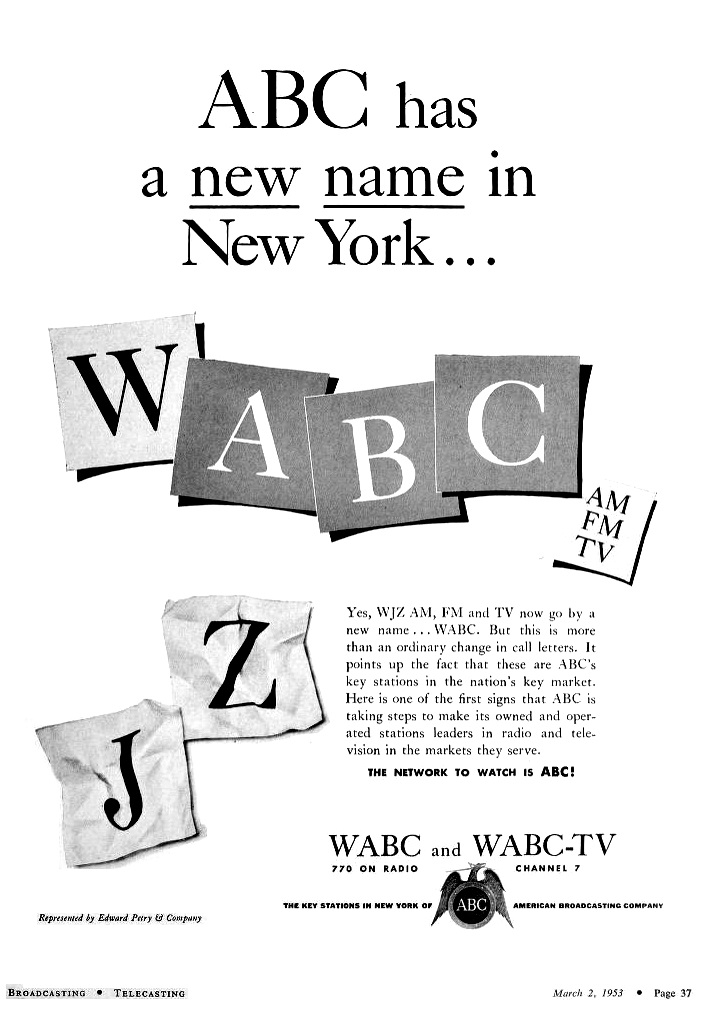
A March 1953 advertisement announcing the call letter change from WJZ-TV to WABC-TV

The station's call letters were changed to WABC-TV on March 1, 1953, after ABC merged its operations with United Paramount Theatres, a firm which was broken off from former parent company Paramount Pictures by decree of the U.S. government. The WJZ-TV callsign was later reassigned to Westinghouse Broadcasting (the original owners of WJZ radio in New York) as an historical nod in 1957 for their newly acquired television station in Baltimore—a station that was, by coincidence, an ABC affiliate until 1995.

As part of ABC's expansion program, initiated in 1977, ABC built 7 Lincoln Square on the southeast corner of West 67th Street and Columbus Avenue, on the site of an abandoned moving and storage warehouse. At about the same time, construction was started at 30 West 67th Street on the site of a former parking lot. Both buildings were completed in June 1979 and WABC-TV moved its offices from 77 West 66th Street to 7 Lincoln Square.

On September 11, 2001, the transmitter facilities of WABC-TV, as well as eight other local television stations and several radio stations, were destroyed when two hijacked airplanes crashed into and destroyed the north and south towers of the World Trade Center. WABC-TV's transmitter maintenance engineer Donald DiFranco died in the attack. In the immediate aftermath, the station fed its signal to WNYE-TV, WHSE-TV, WHSI-TV, and the New Jersey Network before establishing temporary facilities at the Armstrong Tower in Alpine, New Jersey. The station eventually re-established transmission facilities at the Empire State Building, its home from 1950 to 1980.

ABC News Now was launched in 2004 on digital subchannels of the ABC O&O stations. On January 31, 2005, ABC removed ABC News Now from O&O and affiliated stations' subchannels as the channel ended its experimental phase. The group changed its programming on secondary channels to ABC Plus, a local news and public affairs format. ABC teamed up with AccuWeather to launch a multicast service on WABC's third subchannel between December 9, 2005, and March 31, 2006.

On May 27, 2007, WABC-TV's studios suffered major damage as the result of a fire that knocked the station off the air shortly before the start of the 11 p.m. newscast. According to preliminary reports, the fire may have been ignited by a spotlight coming into contact with a curtain inside the news studio; the station's website later reported the cause as an "electrical malfunction". The station's building was evacuated and the fire was brought under control, though the studio was said to be "badly damaged", having suffered smoke and water damage. WABC-TV resumed broadcasting at around 1 a.m. on May 28, 2007 (initially carrying the network's 10 pm. West Coast feed of Brothers & Sisters, followed by the full broadcast of World News Now). Due to the fire, the station broadcast Eyewitness News from the newsroom, while Live! with Regis and Kelly, whose set was also affected, moved to the set of Who Wants to Be a Millionaire. Starting with the 5 p.m. newscast on June 20, 2007, the station resumed the Eyewitness News and Live! broadcasts from its main studios at Columbus Avenue and 66th Street.

The Live Well Network (LWN) was launched on April 27, 2009, in high definition by ABC's O&O stations on the stations' .2 subchannels.

WABC-TV discontinued regular programming on its analog signal, VHF channel 7, at 12:30 p.m. on June 12, 2009, as part of the federally mandated transition from analog to digital television. The station's digital signal relocated from its pre-transition UHF channel 45 to VHF channel 7. WABC's digital signal was initially difficult to receive over-the-air in New York City. The station was requested by the Federal Communications Commission (FCC) to broadcast at a lower power; WABC was among many stations which have found it necessary to increase power to restore coverage to the same level as its former analog signal. On June 29, 2009, WABC filed an application with the FCC to increase power from 11.69 kW to 27 kW. On January 31, 2010, the FCC granted a special temporary authority (STA) for the station to increase power to 26.9 kW.

In May 2013, WABC-TV and Philadelphia sister station WPVI-TV became the first two ABC-owned stations to offer live, web-based streaming of programming to authenticated subscribers of participating cable and satellite television providers as provided through the relaunched Watch ABC mobile apps.

ABCOTS indicated in January 2015 that its stations' third subchannel would affiliate with Laff network upon launch on April 15, 2015; until then, LWN would run on both subchannels. ABC Stations rebranded Live Well Network on .2 as Localish on February 17, 2020, to add an outlet for the Localish lifestyle content.

== Programming ==
WABC has long presented events such as the Columbus Day Parade and Puerto Rican Day Parade and beginning in 2017, they became the first television station to air the New York City LGBT Pride March. In addition, the station is also producing local programs such as Here and Now, a program covering the latest issues, trends and news stories impacting the local black community, Tiempo, a weekly program that focus on the issues affecting local Hispanic citizens, and Up Close, a public affairs program on the latest issues with the newsmakers. The station also formerly produced Viewpoint, a weekly program that highlighted the cultural and community efforts in New York, Long Island and New Jersey (each of these regions rotated weekly).

As of 2023, aside from Live with Kelly and Mark, WABC's first-run syndicated programs include Tamron Hall, Jeopardy!, and Wheel of Fortune.

=== Live with Kelly and Mark ===
WABC-TV produces the nationally syndicated talk show Live with Kelly and Mark. Until the station's newscasts were moved to a separate studio in 2011, the program originated in the same ground-floor studio at 7 Lincoln Square as Eyewitness News, thus creating a situation which forced local news updates broadcast during Good Morning America and Live to be produced from the WABC-TV newsroom and the morning show's presence also limited the size of the Eyewitness News set.

The program's roots originated with A.M. New York, which debuted in 1970 as a local version of NBC's Today show; its first host was John Bartholomew Tucker, who remained with the program until 1972. After Tucker's departure, a succession of hosts came and went, the most successful of whom was Stanley Siegel, who hosted from 1975 to 1978 (for a year beginning in 1977, the series was called The Stanley Siegel Show). After 1980, the show was retitled Good Morning New York, whose co-hosts in the last years of its run in that form included Spencer Christian, Andrea Kirby, Judy Licht, Dick Wolfsie and longtime Eyewitness News reporter and anchor Doug Johnson. After years of a losing ratings battle against Donahue on WNBC-TV, WABC-TV canceled Good Morning New York in early 1983.

The current show began as the station's second attempt at a local morning show a month later, aptly titled The Morning Show (using the "Circle 7" logo in the actual text for one of the "o"s) and was originally hosted by Regis Philbin and Cyndy Garvey. After Garvey's departure a year later, she was replaced by Ann Abernathy, who in turn, left in 1985 to return to Los Angeles. That year, Kathie Lee Johnson (who would marry Frank Gifford a year later) became Philbin's new co-host.

In 1988, Buena Vista Television began syndicating the show nationally as Live with Regis and Kathie Lee. Gifford left the show in 2000 and was eventually replaced by Kelly Ripa. Philbin left the show in November 2011 and the show aired for nearly a year as Live! with Kelly until former New York Giants defensive end Michael Strahan became Ripa's permanent co-host in September 2012. In May 2016, Strahan left the show to become a full-time anchor at Good Morning America, thus leaving Ripa as the solo host again. On May 1, 2017, it was announced that Ryan Seacrest would become the new host of the show; to accommodate his syndicated radio show On Air with Ryan Seacrest (which normally originates from Los Angeles), an additional studio was built within WABC's facilities. Seacrest departed Live on April 14, 2023, and three days later Ripa's husband, Mark Consuelos, became the new co-host of the show.

=== Sports programming ===
WABC-TV serves as the local over-the-air broadcaster of Monday Night Football games, airing simulcasts of the ESPN-televised games carried nationally on ABC. However, ESPN-only MNF telecasts involving the Giants or Jets air locally on WPIX. Previously, the station carried coverage of the Giants' victory in Super Bowl XXV.

Since 2013, WABC-TV serves as the exclusive local English-language carrier of the annual New York City Marathon. The station preempts a weekend edition of Good Morning America and delays This Week to schedule time for the live broadcast. The marathon is also simulcast on ESPN2 nationally (although viewers in the Tri-State area cannot see it via ESPN2 because the simulcast is blacked out locally).

WABC-TV currently airs any New York Knicks and Brooklyn Nets games televised via the NBA on ABC. The station has aired the Knicks' appearances in the 1970, 1972, 1973 and 2026 NBA Finals (where the Knicks won in 1970, 1973 and 2026), as well as the then-New Jersey Nets' appearance in the 2003 NBA Finals.

WABC-TV aired New York Rangers, New York Islanders and New Jersey Devils games carried through the NHL on ABC; this included the Devils' victories in the 2000 and 2003 Stanley Cup Final series, as well as their appearance in the 2001 Stanley Cup Final. Beginning in 2021, it officially reassumed this duty, this time as the OTA simulcast partner of the NHL on ESPN.

Through the ABC portion of the MLS on ESPN package, WABC-TV aired New York City FC's victory in the 2021 MLS Cup and the New York Red Bulls' appearance in the 2008 MLS Cup.

WABC-TV also previously aired any New York Yankees and New York Mets games through ABC's baseball contract; this included the Yankees' victory in the 1977 World Series and appearance in the 1981 World Series.

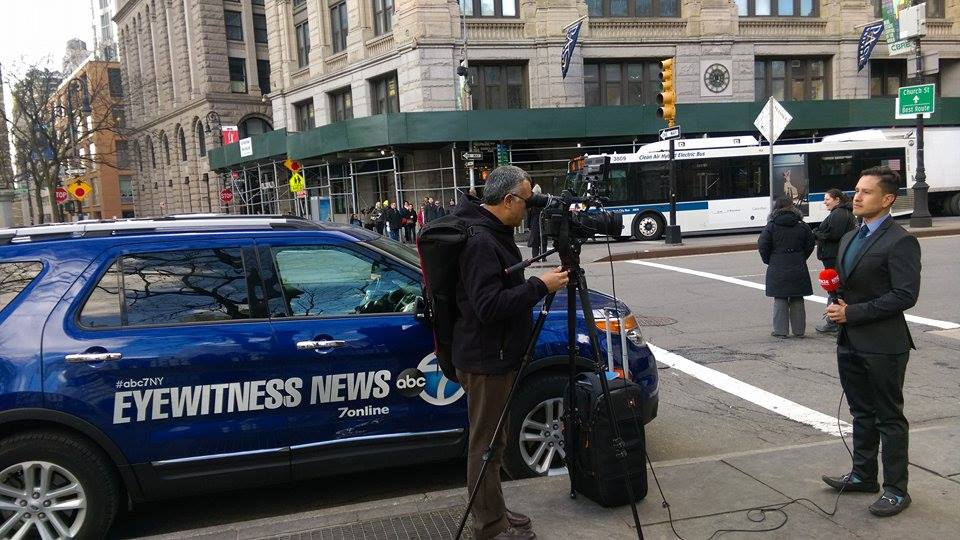
WABC-TV Eyewitness News reporting from Park Row in Manhattan

== News operation ==
WABC-TV presently broadcasts 49 hours, 55 minutes of locally produced newscasts each week (with 7 hours, 35 minutes each weekday; 5 1/2 hours on Saturdays; and 6 1/2 hours on Sundays). The station partners with Philadelphia sister station, WPVI-TV—which popularized the Action News format—in the production and broadcast of statewide New Jersey political debates. When the two stations broadcast a statewide office debate, such as for Governor or U.S. Senate, they pool resources and have anchors or reporters from both stations participate in the debate. Additionally, the two stations share coverage of news from New Jersey where their markets overlap, pooling reporters, live trucks, and helicopters.

=== News department history ===
==== Beginning to 1968 ====
WABC-TV launched Report to New York, its first regular news program, on October 26, 1959, featuring Scott Vincent with news, Howard Cosell with sports, and Lynn Dollar with the weather. Report to New York aired Monday through Friday at 11 pm. By January 1961, channel 7 expanded Report to New York with a 15-minute early edition at 6:15 p.m. on weeknights, and on Saturday and Sunday evenings.

On October 22, 1962, WABC-TV expanded its weeknight news to 45 minutes, and retitled it The Big News. Newcomers Bill Beutel and Jim Burnes were the anchors, with Cosell continuing on sports and Rosemary Haley as "weather girl". However, this effort failed to draw viewers from the ratings leader WCBS-TV and second-place WNBC-TV.

==== The Eyewitness News era ====
In early 1968, Beutel left the station to become the London bureau chief for ABC News and was replaced by Roger Grimsby, who was transferred by ABC from San Francisco sister station KGO-TV. In a complete revamp, Grimsby was joined by Tex Antoine doing weather, celebrity gossip columnist Rona Barrett, New York Daily News columnist Jimmy Breslin with political commentary and reviews by Martin Bookspan and Allan Jeffries, while Cosell continued doing sports. Known as Roger Grimsby and the Noisemakers, this format did not help the ratings, which plunged to an all-time low.

Later that year, newly hired news director Al Primo brought to WABC-TV the Eyewitness News format and branding, in which reporters present their stories directly to the viewers. Having experienced great success introducing the format during his time at KYW-TV in Philadelphia, Primo this time added a twist – a degree of conversational chatter among the anchors, known as "happy talk". The "Tar Sequence" cue from the musical score of the 1967 film Cool Hand Luke, composed by Lalo Schifrin, was introduced as the theme music. The score included a telegraphic-style melody appropriate for a newscast. The Eyewitness News format and theme music were quickly adopted by ABC's other four owned-and-operated stations at the time: KGO-TV, WLS-TV in Chicago, WXYZ-TV in Detroit and KABC-TV in Los Angeles (though KGO-TV and WXYZ-TV did not use the Eyewitness News title for their programs). The format quickly rejuvenated a station that had long been an also-ran to WCBS-TV and WNBC-TV. Within a year, Channel 7 had shot to first place in the ratings for the first time in its history, displacing longtime leader WCBS-TV. It spent most of the decade going back and forth with WCBS-TV for first place. For a time in the 1980s, it fell into last place among the network-owned stations, but still fought with WNBC-TV for second place.

Anchormen Roger Grimsby and Bill Beutel in 1972.

Retaining only Grimsby, Cosell, and Antoine from the earlier Noisemakers format, Primo also hired Tom Dunn away from WCBS-TV to serve as Grimsby's co-anchor. After Dunn departed for WOR-TV in 1970, Bill Beutel returned to the station as his replacement, and for the next 16 years Grimsby and Beutel were the faces of Eyewitness News.

The Grimsby-Beutel team were split up for several months in 1975 after ABC had reassigned Beutel to its new morning show, AM America that January. The station brought in WXYZ-TV's Bill Bonds and veteran Boston anchor Tom Ellis to help replace Beutel, with Grimsby teaming with Ellis at 6 p.m. and Bonds at 11 pm. When AM America was canceled and replaced with Good Morning America in November 1975, Beutel was re-teamed with Grimsby at 6 p.m, with Ellis joining Bonds at 11 pm. Bonds returned to Detroit in June 1976 and was replaced by Larry Kane, who lasted only one year as the sole 11 p.m. anchor before returning to his home market of Philadelphia. Ellis remained until May 1977 and Kane's successor, Ernie Anastos, began his New York career at the station; he co-anchored at 11 p.m. with Rose Ann Scamardella and later Kaity Tong for most of his tenure there.

On November 30, 1981, the station became the second in the city to expand its late afternoon/evening newscasts by adding of a 5 p.m. edition. The broadcast was initially anchored by weather forecaster Storm Field along with Scamardella; Anastos, and later Tong, would replace them. Tom Snyder, who joined WABC after his late night talk show, Tomorrow, was canceled, would take Anastos' place in 1982 and would remain at the station until 1984; WABC attempted an early afternoon, feature-driven newscast shortly thereafter with Anastos and Beutel anchoring Eyewitness Extra, but the program was short lived and was canceled in early 1983.

In 1985, the station lured WLS-TV's news director, Bill Applegate, from Chicago to New York City. Applegate claimed credit for taking WLS-TV from last to first in only two years and ABC hoped he could work the same magic at the flagship station. In the wake of declining ratings, Grimsby was fired on April 16, 1986, a move for which Applegate drew considerable ire and Grimsby was quickly hired by rival WNBC-TV. In 1987, Channel 7 surged back into first place. It has been the ratings leader in New York City since then, and has grown to become the most-watched broadcast television station in the United States. Beutel stepped down from the anchor desk in 2001, which concluded the longest tenure for a main anchor in New York City television history at that time. His record has since been surpassed by WNBC's Chuck Scarborough and WXTV's Rafael Pineda. Scarborough's uninterrupted run behind the desk is the longest in New York television (since 1974). Pineda is second, having started with WXTV in 1972, retiring in 2013 after 41 years.

==== 2000–present ====
WABC-TV's news department is respected for its straightforward presentation (especially during breaking news). For over 24 years (December 1986 to May 2011), the lead-in for the 5 p.m. Eyewitness News broadcast had been The Oprah Winfrey Show at 4 p.m. and its strong ratings brought viewers along to the 5 p.m. newscast.

The newscasts were replayed on one of channel 7's digital subchannels, another which also carried local weather and news channel. WABC-TV's website had a link for live streaming video of "Channel 7 Eyewitness News NOW", which offered live local and national weather updated from AccuWeather alongside local news. The format of "Eyewitness News NOW" is similar to the defunct NBC Weather Plus. On February 24, 2011, AccuWeather and ABC both replaced ENN as well as similar news channels on WABC-TV's sister stations, KABC-TV in Los Angeles and WLS-TV in Chicago, replacing them in all three cities with a standard definition, letterboxed simulcast of the Live Well Network, and then on April 15, 2015, these stations were replaced by Laff.

On December 2, 2006, WABC-TV became the second station in the New York City market to begin broadcasting its local newscasts in high definition. On September 7, 2010, WABC-TV expanded its weekday morning newscast, moving its start time to 4:30 am. Three days earlier on September 4, 2010, WABC added an hour-long extension of its Saturday morning newscast from 9 a.m. to 10 am. On May 26, 2011, WABC-TV added another hour of local news at 4 p.m. to replace Oprah, which aired its last original episode the previous day.

On September 24, 2011, the station began broadcasting its newscasts and public affairs programs from a new street-level window studio at a former Disney Store location in the ABC building on 66th Street and Columbus Avenue. The space previously used for news broadcasts was used to expand the Live with Kelly studio. In January 2012, the station also expanded its weekend 11 p.m. newscasts to an hour. On September 8, 2014, the station expanded its Noon newscast to one full hour from the previous half-hour.

On January 31, 2022, WABC announced they would be launching a streaming channel titled "ABC 7 New York 24/7 Stream". As part of the launch of the service, WABC announced a new 6:30 p.m. newscast, available only through the stream.

On September 11, 2023, WABC-TV, along with sister stations WPVI-TV and WTVD in Durham, North Carolina, launched an additional hour-long newscast at 10 a.m. which took over the time slot previously occupied by Tamron Hall. The broadcast delivers news in a traditional format, and also allows more focus to be placed on local newsmakers, and further discussion on topics addressed on Good Morning America and Live with Kelly and Mark. WABC delayed its launch by one day, due to coverage of events in the city, marking the anniversary of the attacks of September 11, 2001.

WABC-TV left its longtime home of Lincoln Square for a new Disney campus, located at Hudson Square in Lower Manhattan, on February 22, 2025.

=== Notable current on-air staff ===
==== Anchors ====
- Sade Baderinwa
- Sandra Bookman – also host of Here and Now
- Michelle Charlesworth – also reporter and fill-in anchor
- Liz Cho – also host of Eyewitness News UpClose
- David Novarro
- Tanya Rivero
- Joe Torres – also host of Tiempo and fill-in anchor

==== Weather ====
- Sam Champion
- Lee Goldberg (AMS Seal of Approval) – chief meteorologist

==== Sports ====
- Ryan Field – sports director
- Sam Ryan – sports reporter

==== Reporters ====
- N.J. Burkett – general assignment reporter
- Shannon Sohn – NewsCopter 7 reporter
- Toni Yates – general assignment reporter; fill-in anchor

=== Notable former on-air staff ===
- Roz Abrams
- Ernie Anastos
- Tex Antoine
- Steve Bartelstein
- Bill Beutel
- Bill Bonds
- Jim Bouton
- Spencer Christian
- Lisa Colagrossi
- Bertha Coombs
- Victoria Corderi
- Howard Cosell
- Penny Crone
- Tom Dunn
- Tom Ellis
- Bill Evans
- Dave Evans
- Storm Field
- Ira Joe Fisher
- Amy Freeze
- Frank Gifford
- Lauren Glassberg
- Carlos Granda
- Roger Grimsby
- Mark Haines
- Robb Hanrahan
- Steve Hartman
- Edye Hill (Tarbox)
- Carol Iovanna
- John Johnson
- Larry Kane
- Bob Lape
- Judy Licht
- Nancy Loo
- Dorothy Lucey
- Felipe Luciano
- Joan Lunden
- Sal Marchiano
- Art McFarland
- Corey McPherrin
- Larry Mendte
- George Michael
- Tim Minton
- Rob Nelson
- Mary Nissenson
- Gil Noble
- Mike Parker
- Jim Paymar
- Jeff Pegues
- Charles Perez
- Tappy Phillips
- Richie Powers
- Rob Powers
- Shimon Prokupecz
- Bill Ritter
- Geraldo Rivera
- Susan Roesgen
- Gloria Rojas
- Ken Rosato
- Jeff Rossen
- Rose Ann Scamardella
- John Schubeck
- Marvell Scott
- Rosanna Scotto
- Joel Siegel
- Tom Snyder
- Lara Spencer
- Lori Stokes
- Spencer Tillman
- Lee Thomas
- Melba Tolliver
- Kaity Tong
- John Bartholomew Tucker
- David Ushery
- Scott Vincent
- Rolonda Watts
- Diana Williams
- Joe Witte
- Warner Wolf
- Jenna Wolfe
- Eli Zaret

== Subchannels ==
The station's signal is multiplexed:

Subchannels of WABC-TV
Subchannel	Res.	Short name	Programming
7.1	720p	WABC 7	ABC
7.2	720p	LOCLish	Localish
7.3	480i	Charge	Charge!
7.4	480i	HSN	
11.1	720p	PIX11	The CW (WPIX)

Broadcast on behalf of another station

== Carriage disputes ==
=== Cablevision (2010) ===
On March 7, 2010, at 12:02 am. WABC-TV's signal was removed from Cablevision's New York area systems (including iO Digital Cable) after the two sides failed to reach terms on a new retransmission consent agreement; the station was replaced by either a blank screen or a looping video containing a message from Cablevision about the removal. To avoid interruption of programming, the station urged Cablevision subscribers in the station's viewing area (totaling up to three million subscribers) to switch to other services, such as Verizon FiOS and DirecTV or simply view the station over the air through an over-the-air digital antenna and if necessary, a digital converter box, for older television sets. WABC's sister station, WPVI-TV in Philadelphia, was also pulled from Cablevision's New Jersey systems in Mercer, Ocean and Monmouth counties.

Later that same day at approximately 8:50 p.m. 20 minutes into ABC's broadcast of the 82nd Academy Awards, Cablevision and ABC reached a deal, restoring WABC and WPVI's signals for Cablevision subscribers after a nearly 21-hour blackout.

=== Time Warner Cable (2010) ===
In July 2010, ABC's parent company Disney announced that it was involved in a carriage dispute with Time Warner Cable (now Spectrum), its first with that provider in 10 years. This dispute involved four ABC owned-and-operated stations (WABC-TV and sister stations KABC-TV, WTVD and WTVG in Toledo, Ohio [the latter station would be sold by ABC the next year]), Disney Channel and the ESPN networks. If a deal was not in place, the affected stations and cable channels would have been removed from Time Warner Cable and Bright House Networks systems across the country. On September 2, 2010, Disney and Time Warner Cable reached a long-term agreement to keep the channels on Time Warner Cable systems.

=== Charter Spectrum (2023) ===
On August 31, 2023, Disney removed all of its channels, including WABC-TV, two other ABC-owned stations, and the ESPN networks, from Spectrum cable systems due to a carriage dispute, its first with the provider since 2010 when its predecessor, Time Warner Cable, was involved in a dispute with Disney. On September 11, 2023, the stations and their sister cable channels were restored by Charter Communications (the parent company of Spectrum) after the company and Disney reached an agreement.

=== DirecTV (2024) ===
On September 1, 2024, Disney pulled its networks from DirecTV after the two sides failed to reach a distribution deal. The removal, which included WABC-TV and ESPN, would ultimately impact the New York Jets' season-opening game on Monday Night Football against the San Francisco 49ers (ABC simulcast ESPN's coverage of the game). Disney and DirecTV ended their standoff on September 14, restoring WABC and ESPN to the satellite provider.

== See also ==
- Circle 7 logo
- List of television stations in New York (by region)
- Media in New York City
- New Yorkers in journalism
- WABC (770 AM)
- WPLJ (95.5 FM)
