= Susan Roesgen =

American television reporter

- Education: B.A. degree in English Literature, Montana State University
- Occupation: Journalist
- Notable credit(s): CNN general assignment correspondent (2005–2009); National Geographic Today Co-host (2000–2003) WGNO-TV New Orleans, Anchor, 2011–present.
- Title: News Correspondent

Susan Roesgen is an American television reporter. She has worked in radio and television broadcasting for more than two decades, including prime time news anchor positions at several TV stations. She has worked as a general assignment correspondent for CNN from 2005 to 2009, and now works for New Orleans TV station WGNO (Channel 26), the local ABC television affiliate.

== Early life and career ==
Susan Roesgen is the daughter of William Roesgen, former publisher of several newspapers and editor of the Billings Gazette, and sister to Andy Roesgen, a freelance television reporter. Roesgen graduated magna cum laude from Montana State University in 1983, majoring in English Literature. Roesgen says she "never planned to be in journalism. I thought I'd be some kind of writer, but not in the media." She started as a copyeditor for the MSU Exponent newspaper, and her first television job was writing commercials. She eventually joined the news department, and worked her way up to anchoring the news at WABC-TV in New York City.

Roesgen's reporting has taken her to an Army barracks in Haiti, the Sea of Galilee, and to the pyramids of Egypt. She and two colleagues at WDSU-TV received regional Emmy awards for the documentary A Grave Injustice, on the theft of artifacts from New Orleans historic cemeteries. She also won a Louisiana Associated Press Award for her reporting in Israel.

Roesgen has worked as an anchor or host for the following stations:

- WABC-TV Channel 7 (New York City)
- KFMB-TV Channel 8 (San Diego)
- WITN-TV Channel 7 (Washington, NC)
- KATV-TV Channel 7 (Little Rock)
- WDSU-TV Channel 6 (New Orleans)
- WGNO-TV Channel 26 (New Orleans)

She has also worked as for WWNO-FM, a member station of National Public Radio. Roesgen was a classical music disc jockey, worked on the local show Getting There, and filed news stories for NPR's national broadcasts. She was honored by the Press Club of New Orleans with first place awards in the category of general news in 2004, 2005, and 2006 and in series category in 2005.

== National Geographic ==
She joined the National Geographic Channel in 2000, and co-hosted an international travel show, National Geographic Today.

== CNN ==
Roesgen was hired by CNN as the first news correspondent for their Gulf Coast division in 2005. She was based in New Orleans and covered Hurricane Katrina. Other significant stories she covered for CNN include the Jena Six events in Louisiana, the Drew Peterson case, and the death of Michael Jackson. Roesgen's coverage of the 2009 Red River flood in Fargo, North Dakota, in which she "talks to the camera while passing sandbags and riding a forklift" according to one observer, was mocked by Jon Stewart on Comedy Central's The Daily Show.

She moved to CNN's Chicago bureau in September, 2007. On April 15, 2009, Roesgen interviewed a number of people at a 2009 Tea Party protest in Chicago. The interview attracted a degree of partisan commentary.

In July, 2009, CNN ended Roesgen's contract with the network.
