= Roger Grimsby =

American TV news journalist (1928–1995)

- Grimsby in 1977
- Born: Roger Olin Grimsby; September 23, 1928; Butte, Montana, U.S.
- Died: June 23, 1995 (aged 66); New York City, U.S.
- Education: St. Olaf College, Columbia University
- Occupations: Journalist, television news anchor, actor
- Years active: 1954–1991
- Employer(s): KMOX-TV (1959–1961); KGO-TV (1961–1968); WABC-TV (1968–1986); WNBC-TV (1987–1989); KUSI (1990–1991)
- Spouses: Dorthi Frost (before 1989); Maria Grimsby (m. 1989)
- Children: 1

Roger Olin Grimsby (September 23, 1928 – June 23, 1995) was an American journalist, television news anchor and actor. Grimsby, who for eighteen years was seen on ABC's flagship station WABC in New York City, is known as one of the pioneers of local television broadcast news.

== Early life ==
Roger Grimsby was an orphan who was born in Butte, Montana and raised in Duluth, Minnesota, by a Lutheran minister. After graduating from Denfeld High School in 1946, he attended St. Olaf College in Northfield, Minnesota, before studying history at Columbia University in New York. Grimsby was a U.S. Army veteran who was stationed in Germany before serving in the Korean War. It was during his stint in the Army that the Armed Forces Radio Service (AFRS) sparked his interest in news broadcasting.

== Career ==
Grimsby returned to his native Duluth, Minnesota, where he began his anchoring career in 1954 as an announcer for WEBC radio. He switched to the growing medium of television, working as a correspondent and news director at various television stations around Minnesota and Wisconsin, including WEAU-TV Eau Claire, WISC-TV Madison and WXIX-TV (now WVTV) Milwaukee. He spent two years (1959–1961) at KMOX (now KMOV) in St. Louis before becoming the anchor and news director at ABC-owned KGO-TV in San Francisco in 1961.

In 1968, Grimsby was brought to WABC-TV in New York City, where he started as anchor of WABC's 11:00 p.m. news broadcast Roger Grimsby and the Noisemakers on June 3, 1968. Two days later, he was thrust into the national spotlight as anchor of ABC's coverage of the assassination of Robert F. Kennedy.

In April 1969, WABC dropped John Schubeck from the anchor slot on their 6:00 p.m. broadcast, replacing him with Grimsby, who also continued in the 11:00 p.m. slot.

Grimsby's initial co-anchor on the 6:00 p.m. newscast was former WCBS-TV newsman Tom Dunn, but the man who was most closely identified with him was Bill Beutel, who replaced Dunn in September 1970 and co-anchored the news with Grimsby until 1986. He started each broadcast announcing, "Good evening, I'm Roger Grimsby, here now the news," and then closed with, "Hoping your news is good news, I'm Roger Grimsby". For most of his years at WABC, Grimsby also wrote and delivered a daily weekday afternoon radio newscast on the ABC Entertainment Network, which he considered his "read-in" to the news of the day.

A six-time Emmy winner, Grimsby was fired from WABC in April 1986. In an incident recounted by several of his colleagues, including Tom Snyder, who reported the incident on The Late Late Show soon after Grimsby's death, ABC further punished Grimsby by buying a building on Columbus Avenue across from WABC's Lincoln Square studios, where three bars Grimsby often frequented stood, and evicting the bar owners from the building.

Grimsby was hired by WNBC-TV in May 1987. Beginning in June, his role was almost exclusively as a commentator, as Grimsby would be featured as part of the station's daily Live at Five newscast in a brief segment where he offered his take on a news story of the day with his usual deadpan style. He also worked as an assignment reporter. When WNBC's corporate sibling, WNBC (AM), signed off the air in 1988, Grimsby was dispatched to the radio station's studio to cover the closure live. A late transmitter switch to WFAN (AM) meant that Grimsby's voice was the very last to be heard on WNBC-AM as he declared live to TV viewers, "You heard the countdown. It's over." Grimsby left WNBC in May 1989 when his contract was not renewed.

In 1990, he relocated to California, where he and George Reading of KMST (now KION-TV) in Monterey became the first anchor team on San Diego television station KUSI's newly-launched 10:00 p.m. newscast. After only a few months, Grimsby, citing disenchantment over the direction of KUSI's newscasts, resigned from KUSI in February 1991.

== Death ==
After his retirement, Grimsby returned to New York City and lived on Manhattan's Upper West Side with his wife, Maria, whom he had married in 1989.

On June 23, 1995, Grimsby died at Lenox Hill Hospital from complications due to advanced lung cancer.

== Filmography ==
Roger Grimsby film and television credits
Year	Title	Role	Notes
1971	Bananas	Himself	Film
1980	The Exterminator	Himself	Film
1984	Ghostbusters	Himself	Film
1985	Turk 182	Himself	Film
1986	Power	Commentator	Film
1988	The Equalizer	Newscaster	TV episode: "The Mystery of Manon" (Part 1)
1991	Nothing but Trouble	TV Anchor	Film (final role)
