= Eyewitness News =

American television newscast format

- Genre: News program
- Created by: Al Primo (1959–2022)
- Written by: Nikita Antonov
- Presented by: see below
- Music by: Frank Gari
- Country of origin: United States
- Original language: English

Production
- Executive producer: Frank Traynor (1959–1985)
- Producers: Evans Forlidas; Frank Traynor
- News editor: Jesse I Ettinger
- Production locations: Baltimore, Maryland, United States
- Camera setup: Multi-camera
- Running time: 60 minutes 30 minutes
- Production company: WABC

Original release
- Network: Syndication
- Release: April 6, 1959 – present

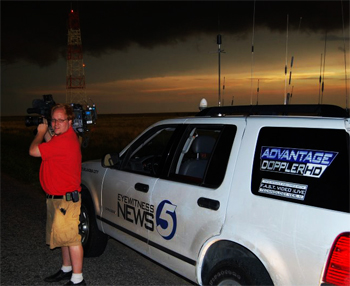
One of KOCO-TV's stormchasing vehicles outside the station's studios in Oklahoma City; as of April 18, 2013, KOCO no longer utilizes the Eyewitness News name (having rebranded as KOCO 5 News). The vehicle also features one of their Doppler weather radar brands.

Eyewitness News is a style of television presentation that emphasizes visual elements and action videos, instead of the older, "man-on-camera" style of newscast, and is most prominently featured in the New York City metropolitan area.

== History ==
=== Westinghouse ===
The earliest known use of the Eyewitness News name in American television was on April 6, 1959, when KYW-TV (now WKYC-TV) – at the time, based in Cleveland and owned by Westinghouse Broadcasting – launched the nation's first 90-minute local newscast (under the title Eyewitness), which was combined with the then 15-minute national newscast. The name was then adopted for use by Westinghouse's other television stations – KPIX in San Francisco; WJZ-TV in Baltimore; WBZ-TV in Boston; and KDKA-TV in Pittsburgh – for their local newscasts.

After the KYW-TV call letters, management, and some staffers moved from Cleveland to Philadelphia in 1965, the station's then-news director, Al Primo, created the Eyewitness News format. In this format, a reporter in the field would be the "eyewitness" to a news event to the anchor in the studio and the viewer at home. The anchors became personalities instead of presenters with the introduction of banter, or "happy talk" as it was named by Al Primo. Anchors would often give their own personal comments in between stories.

Primo used the cue 007 from the 1963 film From Russia with Love as the musical theme. The format quickly became a hit in Philadelphia and allowed KYW-TV to surge past longtime leader WCAU-TV for first place, a position it kept on and off until the late 1970s. KYW-TV's success inspired rival station WFIL-TV (now WPVI-TV) to develop the Action News format to compete with it (after NBC was ordered to re-assume control of its Cleveland broadcasting properties in 1965, the Eyewitness News name left that city until WEWS adopted it for its newscasts in the 1970s).

KYW-TV used the name and format until 1991, and re-adopted it in 1998; the name was dropped altogether in 2023, with station vice president and general manager Kelly Frank saying that "Eyewitness News really was no longer relevant to a modern news and information consumer." All five major stations owned by Westinghouse prior to its 1995 acquisition of CBS have used Eyewitness News as their newscast title at some point in time.

=== Expansion to ABC ===
In 1968, Primo moved to WABC-TV in New York City and took the Eyewitness News concept there with him, choosing music from the 1967 Paul Newman film Cool Hand Luke – the "Tar Sequence" cue (composed by Lalo Schifrin) – as the theme. However, he added a new twist at WABC-TV – light, informal-sounding conversation among the anchors between the news stories and segments, which came to be known as "happy talk". Among the newscasters in the first wave of happy talk on WABC-TV was young reporter Geraldo Rivera, a comical and entertaining weatherman in Tex Antoine, and Bill Beutel and Roger Grimsby as anchormen of contrasting yet complementing styles. Primo also criticized the then-standard practice of "three white men" "preaching the news" at viewers and included women and persons of color to reflect the diversity of the viewing audience. WABC-TV has kept the name and format since then, and has been the highest-rated station in New York City for much of that time.

The format, as modified by WABC-TV, was copied by many other stations in the United States, with four other stations owned and operated by ABC – KABC-TV in Los Angeles, WLS-TV in Chicago, WXYZ-TV in Detroit and KGO-TV in San Francisco – using both the format and the Cool Hand Luke theme (in the case of KGO, since KPIX was already using the Eyewitness News name, KGO titled its newscasts as Channel 7 NewsScene in 1969 and by 1983 simply Channel 7 News. Note KGO-TV did not name their news directly as Eyewitness News until February 2026 when they were free to do so and to have the same branding as their sister stations, while WXYZ used the Action News name since rival WJBK-TV was using the Eyewitness News name for its newscasts; KABC and WLS were free to use the Eyewitness News name as did WABC-TV). Ironically, WPVI, which developed the Action News format, is also now an ABC owned-and-operated station.

In addition, U.S. Spanish-language stations also use their own version of Eyewitness News, called Noticias de Primera Plana (Headline News, a concept translation in Spanish of Eyewitness News) on certain owned-and-operated stations of Spanish networks.

A separate, but mostly unrelated, Eyewitness News format was developed by Irv Weinstein in Buffalo, New York, for WKBW-TV. This format was mostly based not on the original Eyewitness News (though it used the same logo; in actuality, a slightly modified version of it) but rather on the Action News format of its sister stations in the Capital Cities Communications stable. While based on Action News's brief and numerous reports, Weinstein built his Eyewitness News newscast around attention-grabbing catchphrases and alliterative headlines, along with occasional wisecracking or sarcastic one-liners about the day's news stories.

This version of Eyewitness News was used on WKBW as well as other Capital Cities stations including KTRK-TV in Houston and WTVD in Durham, North Carolina, where in the case of the latter, the Action News name was in use by another station. It was also used on a few stations not owned by Capital Cities, including WOKR (now WHAM-TV) in Rochester, New York. Despite its familiarity as a format on ABC owned-and-operated stations, it is actually CBS that owns the rights to the Eyewitness News name, as it originated from KYW-TV.

WKBW dropped the Eyewitness News brand in 2022, as its owner, The E. W. Scripps Company, was convinced the brand was outdated.

=== Outside the United States ===
In Mexico and other Latin American countries during the 1970s and 1980s, some local newscasts also used the Eyewitness News format, under the names Noticias de Primera Plana (Headline News) and Noticias de Acción (Action News).

The title was used in Canada, on CTV affiliate CFRN-TV in Edmonton.

In Indonesia, Metro TV branded its newscasts as iWitness, and abbreviated as Eyewitness. It has since become one of the featured segments on the daytime news program Wide Shot.

In Australia, BTQ-7 in Brisbane adopted the Eyewitness News branding in the early 1970s. The branding was also employed by NWS-9 in Adelaide for its evening newscast. TEN-10 in Sydney and ATV-0/10 in Melbourne, the principal stations of Network Ten, adopted the Eyewitness News branding in the mid-1970s and it was later adopted by other stations in the Network Ten group (SAS-10 in 1976 and TVQ-0/10 in 1978) as BTQ-7 and NWS-9 later relinquished the brand in their respective cities. Regional affiliates for Network Ten also used the Eyewitness News name.

The Australian version of Eyewitness News more closely resembled Weinstein's version than the original format, but it became one of the ratings winners in the 1980s due to its one-hour duration unlike other newscasts. Network Ten dropped the use of the Eyewitness News name in 1988 but later reinstated it in July 1989 for six months, and then again in January 1991 until late 1994. Network Ten reinstated the "Eyewitness News" branding once again on 16 September 2013 until 31 October 2018, when it was retired as part of a network relaunch and replaced with 10 News First.

In South Africa, Eyewitness News is used by Eyewitness News, located in Johannesburg and in Cape Town. It is also used by Talk Radio 702 and 94.7 Highveld Stereo in Gauteng, 567 CapeTalk and 94.5 Kfm in Cape Town.

== United States stations that use or have used the Eyewitness News format or name ==
- ^{1}Indicates station was originally owned by Westinghouse Broadcasting and now is owned-and-operated by CBS
- ^{2}Indicates station is owned-and-operated by ABC

Market Name(s)	Station(s)	Affiliation(s)	Currently or formerly uses	Other notes
Albany, New York	WNYT (formerly WAST)	NBC (formerly CBS and ABC)	No	Used 1969–1975, it was a clone of WABC-TV's Eyewitness News format; has identified as NewsChannel 13 since 1991.
Albany, New York	WTEN	ABC	No	Identified as 10 Eyewitness News 1988–1994; known as News 10 since 1994.
Albuquerque, New Mexico	KOB	NBC	No	Identified itself in 1970 as TV-4 Eyewitness News, in 1984 as Eyewitness News Network, in 1994 as Channel 4 Eyewitness News. and in 1998 as Eyewitness News 4. Now known as KOB 4 News since April 2023.
Amarillo, Texas	KFDA-TV	CBS	No	Used 1974–1980; has identified as NewsChannel 10 since 1995.
Atlanta	WXIA-TV	NBC (formerly ABC)	No	Used from 1969–1972 as WQXI-TV; has identified as 11 Alive News since 1982.
Atlanta	WAGA-TV	Fox (formerly CBS)	No	Used from 1981–1998; has identified as Fox 5 News since 1998; previously it used the title TV-5 News Scene from 1973–1981, borrowing WABC-TV's Eyewitness News format.
Augusta, Georgia	WRDW	CBS	No	Had identified as News 12 since 1998.
Austin, Texas	KXAN-TV (formerly KTVV)	NBC	No	Used from 1973–1984; has identified as KXAN News since 2012.
Austin, Texas	KEYE-TV	CBS	No	Branded itself K-EYEwitness News with its callsign until 1999; has identified as CBS Austin News since 2016.
Bakersfield, California	KBAK-TV	CBS	Yes	Identified itself as 29 Eyewitness News 1992–2009, currently identifies as KBAK Eyewitness News.
Bakersfield, California	KBFX-CD	Fox	Yes	Currently airs Eyewitness News on Fox 58 produced by sister station KBAK-TV.
Baltimore, Maryland	WJZ-TV^{1}	CBS (formerly ABC)	No	Had been identified as Eyewitness News since 1965, dropped branding on October 23, 2017, and is now identified as WJZ News. Rival station WBAL-TV cloned WABC-TV's Eyewitness News format for its TV11 News from 1969–1974.
Bangor, Maine	WVII-TV	ABC	No	Currently identifies as Your Bangor News.
Beaumont/Port Arthur, Texas	KBTV-TV (formerly KJAC-TV)	Roar (formerly NBC and Fox)	No	Used 1969–1977; news department was shut down in 2021
Binghamton, New York	WIVT	ABC	No	Identified as 34 Eyewitness News from 1993 to 1998; has identified as NewsChannel 34 since 1998.
Boise, Idaho	KBOI-TV (formerly KBCI-TV)	CBS	No	Identified as CBS 2 Eyewitness News from 2007 to 2009; currently identifies as KBOI 2 News.
Boston	WBZ-TV^{1}	CBS (formerly NBC)	No	Used 1966–1993; has identified as WBZ News since 2007.
Buffalo, New York	WKBW-TV	ABC	No	Originally used 1970–2003; identified as 7 News from September 8, 2003, to October 27, 2008, when Eyewitness News was restored. Its version of Eyewitness News was in name only and used elements of the Action News format instead. On December 31, 2021, the 7 News branding was restored.
Cedar Rapids, Iowa	KCRG-TV	ABC	No	Used name from the early 1970s to late 1980s; has identified as KCRG TV-9 News since 1994
Charleston, South Carolina	WCBD-TV	NBC	No	Used name from mid-to-late 1980s as an ABC affiliate; has identified as News 2 since 1998
Charleston / Huntington, W.V.	WOWK-TV	CBS	No	Identified as Eyewitness News in the early 1970s until it was purchased by Gateway, who re-branded the newscast as Action News.
Charleston / Huntington, W.V.	WCHS-TV	ABC	No	Used a lowercase "e" logo 2002–2005 and identified as Eyewitness News from 2002 to 2026 without using the channel number (8) in their news title.
Charleston / Huntington, W.V.	WVAH-TV	Roar (formerly Fox and Catchy Comedy)	No	Newscasts during Fox affiliation were produced by sister station WCHS.
Charlotte, North Carolina	WSOC-TV	ABC	Yes	Has identified as Channel 9 Eyewitness News since 1996. Rival station WPCQ-TV (now WCNC-TV) had cloned Group W's original format for its newscasts when it was under Group W ownership.
Charlottesville, Virginia	WVIR-TV	NBC	No	Identified as Eyewitness News 1973–1980; has identified as NBC 29 HD News since 2008.
Chattanooga, Tennessee	WRCB-TV	NBC	No	Identified as (Channel 3) Eyewitness News from 1984 to 2022; has identified as Local 3 News since 2022.
Chicago	WLS-TV^{2}	ABC	Yes	Identified as Eyewitness News 1969–1996 and since October 26, 2013 (as ABC 7 Eyewitness News); as ABC 7 News 1996–2013.
Cincinnati	WLWT	NBC	No	Identified as Eyewitness News 5 1998–2004; has been rebranded as News 5 since 2004.
Cincinnati	WKRC-TV	CBS	No	Identified as Eyewitness 12 News 1977–1992 during ABC affiliation; has identified as Local 12 News since 2004.
Cleveland	WEWS-TV	ABC	No	Used 1972–1991, originally cloned WABC-TV's format from 1972–1974; has identified as News 5 Cleveland since 2016.
Cleveland	WKYC^{1}	NBC	No	The first station (as KYW-TV) to use the Eyewitness News name, on April 6, 1959, used until 1965; has identified as 3 News since 2019.
Colorado Springs / Pueblo, CO	KOAA	NBC	No	Identified as Eyewitness News 1980–2002. Currently identifies as News 5.
Columbia, South Carolina	WOLO	ABC	No	Has identified as ABC Columbia News since 2005.
Columbus, Georgia	WRBL	CBS	No	Was identified as 3 Eyewitness News, now identified as News 3 On Your Side.
Columbus, Ohio	WBNS	CBS	No	Known as 10TV Eyewitness News 1977–2007; rebranded as 10TV News (HD) in April 2007.
Corpus Christi, Texas	KIII-TV	ABC	No	Identified itself as 3 Eyewitness News (1977–2000); has identified as 3 News since 2000.
Dallas / Fort Worth	KDFW	Fox (formerly CBS)	No	Identified as Eyewitness News 1975–1978; has identified as Fox 4 News since 1996.
Dayton, Ohio	WKEF	ABC	No	Used 1972-1974, cloning WABC-TV's Eyewitness News format; has identified as Dayton 24/7 Now since 2019.
Dayton, Ohio	WDTN	NBC (formerly ABC)	No	Identified as Eyewitness News from the 1981 to 1984, but uses the "Action News" format of then sister-stations WBAL, WTAE and WISN; has identified as 2 News since 1990.
Denver, Colorado	KCNC-TV (formerly KOA-TV)	CBS (formerly NBC)	No	Used 1969-1976, it was a clone of WSIX-TV's Eyewitness News format; has identified as CBS News Colorado since 2023.
Denver, Colorado	KWGN-TV	CW (formerly Independent)	No	Identified as TV-2 Eyewitness News 1980–1981; has identified as Channel 2 News since July 2011.
Des Moines, Iowa	WHO-DT	NBC	No	Identified as Eyewitness News in the mid–1970s; has identified as Channel 13 News since 2001.
Des Moines, Iowa	WOI-TV	ABC	No	Identified as Channel 5 Eyewitness News 2001–September 2006; has identified as Local 5 News since 2015.
Detroit	WJBK	Fox (formerly CBS)	No	Identified as Eyewitness News 1968–1997, has identified as Fox 2 News since 1997. Rival station WXYZ cloned WABC-TV's Eyewitness News format for its newscasts.
Detroit	WWJ-TV	CBS	No	Identified as 62 CBS Eyewitness News at 11 in 2002. The newscast was produced by WKBD-TV, which shut down its news department later that year. Newscasts on WWJ-TV resumed in 2023 under the identification of CBS News Detroit
Duluth, Minnesota	WDIO-TV	ABC	No	Used from 1988 until January 2019; rebranded as "WDIO News" in January 2019.
Elmira, New York	WENY-TV	ABC	No	Used from the 1970s through the 1990s. Station now brands as WENY-TV News.
Erie, Pennsylvania	WSEE	CBS	No	Used 1968–1978; currently identifies as WSEE NewsWatch. Station operated by WICU-TV in a local marketing agreement since 2002, with news departments being consolidated since 2009.
Eugene, Oregon	KEZI	ABC	No	Identified as Eyewitness News from the 1970s to the late 1990s; has identified as KEZI 9 News since 2007.
Eureka, California	KIEM	NBC (formerly CBS)	No	Identified as Eyewitness News from around the early 1970s until 1996; currently identifies as Redwood News.
Evansville, Indiana	WEHT	ABC	Yes	Used since December 1, 2011, after the station merged its news operations with WTVW as part of a local marketing agreement.
Evansville, Indiana	WTVW	The CW (formerly Fox and ABC)	Yes	Used from the mid-1970s to 1996; identified as Fox 7 News 1996–2004 and 2005–2011, WTVW NewsChannel 7 2004–2005 and Local 7 News from July 1 to December 1, 2011, when WTVW began identifying as Eyewitness News again after the station entered into a local marketing agreement with WEHT.
Fargo/Grand Forks	KRDK-TV (formerly KXJB-TV)	Cozi TV/MyNetworkTV (formerly CBS)	No	Identified as KX 4 Eyewitness News from 1980 to 1987 when it was affiliated with CBS.
Flint / Saginaw / Bay City	WEYI-TV	Roar (formerly CBS and NBC)	No	Used Eyewitness News name in parts of the 1970s and 1980s; Used variant WEYI-witness News in the early 1990s; news department was shut down in 2025
Florence / Myrtle Beach, S.C.	WBTW	CBS	No	Used from the early 1980s to 1995; currently identifies as News 13.
Fort Myers, Florida	WBBH	NBC	No	Identified as TV-20 Eyewitness News from the late 1970s to 1996; later identified as NBC 2 News from 1996 to 2025 and now identified as Gulf Coast News since February 5, 2025.
Fort Wayne, Indiana	WPTA	ABC	No	Identified as Eyewitness News from the early 1970s to 1978; currently identified as 21Alive News since 2012 (except from 2016 to 2022 when it was branded as ABC 21 News).
Fresno, California	KGPE (formerly KJEO)	CBS (formerly ABC)	Yes	Identified as 47 Eyewitness News from 1985 to 1992; has identified as CBS 47 On Your Side News since 2004. On October 9, 2013, rebranded as CBS 47 Eyewitness News.
Grand Rapids / Kalamazoo, Michigan	WZZM-TV	ABC	No	Identified as Area 13 Eyewitness News 1975–1984 & 1995–1997, and Eyewitness News 13 1984–1995. Currently identifies as WZZM 13 News.
Green Bay, Wisconsin	WFRV-TV	CBS (formerly NBC, then ABC)	No	Used from the mid-1970s to 2001; has identified as Local 5 News since 2012.
Greensboro / High Point / Winston-Salem, N.C.	WGHP	Fox (formerly ABC)	No	Identified as TV-8 Eyewitness News from June 17, 1974, to 1986; has identified as Fox 8 News since 1995.
Greenville / New Bern / Washington, N.C.	WITN	NBC	No	Used variant EyeWITNess News for several years; has identified as WITN News since 2007.
Greenville / New Bern / Washington, N.C.	WNCT	CBS	No	Identified as Eyewitness News 9 from 1998 to 2012, now identifies as 9 On Your Side.
Greenville / Spartanburg / Asheville	WSPA	The CW (formerly CBS)	No	Identified as Eyewitness 7 News from 1974 to 1979, and as 7 Eyewitness News from 1979 to 1994; has identified as 7 On Your Side since 2011.
Harlingen / Brownsville / McAllen, TX	KRGV-TV	ABC	No	Used in the mid-1970s; has identified as NewsChannel 5 since 2000 and as of September 2009, it is now known as Channel 5 News.
Harlingen / Brownsville / McAllen, TX	KGBT	The CW Plus (formerly CBS and Antenna TV/MyNetworkTV)	No	Identified as Eyewitness News from 1967 to 1977 when it was affiliated with CBS; later identified as CBS 4 News (via simulcast with KVEO-DT2) from 2021 to 2026.
Harrisburg / Lancaster / York / Lebanon, PA	WHP-TV	CBS	No	Identified as Eyewitness News 21 from the mid-1990s until 2002; has identified as WHP CBS 21 News since 2004.
Harrisburg / Lancaster / York / Lebanon, PA	WXBU (formerly WLYH-TV)	Univision (formerly CW)	No	Identified as Eyewitness News at 10 from 1995 to 1999 and as 15 Eyewitness News from 2001 to September 2003, when the newscast was dropped; newscasts prior to dropping CW in 2016 were identified as CBS 21 News at 10; sister station to WHP-TV.
Hartford / New Haven, CT	WFSB	CBS	Yes	Has identified as (Channel 3) Eyewitness News since 1974.
Honolulu, Hawaii	KHON-TV	Fox (formerly NBC)	No	Used from the early-to-late 1970s; has identified as KHON 2 News since 2003.
Houston	KTRK-TV^{2}	ABC	Yes	Has identified as 13 Eyewitness News since 1973, a clone of WKBW-TV's Eyewitness News format. From 2015 to present, it is also identified as ABC 13 Eyewitness News although both identities (with or without ABC), are used interchangeably. Also produced ABC 13 Eyewitness News at 9 on CW39 for KIAH-TV from 2020 to 2026.
Huntsville, Alabama	WAAY-TV	ABC	No	Used from 1977 until the late 1990s; has identified as WAAY 31 News since 2000.
Idaho Falls / Pocatello	KPVI	NBC	No	Identified as Channel 6 Eyewitness News during the 1990s; currently known as KPVI News 6; was a clone of WKBW-TV's Eyewitness News format.
Idaho Falls / Pocatello	KIDK	MeTV (formerly CBS and Dabl)	No	Identified as Channel 3 Eyewitness News from 2007 to 2023 (now airing on KIFI-DT2). KIDK-DT2, a simulcast of Fox affiliate KXPI-LD, now known as Local News 8.
Indianapolis	WTHR	NBC (formerly ABC)	No	Identified since 1971 as Eyewitness News (as WLWI), was a clone of WABC-TV's Eyewitness News format, and in 1976 as Eyewitness NewsCenter 13; later identified as Channel 13 Eyewitness News (1995-2020); then as 13 News since then.
Jackson, Mississippi	WAPT	ABC	No	Used Eyewitness News 16 during the early 1990s; has identified its newscasts as 16 WAPT News since 1997.
Jackson, Mississippi	WJTV	The CW (formerly CBS)	No	Used Eyewitness News during the 1970s and 1980s; has identified its newscasts as WJTV 12 News.
Jackson, Tennessee	WBBJ	ABC	Yes	Identified as just Eyewitness News from 1994 to 1999, then as 7 Eyewitness News from 1999 to 2007; has identified as ABC 7 Eyewitness News since 2007.
Jacksonville, Florida	WJXT	Independent (formerly CBS)	No	Identified as Eyewitness News from the 1970s to 2005, similar to WTOP-TV's format; has identified as News 4 Jax since 2014.
Johnson City, Tennessee	WJHL-TV	CBS	No	Identified itself in 1985 as TV-11 Eyewitness News, and in 1989 as Eyewitness News 11; has identified as News Channel 11 Connects since 2009.
Kansas City, Missouri	KCTV	CBS	No	Used Eyewitness News branding 1966–1984; has identified as KCTV 5 News since 1999.
Knoxville, Tennessee	WATE-TV	ABC (formerly NBC)	No	Used various versions of the Eyewitness News moniker 1969–2001, currently known as WATE 6 News.
Lafayette, Louisiana	KLFY	CBS	No	Eyewitness News was used to identify the 6 & 10 p.m. newscasts; was first used in the mid-1980s through 2011. Now known as KLFY News 10.
Laredo, Texas	KLDO	Univision (formerly ABC)	No	Identified as Laredo Eyewitness News in the 1980s as an ABC affiliate; now identifies as Spanish-language Noticias Univision 27.
Las Vegas, Nevada	KLAS	CBS	No	Identified as Eyewitness News 8 from 1982 to 1989 and as Channel 8 Eyewitness News from 1989 to 2009; currently identifies as 8 News Now.
Lexington, Kentucky	WTVQ	ABC	No	Used variant TVQ Eyewitness News for several years; has identified as ABC 36 News since 2009.
Lincoln, Nebraska	KLKN	ABC	No	Identified as Channel 8 Eyewitness News until 2021, currently known as Channel 8 News.
Little Rock, Arkansas	KARK-TV	NBC	No	Identified as Channel 4 Eyewitness News from the 1970s to the mid-1980s and again from the late 1980s–1994; has identified as KARK 4 News since 2005.
Los Angeles, California	KABC-TV^{2}	ABC	Yes	Identified as (Channel 7) Eyewitness News 1969–1997, then ABC 7 Eyewitness News since then. Also produced 8 p.m. (later 7 p.m.) editions of ABC 7 Eyewitness News for then-independent station KDOC-TV from January 2014 to July 2022.
Louisville, Kentucky	WLKY	CBS (formerly ABC)	No	Identified as 32 Eyewitness News from 1969 to 1977 when it was an ABC affiliate; has identified as WLKY News since 2008.
Lubbock, Texas	KCBD-TV	NBC	No	Identified as Eyewitness News from the 1970s to the early 1980s, has identified as Newschannel 11 since 1997.
Madison, Wisconsin	WISC-TV	CBS	No	Identified as TV-3 Eyewitness News from September 13, 1971, to April 24, 1982, has identified as News 3 since 1989.
Madison, Wisconsin	WKOW	ABC	No	Used Eyewitness News from the mid-1980s to 1995, currently identifies as WKOW 27 News.
Macon, Georgia	WMAZ	CBS	No	Identified itself as Eyewitness NewsCenter from 1977 to 1979, as Eyewitness News from 1979 to 1992 and as 13 WMAZ Eyewitness News from 1992 to April 18, 2018, when the "Eyewitness" name was dropped from the title; now identified as 13 WMAZ News
Marquette, Michigan	WJMN-TV	ABC (formerly NBC, ABC, CBS, then MyNetworkTV)	No	Former semi-satellite of WFRV-TV 5 in Green Bay, Wisconsin from 1969 to 2023; now a semi-satellite of WBUP 10 in Ishpeming, Michigan since 2024. Used from the mid-1970s to 2001; has identified as My UP News since 2024.
Medford / Klamath Falls, Oregon	KOBI/KOTI	NBC	No	Newscast on KOBI currently identifies as NBC 5 News (KOTI is now a repeater of KOBI)
Memphis, Tennessee	WHBQ-TV	Fox (formerly ABC)	No	Identified as Eyewitness News from the early 1970s to 1995 and Fox 13 Eyewitness News from 1995 to 1997; has identified as Fox 13 News since 1997
Memphis, Tennessee	WATN-TV (formerly WPTY)	ABC	No	Has identified as ABC 24 News Right Now since 2021, news department shared with WLMT
Minneapolis / Saint Paul, Minnesota	KSTP-TV	ABC (formerly NBC)	Yes	Has identified as 5 Eyewitness News since 1973
Minneapolis / Saint Paul, Minnesota	KMSP-TV	Fox (formerly ABC, Independent, UPN)	No	Used 1969–1973 as an ABC affiliate; has identified as Fox 9 News since 2002
Miami	WPLG	Independent (formerly ABC)	No	Cloned WTOP-TV's format in the 1970s. Used 1983–2001; has identified as Local 10 News since 2004.
Milwaukee, Wisconsin	WISN-TV	ABC	No	Used the title when it was a CBS affiliate from 1973 to 1976, it was a clone of WABC-TV's Eyewitness News format; currently identifies as WISN 12 News since 1997.
Milwaukee, Wisconsin	WITI	Fox (formerly CBS)	No	Identified as TV-6 Eyewitness News in 1970s; currently known as Fox 6 News.
Nashville, Tennessee	WKRN-TV	ABC	No	Used 1969–1972 as WSIX-TV; has identified as News 2 since 1994.
Nashville, Tennessee	WTVF	CBS	No	Used the early 1970s–1989; has identified as NewsChannel 5 since 1989.
New Orleans, Louisiana	WWL-TV	CBS	No	Identified itself as Eyewitness News from 1968 to 2023. Now identifies as WWL Louisiana News.
New York City	WABC-TV^{2}	ABC	Yes	Originally identified as just Eyewitness News, then as Channel 7 Eyewitness News beginning 1984–1998; was identified as ABC 7 Eyewitness News 1999–2003 before reverting to Channel 7 Eyewitness News in 2004. Originator of the Eyewitness News format on April 6, 1959
Norfolk / Portsmouth / Newport News	WTKR	CBS	No	Identified as Channel 3 Eyewitness News 1992–1994, has identified as NewsChannel 3 since 1995
Norfolk / Portsmouth / Newport News	WAVY-TV	NBC	No	Identified as Area 10 or Channel 10 Eyewitness News 1969–1982, has identified as WAVY News 10 since 1989.
Oklahoma City	KOCO-TV	ABC	No	Identified as Channel 5 Eyewitness News 1974–1977, then as Eyewitness News 5 1998–2013; now identifies as KOCO 5 News
Oklahoma City	KWTV	CBS	No	Used Eyewitness News title 1966–1971, has identified as News 9 since 1997.
Orlando / Daytona Beach	WFTV	ABC	Yes	Has identified as Eyewitness News since 1976.
Orlando / Daytona Beach	WRDQ	Independent	Yes	WFTV produces newscasts identified as Eyewitness News This Morning and Eyewitness News at 10 PM.
Philadelphia	KYW-TV^{1}	CBS (formerly NBC)	No	The Eyewitness News format was originally introduced at this station in 1965; dropped name from 1991 to use different names for different dayparts; rebranded as News 3 in 1994 and reverted to Eyewitness News in 1998. The name was dropped again in 2023, now identifies as CBS News Philadelphia
Phoenix	KTVK	Independent	No	Used 1981–1986 (at that time an ABC affiliate); currently identifies as 3TV News.
Phoenix	KPHO-TV	CBS	No	Used in the 1970s (at that time independent); has identified as CBS 5 News since 2004.
Pittsburgh	KDKA-TV^{1}	CBS	No	Used from 1965 to 1996; has identified as KDKA-TV News since 1996 and also as CBS News Pittsburgh since 2023.
Panama City, Florida	WMBB	ABC	No	Identified as 13 Eyewitness News from 1987 to 1996; has identified as News 13 since 2003.
Portland, Maine	WMTW	ABC	No	Has identified as News 8 WMTW since 2000.
Portland, Maine	WCSH	NBC	No	Identified as WCSH Eyewitness News in the 1970s; has identified as News Center Maine since 2018.
Portland, Oregon	KATU	ABC	No	Used 1967–1973; has identified as KATU News since 2003.
Providence, Rhode Island	WPRI	CBS (formerly ABC)	No	Identified as Channel 12 Eyewitness News 1989–1996, was identified as Eyewitness News from 2002 to August 31, 2020, when it re-branded as 12 News; produces 12 News Now at 6:30 & 10 on Fox Providence for WNAC.
Quad Cities – Davenport, Iowa / Moline, Illinois / Rock Island, Illinois / Bettendorf, Iowa / East Moline, Illinois	WHBF-TV	CBS	No	Used the same imaging/graphics as former sister station WOI-TV, identified as Channel 4 Eyewitness News 2002–2007, has identified as Local 4 News since 2015.
Quad Cities – Davenport, Iowa / Moline, Illinois / Rock Island, Illinois / Bettendorf, Iowa / East Moline, Illinois	WQAD-TV	ABC	No	Identified as Eyewitness News 1975–1978, has branded as Quad Cities' News 8 since 2009.
Raleigh/ Durham	WTVD^{2}	ABC	Yes	Used Eyewitness News until dropping for WTVD 11 News in 1985; this was a clone of WKBW's Eyewitness News format. Brought back the title in 2000 as ABC 11 Eyewitness News. Also produced Eyewitness News at 10 on CW22 for WLFL-TV from 2006 to 2022.
Reno, Nevada	KOLO-TV	ABC	No	Identified as Eyewitness News from the mid-'70s to early 1990s; has identified as KOLO 8 News Now since 2007.
Richmond, Virginia	WRIC-TV	ABC	No	Used from the late 1980s to 1992; has identified as 8 News since 1992.
Roanoke, Virginia	WSLS	NBC	No	Used during the 1960s and 1980s, has identified as 10 News since 2017.
Rochester, New York	WHEC	NBC	No	Used from the early-to-late 1970s during its CBS affiliation; has identified as News 10 NBC since 2000.
Rockford, Illinois	WREX	NBC	No	Used when it was an ABC affiliate; has identified as 13 News since 1996.
Sacramento	KXTV	ABC	No	Used 1978–1985 while affiliated with CBS; later was News 10 from 1985 to 2015 and is now ABC 10 News.
St. Louis, Missouri	KSDK	NBC	No	Identified itself in 1969 as just Eyewitness News, then in 1976 as Channel 5 Eyewitness News Central, and in 1979 as Channel 5 Eyewitness News. Now identifies as NewsChannel 5.
Salt Lake City, Utah	KSL-TV	NBC (formerly CBS)	No	Identified as Eyewitness News from the 1970s to 2002, and as KSL 5 Eyewitness News from 2002 to 2009; currently identifies as KSL News.
San Antonio, Texas	KENS-TV	CBS	No	Identified as Eyewitness News 1970–1998, and as KENS 5 Eyewitness News from 1998 to 2022; currently identifies as KENS 5 News.
San Diego, California	KNSD	NBC (formerly ABC)	No	Used 1973–1977 under then-call letters KCST and when it was affiliated with ABC, it was a clone of WABC-TV's format; has identified as NBC 7 News since 2011.
San Francisco	KPIX^{1}	CBS	No	Identified as Channel 5 Eyewitness News from 1965 to 2005 (aside from a brief period in the mid-1990s when it identified as KPIX 5 News), has identified as CBS 5 Eyewitness News from 2005 until 2013. The station adopted KPIX 5 News branding again in early 2013. Rival station KGO-TV borrowed WABC-TV's Eyewitness News format. As of December 2022 KPIX San Francisco has renamed their newscasts CBS News Bay Area as part of a move to name their news operations after their feed on the CBS News app.
San Francisco	KGO-TV^{2}	ABC	Yes	Had previously identified as Channel 7 News Scene from the 1970s to 1982, Channel 7 News from 1982 to 1998 and ABC 7 News from 1998 to 2026 (all previous titles followed the Eyewitness News format). As of February 1, 2026, KGO newscasts have been rebranded as ABC 7 Eyewitness News.
Scranton / Wilkes-Barre, Pennsylvania	WBRE	NBC	No	Identified as 28 Eyewitness News from the 1980s to 2001 and WBRE Eyewitness News since 2008 until 2025. It now goes by "28/22 News" with sister station WYOU.
Seattle	KIRO-TV	CBS	No	Previously used 1981–1987 and 1997–2015, currently identified as KIRO 7 News.
Shreveport / Texarkana	KSLA	CBS	No	Used from the 1980s to the 1990s; currently identifies as KSLA News 12.
Shreveport / Texarkana	KTBS	ABC	No	Used from the 1970s; currently identifies as KTBS 3 News.
Sioux City, Iowa	KCAU-TV	ABC	No	Uses similar imaging/graphics as sister stations WOI-TV, WHBF-TV, and KLKN; identified as Channel 9 Eyewitness News from 2001 to 2013; has identified as ABC 9 News since 2013.
South Bend, Indiana	WSBT	CBS	No	Identified in 1978 as 22 Eyewitness News and in 1983 as WSBT Eyewitness News; has identified as WSBT News since 2007.
Spokane, Washington	KHQ	NBC	No	Identified as Q-6 Eyewitness News in the 1970s, currently identifies as KHQ-6 Local News.
Springfield, Missouri	KSPR	ABC	No	Identified as 33 Eyewitness News 1986–1989, has identified as KSPR News since 2007.
Syracuse, New York	WTVH	Roar (formerly CBS)	No	Identified as Eyewitness News 5 1999–2002, later identified as CBS 5 News from 2005 to 2025.
Syracuse, New York	WSYR (formerly WNYS and WIXT)	ABC	No	Identified as Eyewitness News 1974–1989, currently identifies as Newschannel 9.
Syracuse, New York	WSYT	Fox	No	Identified as Fox 68 Eyewitness News 2000–2006; produced by WTVH. No longer carries a newscast.
Tallahassee, Florida	WCTV	CBS	Yes	Identified as Eyewitness News from the 1980s until 2001, now known as WCTV Eyewitness News.
Tampa / St. Petersburg, Florida	WTVT	Fox (formerly CBS)	No	Branded as Channel 13 Eyewitness News 1989–1996 and briefly as Fox 13 Eyewitness News 1996–1997; has identified as Fox 13 News since 1997.
Tampa / St. Petersburg, Florida	WTSP	CBS (formerly ABC)	No	Used 1970–1977 when the station was WLCY-TV; currently identifies as 10 Tampa Bay News since 2020.
Tampa / St. Petersburg, Florida	WTOG	Independent (formerly UPN and the CW)	No	Used from 1982 to 1985. Viacom shut down the station's news department in 1998.
Terre Haute, Indiana	WTWO-TV	NBC	No	Identified as (TV-2) Eyewitness News 1973–1994, has identified as simply WTWO since 2006.
Toledo, Ohio	WTOL	CBS	No	Identified as Eyewitness News from 1966 to 1974; has identified as WTOL 11 News since 2010.
Topeka, Kansas	KTKA	ABC	No	Identified as 49 Eyewitness News before local news was dropped in 2002, bought by new owners and brought back news in 2006 and currently identifies as 49 News.
Traverse City, Michigan	WGTU	ABC	No	Name used in the 1970s; has identified as UpNorthLive News on ABC 29&8 since September 2010.
Tucson, Arizona	KVOA-TV	NBC	No	Was Eyewitness News at least since the early 1970s, identified as Eyewitness News 4 from 1999 to February 2006, identified as News 4 since February 2006.
Tulsa, Oklahoma	KOTV	CBS	No	Identified as Eyewitness News 1978–1986, has identified as The News On 6 since 1986.
Tyler, Texas	KYTX	CBS	No	Identified as CBS 19 Eyewitness News 2004–2008; currently identifies as CBS 19 News.
Utica, New York	WUTR	ABC	Yes	Identified as Eyewitness News in the 1980s and early-to-mid-1990s. Stopped newscasts in 2003; revived newscasts under the Eyewitness News name in 2011.
Waco, TX	KXXV	ABC	No	Previously identified as Eyewitness News 25 from 1985 to mid-1990s; currently identified as 25 News.
Washington, D.C.	WUSA	CBS	No	Identified as Channel 9 Eyewitness News from 1971–2002 (as WTOP-TV from 1971–1978, later WDVM from 1978–1986 and WUSA since 1986); has identified as WUSA 9 News from 2002–2006 and again since 2013; was previously identified as 9 News Now from 2006–2013.
West Palm Beach, Florida	WPBF	ABC	No	Identified as Eyewitness News 25 1998–2004; has identified as WPBF 25 News since 2009.
West Palm Beach, Florida	WPEC	CBS	No	Used from the late-1980s to the mid-1990s, has identified as CBS 12 News since February 1, 2008.
Wichita, Kansas	KWCH	CBS	No	Identified as Eyewitness News 1969–1977 and again 1983–1995 and then Channel 12 Eyewitness News 1995–2001. Has identified as KWCH 12 Eyewitness News from 2001 to 2022. Now identifies as 12 News since 2022.
Wichita Falls, Texas / Lawton, Oklahoma	KAUZ-TV	CBS	No	Used title Channel 6 Eyewitness News 1974–1988; currently identifies as Newschannel 6.
Wilmington, North Carolina	WWAY	ABC	No	Identified as Eyewitness News 3 1983–1995; has identified as NewsChannel 3 since 1995.
Youngstown, Ohio	WYTV	ABC	No	Identified as 33 Eyewitness News from the late 1970s to 1999; has identified as 33 News since 2004. Both the news department and the station as a whole have been operated by WKBN-TV in a shared services agreement since 2007.
Yuma, Arizona/El Centro, California	KYMA-DT (1988–2020)	Station now defunct	No	Used from 1988–1990 (at that time an ABC affiliate); station, which switched to NBC in 1991, later used News 11 for newscasts until license for station was surrendered in 2020.
