= Good Morning America First Look =

American television news program

- Also known as: ABC News This Morning (1982–1983); World News This Morning (1983–2006); America This Morning (2006–2024)
- Genre: Early-morning news program
- Created by: Roone Arledge
- Presented by: Sophie Flay; Hanna Battah; (for substitute and past anchors, see section)
- Theme music composer: Score Productions (1983–1992 and 1993–2013); Yanni (1992–1993); DreamArtists Studios (2013–present)
- Country of origin: United States
- Original language: English
- No. of seasons: 33

Production
- Production locations: ABC News Headquarters, New York City
- Camera setup: Multi-camera
- Running time: 44 minutes (1982–1992); approx. 23 minutes (1992–present)

Original release
- Network: ABC
- Release: July 5, 1982 – present

Related
- World News Now; Good Morning America

Good Morning America First Look (formerly America This Morning) is an American early morning news program, broadcast on ABC on weekday mornings, as an extension to its main program Good Morning America. As of December 2025, the newscast is anchored by Sophie Flay and Hanna Battah, who also serve as anchors of ABC's overnight news program World News Now which usually airs just prior to this program. It features national and international news headlines, live reports from Washington, D.C., national weather and airport impact forecasts, a short SportsCenter update from the late night Los Angeles-based anchors of the ESPN show to account for West Coast scores, and a regular business news segment called "America's Money".

The program is broadcast live at 3:30 a.m. ET following World News Now (airing in the early timeslot to accommodate ABC stations that start their morning local newscasts at 4:00 a.m.). ABC-owned WPVI-TV was one of the first stations to air local news starting at 4:00 a.m. beginning in September 2018. The show is transmitted in a continuous half-hour tape delayed loop until 10:00 a.m. ET, when Good Morning America begins in the Pacific Time Zone (after 7:00 a.m. ET, any live breaking news requiring network-level coverage is under the purview of GMA with some allowance to start earlier). The program usually airs as a lead-in to local morning newscasts on most ABC stations, although in the few markets where a morning newscast is not produced by the ABC station, it may air in a two- to three-hour loop immediately before the start of GMA.

== History ==
The program originally debuted under the title ABC News This Morning on July 5, 1982. In early 1983, the program was retitled ABC World News This Morning. The program aired live at 6:00 a.m. ET for 60 minutes immediately prior to Good Morning America and was repeated on tape delay for western time zones. It was initially anchored by Steve Bell and Kathleen Sullivan at the network's Washington, D.C. newsroom-studio (as was most ABC News programming at the time). Production of the program was moved to ABC's headquarters in the Lincoln Square, Manhattan district of New York City on July 11, 1988, when Forrest Sawyer and Paula Zahn debuted as co-anchors.

In August 1989, WCBS anchor Mike Schneider became the new anchor for World News This Morning. Schneider also anchored the news on Good Morning America at the same time.

In mid-1992, production of World News This Morning was combined with that of the network's then recently launched overnight news program World News Now, with the same anchor team appearing on both programs. Initially, some elements from World News Now were brought over to World News This Morning including the "Morning Papers" segment and that program's Yanni-composed theme music (played over the original World News This Morning opening graphics) as well as the laid-back attitude.

At some point in 1993, the original Score Productions-composed theme was brought back and most elements from World News Now brought over to World News This Morning were dropped as the program was reformatted to again became more serious in tone. As local stations expanded their morning newscasts, World News This Morning was first shortened into two separate 30-minute newscasts and later to the current, single, 30-minute newscast (which, if an affiliate does not provide a morning news program of its own, can be repeated back-to-back between 4:00 and 7:00 a.m. ET). From the cable network's launch in 1996 until almost all original programming was discontinued due to cost-cutting measures made by ESPN on June 13, 2013, the program's sports update was provided by the overnight anchors of ESPNews, and later on, the Highlight Express; later that year, production of the sports segments was turned over to the Los Angeles-based production and anchor staff for the overnight editions of ESPN's SportsCenter.

The news program celebrated its 20th anniversary during the summer of 2002. On November 13, 2006, the program's title was changed again to America This Morning; with the rebranding, the orchestral theme from Score Productions that had been used since the program's launch (outside of the short period when it was replaced by World News Now's original theme music) was retired permanently, and replaced with a modernized theme. With the rebranding, the program also began to align itself with the branding and on-air presentation of Good Morning America, although it has otherwise remained under the auspices of the World News Now staff. On September 22, 2009, America This Morning and World News Now began broadcasting in high definition; America This Morning, in effect, became the second early morning network newscast to broadcast in HD, after NBC's Early Today.

On August 30, 2010, ABC moved its live broadcast of the program to 4:00 a.m. ET (like its competitors Early Today and the CBS Morning News had already done) to accommodate affiliates that choose to start their morning local newscasts at 4:30 a.m. ET. Some ABC stations (such as WTVC in Chattanooga, Tennessee, which still does not air it today at all) were forced to pre-empt the program when they implemented it less than two months earlier.

As of September 10, 2018, many of ABC's owned and operated stations have begun their morning newscasts at 4:00 a.m. ET, initially pre-empting America This Morning in these regions before ATM later began broadcasting live at 3:30 a.m. ET to accommodate.

On September 30, 2024, the program was rebranded to Good Morning America First Look.

== Newscast structure ==
Block	Standard content
A	Top stories and national weather
B	General news
C	Sports and general news
D	"The Pulse"
E	"Friday Funnies" (Fridays only)

== Notable on-air staff ==
=== Current anchors ===
- Sophie Flay (2025–present)
- Hanna Battah (2025–present)

=== Former anchors ===
- Steve Bell (1982–1986)
- Kathleen Sullivan (1982–1986)
- Jeanne Meserve (1986–1987)
- Jed Duvall (1987–1988)
- Edie Magnus (1987–1988)
- Forrest Sawyer (1988–1989)
- Paula Zahn (1988–1990)
- Mike Schneider (1989–1993)
- Aaron Brown (1993)
- Boyd Matson (1993–1994)
- Thalia Assuras (1993–1997)
- Kevin Newman (1995–1996)
- Mark Mullen (1997–1998)
- Asha Blake (1997–1998)
- Juju Chang (1999–2000)
- Antonio Mora (late 1990s)
- Derek McGinty (2000–2003)
- Alison Stewart (late 1990s-2003)
- Liz Cho (1999–2003) now at WABC-TV in New York City)
- David Muir (2003–2004)
- Ron Corning (2004-2006)
- Hari Sreenivasan (2006–2007; later with PBS NewsHour)
- Ryan Owens (2007–2008)
- Jeremy Hubbard (2008–2010; now at KDVR in Denver)
- Vinita Nair (2008–2011; now with NBC News)
- Rob Nelson (main co-anchor, 2010–2013; substitute anchor, 2013–2018)
- Paula Faris (2012–2013)
- John Muller (2013–2014; now with WPIX in New York City)
- T. J. Holmes (2014–2015)
- Reena Ninan (2014–2016; now a figure competitor)
- Diane Macedo (2016–2018)
- Kendis Gibson (2016–2019; now with WFOR-TV in Miami)
- Kenneth Moton (2019–2021)
- Mona Kosar Abdi (2020–2022)
- Andrew Dymburt (2021–2025)
- Rhiannon Ally (2022–2025)

== Announcers ==
World News/America This Morning has had three announcers in its history. From its 1982 debut until 1990, Bill Owen served as the program's announcer. Following Owen's departure from the network in 1990, he was replaced by Barbara Daniels Korsen, who remained the newscast's announcer until 2012.

== International broadcasts ==
Programming from ABC News, including Good Morning America First Look, is shown daily on the 24-hour news network OSN News in MENA Region.
