= Thalia Assuras =

Canadian television journalist, news anchor, and media consultant

- Born: London, Ontario, Canada
- Education: University of Western Ontario
- Occupations: Journalist, media consultant
- Years active: 1981–present

Thalia Assuras is a Canadian television journalist and media consultant.

== Early years ==
Assuras was born in London, Ontario to parents who immigrated from Tripoli, Greece, after World War II. She attended London Central Secondary School, and remained in London to attend the University of Western Ontario, pursuing a Bachelor of Science degree. She graduated in 1980, then entered the graduate program in journalism and earned her master's degree in 1981.

Twenty-one years later she commented on the impact the journalism program had had on her:

"It's hard to describe my time at Western because it was a phenomenal turning point in my life. I always had these delusions of being a writer and I always overloaded my mind with information and literature. That program just brought things together for me."

== Career ==
Assuras has worked for CITY-TV and Global Television, including a stint as reporter and weekend anchor for CityPulse from 1985 to 1988. She was the evening anchor at Global TV in 1989. From 1992 to 1993 she worked for CTV, anchoring Canada AM. She then moved to ABC, and in May 1993, joined Aaron Brown as co-anchor of World News Now and ABC World News This Morning. She shared that anchor desk with Boyd Matson, fellow Canadian Kevin Newman, and Mark Mullen before leaving ABC in January 1997.

In 1997 she moved to CBS, first joining CBS Eye on People, a cable network that CBS launched in March 1997. She also worked as a national correspondent and later became anchor of the CBS Morning News in 1998. She then become co-anchor of The Saturday Early Show in 1999 and the CBS Evening News Saturday, also in 1999, alternating with Russ Mitchell. In a June 22, 1998 article in Maclean's, Assuras commented on her reason for moving to the United States, saying "I wanted to live in a different country. And I wanted to work where you have all the tools you need on a story." In July 2009, Assuras left CBS after her contract with it expired.

She later anchored energyNOW!, a half-hour weekly TV news-magazine and opinion program produced by the American Clean Skies Foundation; it aired first on WJLA-TV and later on Bloomberg Television. After energyNOW!, she established a "consulting practice for strategic planning, media relations, crisis management, media training and executive coaching."

== Awards and activities ==
Assuras is a founding member of The Next Generation Initiative, a leadership program aimed at getting students involved in public affairs.

The Daughters of Penelope recognized Assuras with the "2000 Salute to Women" award. She was awarded the Marie Torre Memorial Award in 2001.
