= ABC World News Now =

American television news program

- Also known as: World News Now
- Genre: Overnight news program
- Created by: David Bohrman
- Presented by: Sophie Flay; Hanna Battah; (for past anchors, see section)
- Theme music composer: Yanni (1992–2001); JOEDtracks (2001–2004); Score Productions (2004–present)
- Country of origin: United States
- Original language: English
- No. of seasons: 30

Production
- Production locations: ABC News Headquarters, New York City
- Camera setup: Multi-camera
- Running time: 60 minutes (aired in tape-delayed loop)

Original release
- Network: ABC
- Release: January 6, 1992 – present

Related
- Good Morning America First Look

ABC World News Now (or WNN, World News Now) is an American overnight news broadcast seen on ABC. Airing during the early morning hours each Monday through Friday, the program features a mix of general news and off-beat stories, along with weather forecasts, sports highlights, feature segments, and repurposed segments and story packages from other ABC News programs; its tone is often lighthearted, irreverent and humorous.

Created by David Bohrman, who also served as the original executive producer, a number of well-known news personalities have anchored ABC WNN early in their careers, including original anchors Aaron Brown and Lisa McRee, Thalia Assuras, Kevin Newman, Alison Stewart, Liz Cho, Anderson Cooper and current ABC World News Tonight anchor David Muir. The program, along with ABC's early-morning news program Good Morning America First Look, is primarily anchored by ABC News correspondents Hannah Battah and Sophie Flay. ABC News reporter Danny New also contributes to both programs.

WNN is divided into four segment blocks ("A", "B" "C" and "D") that start with national and international news headlines incorporating some pre-taped reports (with some live wraparounds) from ABC NewsOne correspondents or repeated reports from the network's evening news program ABC World News Tonight. The "A"-block also features a national weather forecast, normally from WABC-TV chief meteorologist Lee Goldberg or Jeff Smith on Mondays, and an often humorous "kicker" story that ends the block. The "B," "C" and "D" blocks usually feature a mix of stories from Nightline or other live-to-tape or pre-taped segments produced in-studio, depending on the day of the week.

== History ==
=== 1991–1993 ===
In late 1991 and early 1992, ABC, CBS and NBC each created their own overnight general news programs -- ABC World News Now, Up to the Minute, and NBC Nightside, respectively—to compete for viewer demand that was driven originally by CNN's 24-hour coverage of the Gulf War, and to supply local affiliates with overnight programming. Until the creation of these news programs, owned-and-operated and affiliate stations of the three networks commonly filled overnight timeslots with movies and/or syndicated programs, while some others simply signed off the air for the night. The original working title for the program was World News Overnight; ABC News executives chose to rename the program ABC World News Now prior to the first broadcast.

The program debuted on January 6, 1992, with Aaron Brown and Lisa McRee as its original anchors. Later that year, the production staff of ABC World News Now took over production responsibilities for the network's early-morning news program World News This Morning, sharing anchors as a result. After McRee's departure in January 1993, Brown anchored solo (with a cardboard cutout of McRee in her old seat) until he was joined in May of that year by Thalia Assuras, who at five years became the program's longest-serving anchor when she left in 1998 for CBS News. Brown himself would leave a month later; from then, ABC World News Now would experience significant turnover with its anchor staff that continues to this day.

In the tradition of NBC News Overnight (the predecessor to original rival NBC Nightside), ABC World News Now has featured serious as well as offbeat news stories interspersed with odd features such as the "World News Polka" (played by comedian Barry Mitchell on the accordion), video footage of dancing camels on Wednesdays (for "Hump Day"), and laughter coming from off-camera. Weather predictions were made for obscure and exotic places around the world; some of the locales have had various ties to the show, while some have had popular culture significance, including Cicely, Alaska, and Twin Peaks, Washington.

The program also often replays story packages from other ABC News programs such as Nightline and ABC World News Tonight. It has been an apparent training ground for new news presenters (see list below) who eventually go on to higher-profile positions with the network or local affiliates. The show is also unique for its interactive segments, some of which pioneered the email communication that is commonly used on television newscasts today. The ABC News WNN internet forum has offered viewers questions and comments from the anchors themselves, during the course of the show.

=== 1994–1998 ===
On November 23, 1995, ABC World News Now became the first television program to be streamed live to the public over the Internet, using the CU-SeeMe interface. Victor Dorff, a producer of WNN at the time, arranged to have the show simulcast on the Internet daily for a six-month trial period.

ABC World News Now was used as the prototype for Fred, ABC's plan to operate a cable news channel. The plan was floated by network management in 1995 and was later dropped within a couple of years due to issues with cable carriage, including competition with the recently launched MSNBC and Fox News.

In the fall of 1998, ABC News entered into a labor dispute, resulting in support employees being locked out from the news division's headquarters for several months. While World News This Morning continued to be produced in New York City with substitute production staff, production of ABC World News Now was moved to the news division's London news bureau. Mark Mullen returned to anchor WNN during the last month of the lockout.

=== 1999–2008 ===
Following its CU-SeeMe trial, ABC World News Now later attempted another webcast; between 1999 and 2001, the program was streamed live for free on the ABC News website. In 2005, the free behind-the-scenes webcast returned. Among the anchors of the broadcast during this period was David Muir, who eventually became co-anchor of the newsmagazine 20/20 and became anchor of the weekday editions of ABC World News Tonight in August 2014, who co-anchored ABC World News Now from July 2003 to August 2004 (originally with Andrea Stassou and later with Tamala Edwards).

On June 8, 2006, ABC White House Correspondent Martha Raddatz learned of the death of terrorist Abu Musab al-Zarqawi near Baqubah, Iraq. Upon confirmation of the tip, ABC ran a breaking news at 2:38 a.m. Eastern Time, helmed by WNN anchors Ron Corning and Tai Hernandez. The show, which is normally repeated on tape after the initial broadcast, instead went live in all time zones and into the early-morning news program World News This Morning. The on-air and behind-the-scenes staff stayed on-air until Good Morning America began and took over coverage of the story at 7:00 a.m. Eastern Time.

In January 2007, ABC World News Now celebrated its 15th anniversary, with the brief resurrection of the National Temperature Index (see below) and a new version of the "World News Polka". On August 2, 2007, WNN abandoned its normal format and ran nearly continuous coverage of the I-35W Mississippi River bridge collapse that occurred in Minneapolis the day before; coverage on the program was anchored by Hernández and Stephanie Sy, and continued into America This Morning.

Tai Hernandez left the show on December 18, 2007, in order to spend more time with her children, while Ryan Owens announced on February 29, 2008, that he would be leaving the show to become a full-time correspondent for ABC News. During the week of January 7, 2008, WNN celebrated its 16th anniversary on the air with retrospective segments on the early days of the broadcast and its anchors. Jeremy Hubbard was named co-anchor of ABC World News Now on March 17, 2008, with Vinita Nair being named as Hubbard's co-anchor on September 17 of that year.

=== 2009–2011 ===
On September 22, 2009, ABC World News Now became the first network overnight newscast to begin broadcasting in high definition.

On July 9, 2010, Jeremy Hubbard left WNN to become a full-time correspondent for ABC News; he was replaced as Nair's co-anchor on the program by Rob Nelson. In Hubbard's honor, the ABC World News Now staff looked back at his time with the program and as is tradition when an anchor leaves the show, Hubbard had a picture of his likeness raised into the ABC News rafters. There was also a polka, sung to Hubbard's dog Jake, and Jeremy received a cutout of his likeness as a going away present while also welcoming his replacement, Rob Nelson.

On January 24, 2011, ABC World News Now debuted new graphics for all of the program's segments and began using a new set, a side view of the existing set of ABC World News. On February 17 of that year, Nair announced that she would be departing as co-anchor of ABC World News Now after the next night's broadcast; the February 18 edition paid tribute to Nair in each of its three segments, including appearances from current and former colleagues including Jeremy Hubbard. Her legacy was to treat the crew to a hot breakfast on her last day. A brief send-off by Nelson to Nair was also given at the conclusion of America This Morning. Correspondent Peggy Bunker (then a former anchor at Fox affiliate KDVR) was named as interim successor.

On March 11, 2011, the program provided live coverage (in all time zones) of the devastating Tōhoku earthquake and tsunami in Japan, featuring updates and pictures from NHK World-Japan; the coverage continued during America This Morning and Good Morning America. On July 21, 2011, Bunker announced that she would be leaving ABC World News Now after the July 22 broadcast, which acknowledged her departure in the first and last of its three, half-hour segments during that following night. In addition, a brief send-off by Nelson to Bunker (who subsequently became morning and midday anchor at Seattle ABC affiliate KOMO-TV) was given at the conclusion of America This Morning.

Beginning on July 25, 2011, ABC News correspondents Tanya Rivero, Diana Alvear and Linsey Davis began rotating as co-anchors alongside Nelson until a permanent co-anchor was named; this lasted until Rivero was named sole co-anchor of the program on September 19, 2011. On October 14, 2011, Rivero shifted to a correspondent role on ABC's daytime news programs and was replaced by correspondent Yunji De Nies as a substitute anchor beginning the following day. On October 27, 2011, Paula Faris was named co-anchor of ABC World News Now, taking over the role on January 2, 2012.

=== 2012–2020 ===
On January 6, 2012, the program celebrated its 20th anniversary. Clips and outtakes of the first two decades of WNN were shown throughout that night's broadcast. On June 11, 2012, the longtime "Morning Papers" segment was replaced by "The Mix," which instead of featuring offbeat headlines from various national and international newspapers, focused on stories trending online.

On January 18, 2013, Paula Faris announced that she would be departing ABC World News Now after the January 22 broadcast; on the night Faris left the program, a brief send-off by Nelson to Faris was given at the conclusion of America This Morning. Diana Perez was named as Faris's successor. On March 12, 2013, Rob Nelson announced that he would be leaving the program effective March 15, 2013, to become a full-time correspondent for ABC News. John Muller was named as successor.

Marci Gonzalez filled in for Diana Perez while she was on maternity leave from January 6 to March 26, 2014. Perez later announced on May 29, 2014, that she was leaving ABC World News Now to spend time with her family; John Muller and the staff celebrated her tenure in all three half-hour segments during the May 30 editions, including a visit by former co-anchor Rob Nelson, who remarked that she was the last of 16 co-anchors he had served with on WNN. On June 12, 2014, John Muller announced he was leaving the program to return to his previous employer, New York's WPIX, to become its lead news anchor. In October 2014, T. J. Holmes and Reena Ninan were appointed as co-anchors of ABC World News Now and America This Morning. Ninan's appointment became official on April 8, 2015.

Around August 2015, TJ left ABC World News Now and America This Morning to focus on his contributions to other shows on the network. He "unexpectedly" left the show around August 7, 2015. Kendis Gibson has since served as co-anchor of the show.

On April 4, 2016, Reena announced she was leaving the show to work dayside. Reena had a special sendoff on April 8, 2016, and left the network for an anchor position at CBSN, the CBS online streaming news service. Diane Macedo, formerly of Imus in the Morning, took over as ABC World News Now co-anchor, alongside Kendis Gibson.

On Friday, January 6, 2017, ABC World News Now broadcast an elaborate 25th Anniversary special. All three half hours, except top of the show news summaries, were devoted to archival show clips and reminiscences by former anchors. Predictably irreverent, WNN creator David Bohrman and original anchor Lisa McRee were live in studio to comment on the show's history. Barry Mitchell, accordion in tow, performed a special 25th Anniversary polka ("The work we do's important here, that's what the bosses say/We're warming up the cameras later on for GMA"). Throughout the hour and a half, Bohrman, McRee and a cardboard cutout of Aaron Brown joined then current anchors Kendis Gibson and Diane Macedo at an on-set open bar, along with past and present ABC World News Now staffers.

=== 2020–present ===
As of late summer 2020, a number of stations in major markets dropped ABC World News Now in favor of daytime talk show reruns, such as Live with Kelly and Mark and Tamron Hall. These include ABC-owned stations in New York, Los Angeles, Chicago, Philadelphia, Raleigh–Durham, San Francisco, and Fresno. To quell viewer complaints in affected cities, the show pointed out that the complete broadcast can still be viewed online at 2am Eastern time, five days a week, at abcnews.com, in the "Live" window. ABC World News Now is also live streamed by Hulu, Disney+, Amazon Prime Video, YouTube and ABC News Live. Later in 2020, the decision was made to cease production of ABC World News Now's third half hour, cutting it down to two separate half hours, aired back to back from 2-3am Eastern time, and rerun from 3-4am Eastern time.

== Production ==
=== Newscast structure ===
==== First half-hour ====
Airs live beginning at 2:00 a.m. Eastern Time. Re-airs at 3:00 a.m. Eastern Time.

Block	Standard content
A	Top stories and national weather
B	Presentation of packaged segment.
C	"The Skinny"
D	"Skinny Bonus Round" (optional), "Friday Rewind" (Fridays only)

==== Second half-hour ====
Airs live beginning at 2:30 a.m. Eastern Time. Re-airs at 3:30 a.m. Eastern Time

Block	Standard content
A	Top stories and national weather
B	
C	
D	"The Mix" (abbreviated on Friday mornings, when it is followed by the "World News Now Polka")

=== Regular segments ===
- Top Stories – a summary of national and international stories
- Weather – a summary of expected weather conditions and high temperatures for the upcoming day
- Kicker story – a selected off-beat or human interest story
- What to Watch – A summary of stories to follow throughout the day (2009–present)
- Our Favorite Story of the Day – a segment usually featuring a human interest or off-beat story (2012–present)
- The Skinny – a segment focusing on entertainment news, celebrity gossip and pop-culture (2007–present)
- The Mix – a soft media segment features off-beat stories, viral video clips and funny photographs (2012–present)

=== "B," "C" and "D"-blocks ===
After the A-block, the rest of the half-hour is produced using the following segments:

- Nightline – a rebroadcast of the primary story package from the previous night (or if aired on a Monday, the previous Friday)'s edition of Nightline.
- This Week (Monday mornings only) – a broadcast of the political discussion program's "Roundtable" segment, featuring a debate of pundit from both sides of politics.
- ABC News Vault – a look back at how ABC News covered a story of historical importance, which usually corresponds to the date of the broadcast.
- American Landscape – Team coverage of a major national or international story from the perspective of a local ABC owned-and-operated station or affiliate that covered it, with excerpts from that station's newscasts (commonly the late evening newscast). The segment, which is rarely seen, is often edited for time (this is noticeable due to sudden jumps of the time/temperature bug used by certain stations whose segments are sourced, and jumps between and during story packages).
- GizWiz – Dick DeBartolo talks about and demonstrates the newest gadgets and technology.
- Viewers' Voice – a segment in which the anchors read viewer opinions about a specific topic from the program's Facebook page or e-mail inbox.
- Insomniac Theater – Appearing on Fridays, the segment features a ABC World News Now staff member giving their review (from a score of 1 to 5) of a recent movie release. This segment is ad-libbed and usually contains a SOT from the movie press kit. Previously, the films were reviewed by the anchors.
- Insomniac Kitchen – WNN anchors visit a local New York City restaurant to get ideas for late-night snacks that viewers can make at home.

=== Special segments ===
- Friday mornings close with some version of the "World News Polka" – usually performed by the song's composer, comedian Barry Mitchell (most commonly, the version recorded in 1998) – aired while the show's production credits are scrolled.
- When a full-time anchor of ABC World News Now finally leaves the program, a ceremony of sorts is held on their last broadcast. As the first few anchors moved on, cardboard cutouts were placed in the rafters of the studio for the "Anchor Hall of Fame." Today, this is done with a graphics sequence of a head-shot of the anchor moved into a graphic of the original set's rafters and monitors.

=== Former segments ===
- Randomly, throughout the broadcast, a "new e-mail" sound effect will be heard. This is then followed by the ABC News announcer Bill Rice reading aloud an e-mail from a viewer. The anchors then respond (sometimes humorously) to the message.
- The National Temperature Index (NTI) – WNN featured the National Temperature Index (NTI), which is the sum of the day's forecast high temperatures for Boston, Massachusetts; Casper, Wyoming; Dallas, Texas; Denver, Colorado; Fargo, North Dakota; Las Vegas, Nevada; Miami, Florida; New Orleans, Louisiana; Raleigh, North Carolina; and Seattle, Washington. The NTI appeared during nightly weather segments until January 6, 2003. It was reintroduced on January 5, 2007, but was dropped again one month later in mid-February. The NTI was originally discontinued when staff meteorologist Gerard McNiff revealed the method used for its calculation to San Francisco Bay Area meteorologist Jan Null, who published the formula in the San Jose Mercury News.
- Leah at the Movies – a movie review segment in which former People magazine film critic Leah Rozen gave her top picks for the week's new feature film releases, along with box office projections.
- Their News Now – a segment in ABC World News Now anchors would check in with news producers at local ABC affiliates around the country each night to see what stories they were working on in their local market, or broadcast the first few minutes of an affiliate's late local newscast during a breaking story (for instance, a blizzard in Buffalo, New York would have the opening of that night's newscast on WKBW-TV shown), or occasionally for a British story pre-BBC America, the opening of that night's BBC News at Ten. This was usually rotated between four or five local markets, which included Seattle and Denver, and was discontinued sometime in 2005 when "American Landscape" was expanded to a nightly segment.
- ABC World News Now "InsomniACTS" – a music performance segment featuring local jazz bands, typically from around the New York City area, that were invited into the studio to play a number on-air.
- World News Knows – featured on some nights, a quick trivial knowledge fact was flashed on-screen following the conclusion of a commercial break.
- WNN also featured a full sportscast, which became a scene of comedic fodder for many anchors on the show since many of them did not have a great deal of experience calling sports highlights. This was later replaced by a scoreboard graphic displaying sports scores coming out of a commercial break, leaving time for more general segments.
- Asia Business Now – a daily segment summarizing overnight business news headlines from Asia, provided by Sumire Sugimoto, an anchor from Japanese broadcaster NHK; this was referenced in the early versions of the "World News Polka" as "business news from Tokyo."
- Financial News from the BBC – a business news segments featuring anchors from the BBC (regularly reported by Declan Curry), presenting an update on the European financial markets from the London Stock Exchange; the BBC presenters typically stood in front of a video wall looking out on a London intersection, and sometimes a small counter at the bottom of the screen would note the number of double-decker bus that passed by in the background.
- World News Then – a presentation of news stories and segments from the ABC News program archives that related to or contrasted with a current event; as a bonus, the feature would also often include one of two television advertisements that aired during the original broadcast.
- Morning Papers – a segment featuring several different off-beat stories or funny pictures found in newspapers around the world; it was replaced in 2012 by "The Mix", which is a more modern version using online stories (some of which may come from a newspaper's website).

== Scheduling ==
The show is produced and airs in two half-hour segments from 2:00 to 3:00 a.m. Eastern Time each Monday through Friday morning, and is transmitted in a continuous 60-minute tape delayed loop until 8:00 a.m. Eastern, when Good Morning America First Look begins in certain areas of the Pacific Time Zone. Good Morning America First Look– which uses the same production and anchor staff as ABC World News Now, although the program is branded as a tie-in to Good Morning America – airs live to the network at 3:30 a.m. Eastern Time and is also tape delayed for many ABC stations. Most ABC stations do not air the entire program loop of WNN and preempt portions of the program in favor of airing locally slotted programming (usually infomercials or syndicated programs) – joining the program in progress anywhere from five minutes to as much as two hours after the start of the newscast – with affiliates looping the show until Good Morning America First Look airs.

Although most ABC stations clear ABC World News Now, a small number of affiliates do not air the program:

- Oklahoma City affiliate KOCO-TV (also owned by Hearst) has aired the program since its debut; however from November 2010 to September 2012, it preempted the Monday edition of the program to air syndicated programming and infomercials – a pre-emption that resulted from the expansion of the station's weekday morning newscast to 4:30 a.m., which resulted in the station pushing America This Morning ahead by a half-hour (prior to November 2010, the station aired a 25-minute block of the Monday edition joined in progress in-between an infomercial and America This Morning). KOCO began airing the full 90-minute block of the Monday edition, when that broadcast rejoined its schedule in September 2012, as it dropped certain syndicated programs and infomercials from its Sunday overnight schedule.
- WAWV in Terre Haute, Indiana (owned by Mission Broadcasting) did not clear ABC World News Now when the station rejoined ABC in September 2011, following a 16-year absence of an over-the-air ABC affiliate in the market (it was an ABC affiliate at the time the program debuted, but operated as a Fox affiliate from 1995 to 2011); WAWV had to fulfill existing syndicated programming contracts instead of carrying WNN at first, which also included the pre-emption of the network's Saturday morning children's program block Litton's Weekend Adventure. In the fall of 2013, WAWV began carrying WNN and LWA with the expiration of those syndication agreements.
- KTWO-TV in Casper, Wyoming and WVII-TV in Bangor, Maine have previously preempted the program in favor of airing a simulcast of the cable home shopping network Jewelry Television. Both channels have since added ABC World News Now, as the Jewelry Television simulcast was dropped.
- Until September 2011, three ABC stations owned by Citadel Communications – KCAU-TV in Sioux City, Iowa, KLKN in Lincoln, Nebraska and WOI-DT in Ames, Iowa (Des Moines, Iowa) – pre-empted ABC World News Now, as they all signed off the air during the overnight hours (as such, the three were among the few television stations remaining in the United States that did not operate on a 24-hour schedule). WLNE-TV in New Bedford, Massachusetts (Providence, Rhode Island), which was acquired by Citadel in April 2011, and prior to September, was the only Citadel-owned ABC affiliate that carried both a 24-hour schedule and cleared ABC World News Now. KCAU and WOI have since been sold to Nexstar Media Group.
- WDAY-TV in Fargo, North Dakota and its satellite WDAZ-TV in Grand Forks, North Dakota chooses to carry paid programming and its local automated weather subchannel overnights instead.
- WOAY-TV in Oak Hill, West Virginia has chosen to run America This Morning in a loop from its original 3:30 a.m. airing, until its local news starts at 6 a.m. The channel now runs the second half of ABC World News Now.
- Over the summer of 2020, network O&Os at first WPVI-TV in Philadelphia, then in late August 2020, New York flagship station WABC-TV dropped ABC World News Now altogether after expanding their weekday late night offerings to include a rebroadcast of Live with Kelly and Ryan along with Daytime Jeopardy!, a rebroadcast of Tamron Hall, and the rebroadcast of World News Tonight. The station replaced the early Monday airing with a rebroadcast of This Week in September 2020 to complete the move. WPVI has since aired only the Monday morning broadcasts along with WTVD, KFSN, and KABC. As of July 2026, KTRK-TV is the only O&O affiliate to air the program.

== Anchors ==
=== Timeline ===
From	To	Anchors
01/1992	01/1993	Aaron Brown and Lisa McRee
01/1993	05/1993	Aaron Brown
05/1993	06/1993	Aaron Brown and Thalia Assuras
06/1993	11/1994	Thalia Assuras and Boyd Matson
11/1994	04/1996	Thalia Assuras and Kevin Newman
04/1996	01/1997	Thalia Assuras and Mark Mullen
01/1997	12/1998	Mark Mullen and Asha Blake
01/1999	02/2000	Juju Chang and Anderson Cooper
02/2000	08/2000	Anderson Cooper and Alison Stewart
08/2000	02/2002	Alison Stewart and Derek McGinty
02/2002	06/2003	Derek McGinty and Liz Cho
07/2003	12/2003	Andrea Stassou and David Muir
12/2003	08/2004	David Muir and Tamala Edwards
08/2004	01/2005	Tamala Edwards and Ron Corning
01/2005	12/2005	Ron Corning and Heather Cabot
12/2005	08/2006	Ron Corning and Tai Hernandez
08/2006	02/2007	Tai Hernandez and Hari Sreenivasan
02/2007	12/2007	Tai Hernandez and Ryan Owens
12/2007	02/2008	Ryan Owens (main); Gigi Stone, Christianne Klein and Tanya Rivero (alternating substitutes)
02/2008	03/2008	Tanya Rivero (main); Gigi Stone and Christianne Klein (alternating substitutes)
03/2008	05/2008	Jeremy Hubbard (main); Gigi Stone, Christianne Klein, and Tanya Rivero (alternating substitutes)
05/2008	07/2010	Jeremy Hubbard and Vinita Nair
07/2010	02/2011	Vinita Nair and Rob Nelson
02/2011	07/2011	Rob Nelson and Peggy Bunker
07/2011	10/2011	Rob Nelson (main); Tanya Rivero, Diana Alvear and Linsey Davis (alternating substitutes)
10/2011	01/2012	Rob Nelson (main); Yunji De Nies, Cecilia Vega and Sunny Hostin (alternating substitutes)
01/2012	01/2013	Rob Nelson and Paula Faris
01/2013	02/2013	Rob Nelson (main); Sunny Hostin, Diana Perez and Brandi Hitt (alternating substitutes)
02/2013	03/2013	Rob Nelson and Diana Perez
03/2013	05/2014	Diana Perez and John Muller (main); Marci Gonzalez, Linzie Janis, Tai Hernandez, Rob Nelson and Rob Powers (substitutes)
05/2014	06/2014	John Muller (main); Linzie Janis, Reena Ninan (substitutes)
06/2014	09/2014	Tahman Bradley, Devin Dwyer, Michelle Franzen, Matt Gutman, Brandi Hitt, Dan Kloeffler, Muhammad Lila, Reena Ninan and Ryan Smith (all substitutes)
10/2014	08/2015	T. J. Holmes and Reena Ninan (main); Michelle Franzen, Tai Hernandez, Kayna Whitworth, Kendis Gibson, Ryan Smith (substitutes)
08/2015	04/2016	Reena Ninan (main); Kendis Gibson, Phillip Mena (substitutes)
04/2016	02/2017	Diane Macedo (main); Kendis Gibson (substitute)
03/2017	11/2018	Diane Macedo and Kendis Gibson (main)
11/2018	12/2018	Kendis Gibson and Janai Norman (main)
12/2018	01/2019	Janai Norman (main); Gio Benitez, Zachary Kiesch, Marcus Moore (substitutes)
01/2019	10/2019	Janai Norman (main); Kenneth Moton (substitute)
10/2019	01/2020	Janai Norman and Kenneth Moton (main)
01/2020	03/2020	Janai Norman (main; maternity leave) and Kenneth Moton (main); Kimberly Brooks, Eva Pilgrim, Zohreen Shah (substitutes)
03/2020	09/2020	Janai Norman (main; maternity leave) and Kenneth Moton (main); Mona Kosar Abdi (substitute)
09/2020	05/2021	Kenneth Moton and Mona Kosar Abdi (main)
05/2021	08/2022	Mona Kosar Abdi and Andrew Dymburt (main)
08/2022	08/2025	Andrew Dymburt and Rhiannon Ally (main)
11/2025	present	Sophie Flay (main)
12/2025	present	Sophie Flay and Hanna Battah (main)

== Criticism ==
Occasional anchor Taina Hernandez has been criticized in the national press for laughing during various segments of the program, some of them dealing with serious stories. She laughed through the story of Owen Wilson's attempted suicide in 2007, and she and co-host Ryan Owens have giggled through segments centering on terrorism and the Iraq War.
