= Vinita Nair =

American television journalist

- Born: Vinita Chandra Nair; Evanston, Illinois, U.S.
- Education: Northwestern University
- Occupation(s): News anchor, news correspondent
- Years active: 2000–present
- Employer(s): NBC News (2018–present); CBS (2013–2016); ABC News (2008–2011)
- Known for: World News Now; America This Morning; CBS This Morning; CBS This Morning Saturday
- Spouse: Osman Nawaz (m. 2009)
- Children: 1 son

Vinita Chandra Nair is an American television journalist and co-founder of a social media branding company. Nair is the former co-host of CBS This Morning Saturday alongside Anthony Mason. She was replaced by Alex Wagner, starting with the episode that aired on November 19, 2016. She has also worked freelance for NBC News.

== Early life and education ==
Nair is of Indian Malayali descent and was born in Evanston, Illinois, and raised in Colleyville, Texas, going to school in Fort Worth. She graduated with a degree in journalism from the Medill School of Journalism, of Northwestern University. She speaks English, Malayalam, and Hindi.

== Career ==
Nair wrote for Today's Chicago Woman magazine and was a reporter for Talk Radio News in Washington D.C. before pursuing television journalism. She began her career in television news at WGEM-TV, the NBC affiliate in Quincy, Illinois, as a general assignment reporter. She also worked for WYCC-TV, Chicago's PBS station, and Illinois' public, educational, and government access (PEG) cable TV station, Evanston Community Cable Channel.

Next, Nair became an anchor and reporter for KOLN/KGIN-TV in Lincoln, Nebraska, where she anchored daily morning and afternoon newscasts. Then, she was lead evening reporter and anchor at KWGN-TV, the CW affiliate in Denver. She started at the station in July 2004 and reported on a wide range of topics, including the Jon Benet Ramsey murder investigation and the school shootings at Bailey, Colorado.

Nair joined ABC News as an anchor/correspondent for ABC News Now in December 2007. In that role, she anchored live coverage and news briefs for ABC's digital network. Nair was co-anchor of World News Now and America This Morning on ABC, from September 17, 2008, until February 18, 2011. She was partnered with Jeremy Hubbard and later Rob Nelson on both shows. On Thursday, February 17, 2011, Nair announced that Friday, February 18, would be her last night on air at World News Now. It would also be her last day with ABC News. Former KDVR Denver anchor Peggy Bunker was her immediate successor. The February 18 edition of World News Now paid tribute to Nair in each of its three segments, including appearances from current and former colleagues including Jeremy Hubbard. She treated the crew to a hot breakfast on her last day. Also, a brief send-off by Nelson to Nair was given at the conclusion of America This Morning.

In 2011, Nair worked at MSNBC in New York, as a newsreader on Martin Bashir and anchoring the early morning news programs Early Today on NBC and First Look on MSNBC.

Vinita was then the former co-anchor of CBS This Morning Saturday alongside Anthony Mason. She was also a correspondent for CBS Newspath and was seen on the network as a substitute anchor for Up to the Minute. An article published in Variety stated that Nair left CBS. On October 12 and 13, 2017, Nair guest anchored on Dallas-based ABC affiliate WFAA on News 8 Daybreak alongside World News Now and America This Morning alum Ron Corning.

== See also ==
- New Yorkers in journalism
- Reena Ninan
