= Tanya Rivero =

American journalist

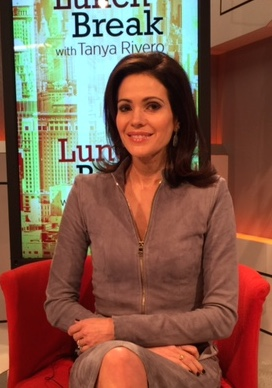
- Tanya Rivero
- Education: Yale University, Columbia Graduate School of Journalism
- Occupation: Journalist

Tanya Rivero has been a news anchor for WABC-TV since July 2024. Previously, she was a news anchor for CBS News from 2017–2024. She was also the host of Lunch Break with Tanya Rivero on Wall Street Journal Live between April 2014 and 2017.

Until August 2013, she was anchor for ABC News Now. Other work for ABC included hosting Good Morning America Health. She has filed reports for has been Good Morning America, Nightline, World News with Diane Sawyer, Weekend World News with David Muir and anchored World News Now and America This Morning.

Before joining ABC News in October 2007, she was a reporter and fill-in anchor for WCBS-TV (CBS 2) in New York City, the flagship station of CBS Television Network. She joined WCBS-TV in July 2005 after working for News 12 The Bronx and News 12 Brooklyn since June 2004. Before joining News 12 Networks, she worked at NY1 News as a newswriter. During college, she worked at ABC News as a desk assistant.

She is a graduate of Yale University and the Columbia Graduate School of Journalism.

== Personal life ==
Rivero grew up in New York where she learned to speak Spanish from her Cuban mother. She attended Manhattan's Professional Children's School and danced professionally with the New York City Ballet under the name Tanya Gingerich. She started using the name Tanya Rivero professionally after attending journalism school. It is her Cuban mother's last name. She is married and has two sons.
