= Diana Perez =

American television reporter and anchor

Diana Perez-Rodgers
- Born: Diana Perez; January 13, 1981 (age 45); Philadelphia, Pennsylvania, U.S.
- Education: Hofstra University (B.S., Broadcast Journalism, 2003)
- Occupation: former Television anchor
- Years active: 2003–2014
- Spouse: Ducis Rodgers (m. 2007)
- Children: 2

Diana Perez-Rodgers (born January 13, 1981) is a former American television reporter who was employed by ABC News as anchor of World News Now and America This Morning.

== Education and career ==
Perez graduated from Hofstra University in 2003 with a bachelor's degree in broadcast journalism. She interned at LI News Tonight at NYIT in 2005. Perez was also a desk assistant and assignment editor for WCBS-2 before appearing on camera. From January 2006 to June 2008 Perez was a morning anchor and reporter at News 12 The Bronx. In June 2008, she joined NBC Connecticut as a fill-in anchor and New Haven Bureau reporter. She held that position until March 4, 2011, when she moved to WBZ in Boston as an anchor and reporter. Perez left WBZ in March 2012.

In May 2012, Perez joined ABC News as a correspondent for NewsOne. She was also an occasionally fill-in co-host for ABC's World News Now and America This Morning beginning May 14, 2012. Perez became permanent co-host of World News Now and America This Morning, alongside Rob Nelson, on February 4, 2013, replacing Paula Faris. On May 30, 2014, she retired from anchoring both programs to be a full-time mother. After considering a return to broadcast journalism, she became a real estate agent in the Philadelphia Main Line suburbs. She founded Radnor RISE (Respect, Inclusion, Solidarity, Equity) and implements DEI programs in Main Line schools. For this work, she was named one of 2022's Power Women of the Year by Main Line Today magazine.

== Personal life ==
Perez was born in Philadelphia and grew up in Queens, New York. She married Ducis Rodgers on July 28, 2007. Their son, Devin Beau, was born on September 24, 2012, weighing 7lbs., 13oz. In January 2014, their second son, Dylan, was born.
