= Golf Films (Golf Channel) =

Franchise of films produced by Golf Channel

Golf Films is a franchise of films produced by Golf Channel, which originated in 1995 as the first U.S. single-sport cable network, co-founded by Arnold Palmer. The biographical features in the Golf Films library cover a wide range of key figures and events that have changed the game in unique ways, in particular over the last century.

== Background ==
Golf Channel is an American pay television network owned by the NBC Sports Group subsidiary of NBCUniversal division of Comcast. The channel focuses on coverage of the sport of golf, including live coverage of tournaments, as well as news and instructional programming.

The Golf Films franchise is a collection of independently produced biographical films that center around key figures and events in the history of golf.

Each Golf Films production is typically released at a time that matches its significance and correlation with a current major championship/event. Recently, “Famous 5” premiered on September 24, 2018, just days before the beginning of the 2018 Ryder Cup in Paris, France, which was aired on NBC and Golf Channel. “Famous 5” focused on a group of five European golfers – all born within 11 months of one another – who helped revitalize the Ryder Cup and redefine the professional golf landscape.

== List of Golf Films ==
"Famous 5"	World Premiere September 24, 2018	Producer Israel DeHerrera	Duration One Hour

“Famous 5” outlines how five European golfers – born within 11 months of one another – helped revitalize the Ryder Cup and redefine the professional golf landscape. The film also details how the five (Seve Ballesteros, Nick Faldo, Bernhard Langer, Sandy Lyle, Ian Woosnam) would go on to World Golf Hall of Fame careers, led by 16-combined major championships and a No. 1 world ranking (all but Lyle).

"Go Down Swinging: The 1999 Open at Carnoustie"	Producers Israel DeHerrera Rich Lerner	Writer Rich Lerner	World Premiere July 9, 2018	Duration One Hour

"Go Down Swinging: The 1999 Open at Carnoustie" recounts the 1999 Open when Jean van de Velde surrendered what seemed like inevitable victory with a three-shot lead on the 72nd hole.

"Summer of '76"	Narrator Tim Matheson	Producers Rich Lerner, Israel DeHerrera James Ponti	Writer Rich Lerner	World Premiere July 18, 2017	Duration One Hour

"Summer of '76"

"Jack"	Narrator Tom Selleck	Producer Israel DeHerrera	World Premiere April 9–11, 2017	Duration Three 1-Hour Installments

"Jack" is a biopic on record 18-time major champion and World Golf Hall of Fame member Jack Nicklaus.

"Countdown to Rio"	World Premiere July 31, 2016	Duration One Hour

"Countdown to Rio" prepared viewers for golf's return to the Olympic Games in 2016 for the first time in 112 years. The special details the sport's journey back to becoming an Olympic sport, including the reaction from the vote in October 2009 that finalized the sport's reinstatement into the Games. The subsequent elements include the events that would follow ahead of the 2016 Rio Olympics, including: The bidding process for designing the Olympic golf course venue and the challenges that the winning architect – Gil Hanse – would face in preparing the course for competition.

"86"	Narrator John Cusack	Producer Israel DeHerrera	World Premiere April 5, 2016	Duration One Hour

"86" is a commemoration of the 30-year anniversary of Jack Nicklaus’ 30th anniversary historic 18th and final major championship in the 1986 Masters.

"Ben Crenshaw: A Walk Through Augusta"	Producer Israel DeHerrera	World Premiere April 13, 2015	Duration One Hour

“Ben Crenshaw: A Walk Through Augusta” serves as a retrospective on the life and career of Ben Crenshaw.

"Arnie & Me"	Producer James Ponti	World Premiere March 17, 2015	Duration One Hour

"Arnie & Me" consists largely of videos recounting random meetings with Palmer. The stories are told by the fans, with no narration.

"Payne"	Narrator Josh Elliott	Producer Peter Franchella	Writers Al Szymanski "Fritz" Mitchell	World Premiere June 8, 2014	Duration One Hour

An Emmy-nominated film commemorating Payne Stewart on the 15th anniversary of his victory in the 1999 U.S. Open.

"Arnie"	Narrator Tom Selleck	Producer Israel DeHerrera	Writer Aaron Cohen	World Premiere April 13–15, 2014	Duration Three 1-Hour Installments

"Arnie" features interviews with more than 100 people, all weighing in on Palmer's contributions to sports and society.

"Lee Trevino: An American Champion"	Narrator Andy Garcia	Producer Israel DeHerrera	Writer Aaron Cohen	World Premiere June 9, 2013	Duration One Hour

"Lee Trevino: An American Champion" recounts Lee Trevino’s playoff victory in the 1971 U.S. Open over Jack Nicklaus, featuring retrospective interviews with both World Golf Hall of Fame members. The film details the impoverished childhood of Trevino, a Mexican-American eighth grade dropout.

"Go Annika"	Producer James Ponti	World Premiere May 22, 2013	Duration 30-Minutes

"Go Annika" commemorates the historic moment when Annika Sorenstam became the first woman in the modern professional golf era to test her mettle amongst the men in the 2003 PGA Tour event at Colonial Country Club. The film details how and why the World Golf Hall of Fame member and best female golfer of her generation came to play in the tournament, revealing the immense pressure she felt and how it changed her outlook on her life and career forever. Longtime golf writer Ron Sirak summed up Annika's foray into men's golf. “She entered the Bank of America Colonial as a female golfer and left it as a golfer,” Sirak wrote. “She entered it as a reluctant superstar and left it as a one-word celebrity.” (3) "Go Annika" also incorporates Sorenstam's return visit to Colonial a decade later, where (to her surprise) she is reunited with her playing partners from 2003 – Aaron Barber and Dean Wilson – for a casual round of golf to reminisce about their experience together inside the ropes.

"American Triumvirate"	Narrator Kurt Russell	Producer Dominic Dastoli	World Premiere August 13, 14, 21 and 28, 2012	Duration Four 1-Hour Installments

"American Triumvirate"

"Uneven Fairways"	Narrator Samuel L. Jackson	Director Dan Levinson	Writer Pete McDaniel	World Premiere February 11, 2009	Duration One Hour

"Uneven Fairways" chronicles the story of the African-American golfers.

== Timing of the Premiere Dates ==
The release date of the productions often coincided with major golf events that were contested at the same time. Some dates relate to other newsworthy events at a particular time. Below is the list of premiere dates and their significance.

Title	Release date	Notes
Uneven Fairways	February 11, 2009	first aired during Black History Month
American Triumvirate	August, 2012	commemorated the 100-year anniversary of each of the film's prominent figures: Ben Hogan, Byron Nelson and Sam Snead
Go Annika	May 13, 2013	aired on the 10th anniversary of Annika Sorenstam being the first woman in golf's modern era to play in a PGA Tour event
Lee Trevino: An American Champion	June 9, 2013	aired as the U.S. Open was returning that year to Merion Golf Club in Pennsylvania, the site of Trevino's first Major championship victory in the 1971 U.S. Open
Arnie	April 13, 2014	aired in conjunction with the Masters, the first Major to be played each season and a tournament whose legendary status grew thanks to the dominance of Arnold Palmer
Payne	June 8, 2014	aired on the 15th anniversary of Payne Stewart's long-awaited victory in the 1999 U.S. Open at Pinehurst
Arnie & Me	March 17, 2015	first aired in conjunction with the playing of the Arnold Palmer Invitational, an annual stop on the PGA Tour at Palmer's adopted home course in Orlando, Florida
Ben Crenshaw: A Walk Through Augusta	April 13, 2015	commemorated the 20th anniversary of Crenshaw's second and final Masters victory and also to mark his final appearance in the Masters field in 2015
86	April 5, 2016	celebrated the 30th anniversary of Jack Nicklaus’ remarkable Masters win, the final of his record 18 Major championships
Countdown to Rio	July 31, 2016	premiered as golf was just days away from returning to the Olympic Games for the first time in nearly a century
Jack	April 9, 2017	three-part biographical production on Jack Nicklaus served as a prelude to the 2017 Masters and was centered around his incredible career which included a record six Green Jackets earned with Masters victories
Summer of '76	July 18, 2017	coincided with the return of the Open to Royal Birkdale in 2017 a look back at professional golf in the 1970s which featured a memorable duel between veteran American golfer Johnny Miller (the eventual winner) and upcoming 19-year-old Spanish star Seve Ballesteros at the 1976 Open Championship at Royal Birkdale, England
Go Down Swinging: The 1999 Open at Carnoustie	July 9, 2018	premiered just ahead of the Open returning to Carnoustie where NBC and Golf Channel would telecast the major championship
Famous Five	Sept 24, 2018	debuted in advance of the Ryder Cup which would air exclusively on NBC and Golf Channel - the film featured five of the top golfers in European golf and the 2018 Ryder Cup was being played in Europe at Le Golf National in Paris, France
