= Marci Gonzalez =

American journalist (born 1982)

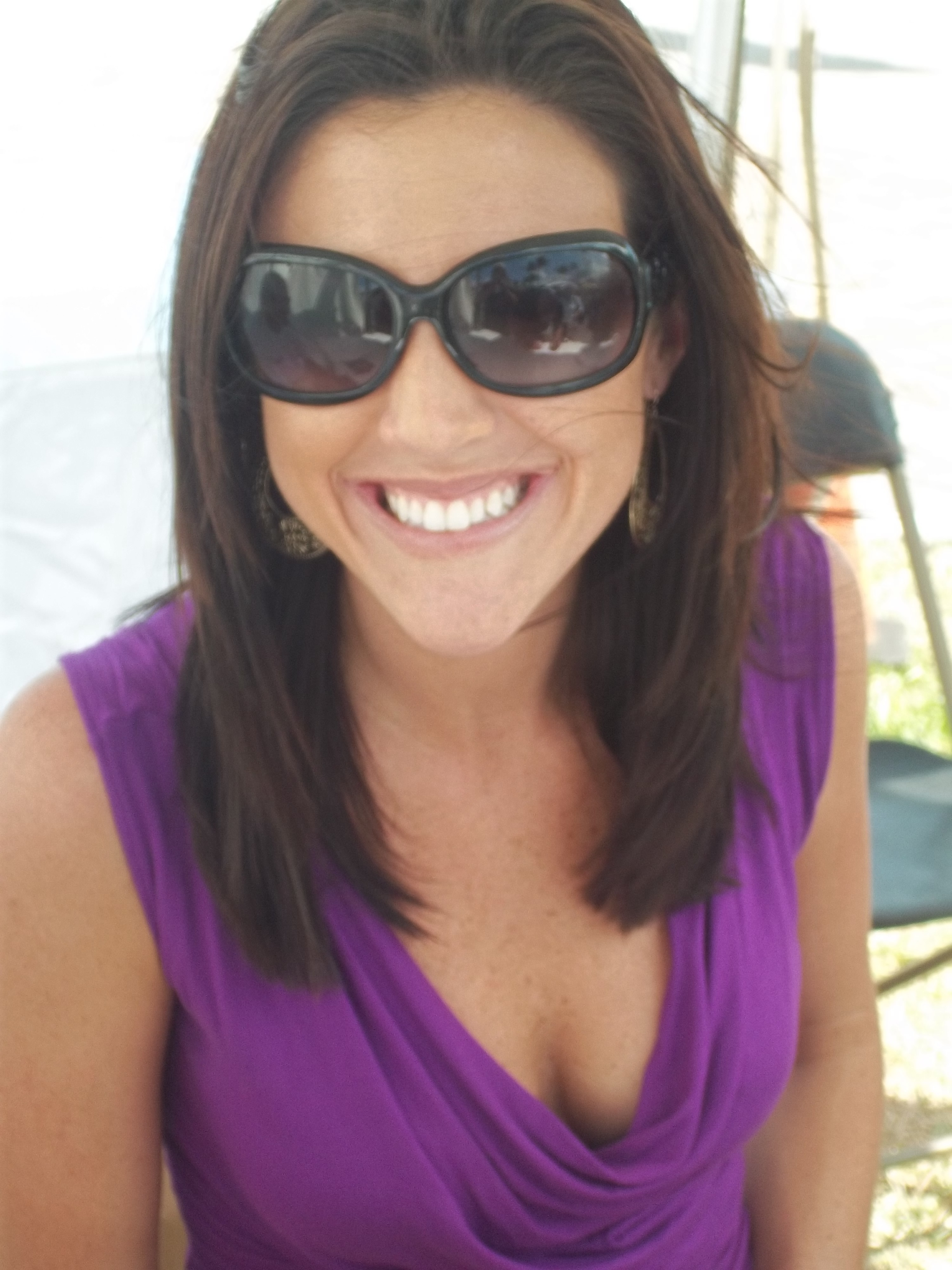
- Marci Gonzalez in 2011
- Born: Marci Renee Gonzalez; November 25, 1982 (age 43); Denville, New Jersey, U.S.
- Education: University of Central Florida
- Years active: 2005–present
- Known for: Television reporter

Marci Renee Gonzalez (born November 25, 1982) is a reporter for CBS News formerly of ABC News who appears on various programs for the CBS network.

== Early life and education ==
Marci Renee Gonzalez was born on November 25, 1982, in Denville, New Jersey to Cathi (née Addeo) and Francisco Gonzalez. Her father immigrated to the United States from Montevideo, Uruguay when he was a teenager. Marci has a younger sister, Christina Isabelle (born March 6, 1985) and a younger brother, Richard Frances (born September 20, 1992).

Gonzalez grew up in Port Orange, Florida and attended Atlantic High School. She went on to graduate from the University of Central Florida in 2005 with a B.A. in political science and journalism.

In May 2020, Marci gave birth to her first child, a son. She has since adopted and given birth to 2 daughters.

== Career ==
In 2005, Gonzalez launched her journalism career at News 12 Networks in The Bronx where she was an anchor and reporter. She returned to Florida to be a reporter and weekend anchor for WPTV-TV in West Palm Beach, Florida. During her time at WPTV-TV Gonzalez covered the devastating 2010 Haiti earthquake and returned for subsequent in-depth reports. Based on those stories and her daily live-skills, WABC-TV in New York City hired Gonzalez as a reporter in 2011. Her national career took off when she joined ABC News in 2013. She now reports and anchors for various programs on the network including Good Morning America, ABC World News Tonight, World News Now and America This Morning. Some of the biggest stories Gonzalez has covered include the 2013 Paris attacks, the final days of Nelson Mandela's life in South Africa, Fidel Castro's death in Cuba and the Boston Marathon bombing.
