= Sophie Flay =

American journalist (c. 1939–2005)

- Born: April 16, 1996 (age 30)
- Education: B.A. University of Southern California
- Occupation: Journalist
- Family: Bobby Flay (father)

Sophie Flay (born April 16, 1996) is an American journalist, television correspondent, and anchor. She serves as co-anchor of World News Now and Good Morning America First Look for ABC News, based in New York.

== Early life and education ==
Flay was born on April 16, 1996, in New York City to celebrity chef Bobby Flay and his ex-wife Kate Connelly. She was raised in Fairfield, Connecticut where she graduated from Fairfield Warde High School. In 2018, she graduated from the University of Southern California with a degree in broadcast and digital journalism. In August 2022, she later returned to USC as an adjunct professor at the Annenberg School for Communication and Journalism, teaching visual journalism.

== Career ==
In March 2019, Flay joined KABC-TV, an ABC affiliate, in Los Angeles as a community journalist and later a general assignment reporter. She covered major Southern California stories including the Monterey Park mass shooting, the raid on Sean “Diddy” Combs’ Los Angeles estate, the Oscars, and the 2025 LA wildfires In October 2025, ABC News named her correspondent and overnight anchor of World News Now and Good Morning America First Look based in New York City.

== Collaborations with Bobby Flay ==
Flay has worked with her father on several Food Network projects including the series The Flay List and Bobby and Sophie on the Coast, the podcast Always Hungry, and the 2022 cookbook Sundays with Sophie: Flay Family Recipes for Any Day of the Week.
