= Daughters of Abraham =

Interfaith women's book group

The Daughters of Abraham is an interfaith book group that consists of Jewish, Christian, and Muslim women. Its mission is to overcome stereotypes and to foster mutual respect and understanding among Jewish, Christian, and Muslim women.

The first group was founded in Cambridge, Massachusetts, United States, in 2002. Groups then formed in Cambridge, Newton, Massachusetts, Chestnut Hill, Massachusetts (at Boston College), and Washington, DC.

== Mission ==
The purpose is to increase respect for all of the Abrahamic religions by reading books that teach about faith traditions and the practice of the respective faiths. The group members are committed to building relationships with each other. Daughters of Abraham is not a dialogue group, but a book group focused on discussions of books that explore the three faith traditions.

== Membership ==
Any Jewish, Christian or Muslim woman who shares the Daughters' purpose can join.

== Founding ==
The Daughters of Abraham was the inspiration of Edie Howe. She attended an interfaith service on the evening of September 11, 2001 and sat with Jewish, Christian and Muslim women. Looking around, she wondered what she could do to respond to the tragic events of that day. She decided to form a book group of women from the three Abrahamic faiths. This first group has been meeting since September 2002.

== Meaning of name ==
In all three of the religious traditions, Abraham is revered as the first monotheist. In this sense, he is the "father" and the members can be thought of as his "daughters." Even though they are "daughters" of different "mothers," Sarah and Hagar, Abraham is the father of all three religions. By naming themselves Abraham's daughters, the group members are saying that there is more holding them together than separating them.

== Meetings ==
Group members listen and speak respectfully to one another, do not monopolize the conversation, and speak from personal experience rather than making sweeping statements.

Members suggest books at the meetings. Periodically, they review all the suggestions, then by consensus, choose the books that will be read. If anyone strongly objects to reading a particular book, it is not read.

== Media coverage of the Daughters of Abraham ==
- Christian Science Monitor (November 2005)
- ABC News Now "Top Priority" (December 2005)
- PBS Religion & Ethics Newsweekly (October 2006)
- Boston Globe (October 2006)
- Boston College Magazine (Spring 2007)
