= Ryan Owens =

American journalist

- Born: United States
- Education: Illinois State University (1995)
- Occupation: Journalist
- Notable credit(s): • Anchor, WHDH, Boston, Massachusetts, United States (2001–2006) • Co-Anchor, World News Now (2007–2008)

Ryan Owens (born 1974) is an American journalist serving as a correspondent for ABC News, the news division of the American broadcast-television network ABC. He is the former anchor of World News Now.

== Early life ==
He graduated from Northwestern University in Evanston, Illinois, in 1995.

== Career ==
From 1998 to 2001, Owens worked with WLWT, an NBC network affiliate in Cincinnati, Ohio, as well as stations in Chattanooga, Tennessee, and Evansville, Indiana.

From 2001 to 2006, he was a reporter and anchor at WHDH, an NBC-network affiliate in Boston, Massachusetts. During that time he reported on the 2005 child sexual-abuse trial (acquittal) of Michael Jackson; the 2002 Winter Olympics; the 2004 funeral of U.S. President Ronald Reagan; the Scott Peterson trial (conviction); and some Academy Awards ceremonies.

=== ABC News ===
Owens joined ABC News in August 2006 as an anchor and correspondent for ABC News Now, the network's twenty-four-hour news-and-information digital channel.

For most of 2007, he co-anchored — with Taina Hernandez — World News Now, ABC News' overnight news program. (He also occasionally anchored America This Morning, a 30-minute ABC News early-morning news program.) During his time on World News Now. Owens was involved in controversy when the two anchors inappropriately made light of Owen Wilson's suicide attempt on-air and they were reprimanded for this by ABC News. His departure from World News Now was announced during the program's February 29, 2008, broadcast indicating he had taken a job as a network correspondent.

His first on-air appearance in this new role was on March 10, 2008, covering the Ohio snow storms. He also occasionally anchored the World News Webcast podcast for ABC News at its homepage.

On October 20, 2008, Owens was named ABC News' Dallas, Texas, correspondent.

In May 2013, Owens interviewed Jodi Arias after she was found guilty by the jury.

== Awards ==
Owens won a regional Emmy Award for coverage of special events and spot news reporting.
