= Ducis =

Ducis may refer to:

- The genitive case of dux, the Latin word "leader" and for the title of "duke"
- Collingbourne Ducis, a small village in the English countryside
- The Duke University Center for International Studies

People:

- Jean-François Ducis (1733-1816), French dramatist
- Louis Ducis (1775-1847), French painter
- Ducis Rodgers (b. 1973), American sportscaster on WPVI-TV in Philadelphia
