= Andrew Dymburt =

American media personality

- Education: University of Miami
- Occupation: Media personality
- Years active: 2013–present

Andrew Dymburt is an online co-anchor and on-air correspondent of ABC News' overnight program World News Now and its early morning program Good Morning America First Look along with Good Morning America, Nightline, and ABC News Live.

Dymburt grew up in Coral Springs, Florida, and graduated from Marjory Stoneman Douglas High School, in Parkland, Florida. After graduating from the University of Miami with a bachelor's degree in communications, he worked as a host and reporter for Yahoo's Buzz:60 and reported for USA Today, before joining the New York-based News 12 Networks as a reporter on The Bronx and Brooklyn, New York. Then followed a stint at KOIN in Portland, Oregon, in the mid-2010s. He moved to WSVN in Miami and Fort Lauderdale, Florida, in 2018.

Dymburt joined ABC News in 2020, starting as a multiplatform reporter based in Washington, D.C. He was then promoted to a New York-based correspondent. During that time, he covered the January 6 United States Capitol attack, which led to the network winning an Edward R. Murrow Award a year later for its notable coverage of the riot.

In 2021, Dymburt was promoted to co-anchor of World News Now and Good Morning America First Look (formerly America This Morning), with Rhiannon Ally joining him in 2022.
