= Liz Cho =

American news anchor

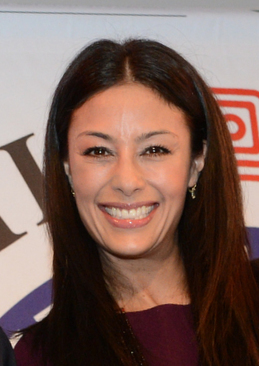
- Cho in 2013
- Education: Boston University
- Occupation: Journalist
- Notable credit(s): Evening Anchor for WABC-TV (2003-present) (with David Novarro, "First at 4:00pm") and anchoring at 6:00pm newscast); AM anchor for (World News Now) (2002-2003)
- Spouse(s): Evan Gottlieb (div.) Josh Elliott (m. 2015; sep. 2025)
- Children: 1

Liz Cho is a news anchor at WABC-TV in New York City. She has co-anchored the weekday 4 p.m. edition with David Novarro and anchoring 6 p.m. edition of Eyewitness News.

== Early life and education ==
Cho grew up in Concord, Massachusetts, and has a younger brother, Andrew. She was born to Sang In Cho, a Korean American surgeon, and a Jewish-American nurse, Donna Cho (née Weltman). Her father, born and raised in South Korea, immigrated to the United States to practice medicine and was a liver and kidney transplant surgeon who headed the team that did the first liver transplant in Boston. He died from colon cancer on March 13, 2009. Liz Cho attended Boston University, majoring in journalism and history.

== Career ==
Her first professional work in journalism was as an assignment editor at New England Cable News in Newton, Massachusetts. Cho was next a reporter at WPLG in Miami, Florida before moving to ABC News as a Chicago-based correspondent for ABC NewsOne, the network's affiliate news service. She later co-anchored ABC's overnight news program, World News Now, with Derek McGinty. During this time, she also served as a correspondent and fill-in anchor for Good Morning America.

Cho started at WABC-TV on July 7, 2003, replacing Diana Williams at 6 p.m. and 11 p.m. In 2011, Cho began anchoring the station's new "First at 4:00" newscast, with David Novarro, filling the hour left vacant by the departure of The Oprah Winfrey Show. In addition, from 2012-2026, she continued to anchor the 6 p.m. broadcasts with Bill Ritter.

== Personal life ==
She and husband Evan Gottlieb had daughter Louisa Simone Gottlieb on May 17, 2007, in New York City.

Cho filed for divorce from Gottlieb in 2012. In August 2014, Cho became engaged to journalist Josh Elliott. On July 11, 2015, she married Elliott in Montecito, California.On June 20, 2025, Elliott filed for divorce from Cho after 10 years of marriage.

== See also ==
- Broadcast journalism
- Korean Americans in New York City
- New Yorkers in journalism
