= Lisa McRee =

American television journalist and news anchor

Lisa McRee (born November 9, 1961) is an American television journalist and news anchor, of the Emmy Award Winning LA TIMES TODAY. Born in Fort Worth, Texas. She is a former co-anchor of Good Morning America.

== Career ==
She was a news anchor and reporter for KERO-TV in Bakersfield, California and WFAA-TV in Dallas, Texas, before becoming one of the original anchors, along with Aaron Brown, of ABC News' World News Now when the show launched in January 1992. McRee left the show in January 1993 to serve as a reporter for the ABC news magazine program Day One, although that stint was short-lived, and subsequently as a host for Good Morning America Sunday, and an anchor and correspondent for Lifetime Magazine.

She then moved to Los Angeles, California, in 1994 to work as an anchor and reporter for KABC-TV.

In 1997, she was hired to replace Joan Lunden as co-anchor of Good Morning America. She then was paired with Kevin Newman after Charles Gibson left the show in 1998. However, Good Morning America, which had been struggling in the ratings, continued to perform poorly. Both she and Newman were replaced in 1999 and reassigned to other duties within ABC News.

From 2004 to 2007, McRee was a host and correspondent for California Connected, a TV news magazine that aired on 12 PBS stations in California. During McRee's tenure, ratings improved 43% in her last year. The program was canceled due to a lack of funding.

In February 2017, McRee began filling-in as the co-anchor of Good Day L.A. on KTTV, the Fox owned-and-operated television station in Los Angeles.

In November 2018, McRee became a news anchor for the recently created Spectrum News 1 Network, co-anchoring the morning show and anchoring the evening show, LA TIMES TODAY, a co-production of The Los Angeles Times and Spectrum News 1.

She is a winner of multiple Emmy Awards, the 2007 Alfred I. duPont-Columbia Journalism Award for reporting and producing California Connected: War Stories from Ward 7-D.

In, 2021 McRee won the Los Angeles Press Club's award for Television Journalist of the Year.

== Filmography ==
Year	Title	Role
2015	Terminator Genisys	Chat Show Host

Preceded by Charles Gibson and Joan Lunden 1987-1997	Good Morning America co-anchor September 8, 1997–January 15, 1999 with Charles Gibson from 1997 to 1998 and with Kevin Newman from 1998 to 1999	Succeeded by Charles Gibson and Diane Sawyer 1999-2005
