= Rhiannon Ally =

American media personality

- Education: University of Missouri-Kansas City
- Occupation: Media personality
- Years active: 2012–present

Rhiannon Ally is an American media personality serving as co-anchor of ABC News' World News Now and Good Morning America First Look and a rotating host on GMA3 and is also a correspondent for the network.

Ally was born on November 27, 1980, and she grew up in Kansas City, Missouri. Ally was previously a weekday evening co-anchor for KSHB in Kansas City, and morning and afternoon co-anchor at WFOR in Miami, Florida.

She joined ABC News in 2021, starting as a correspondent before being promoted to co-anchor with Andrew Dymburt on World News Now and Good Morning America First Look in 2022.
