= Kendis Gibson =

Belizean-American journalist

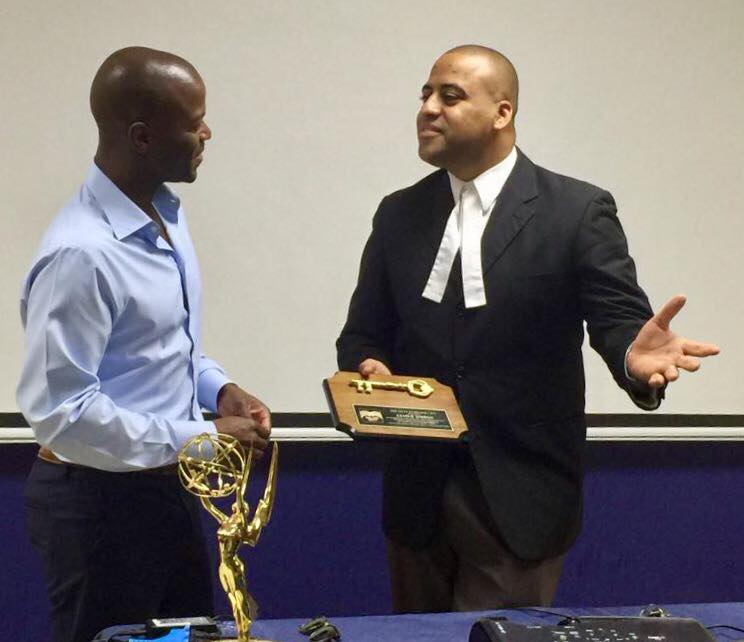
- Kendis Gibson (left) in 2017 receiving the keys to Belize City from Mayor Darrell Bradley
- Born: September 6, 1972 (age 53); Belize City, Belize
- Education: State University of New York at Oswego (BA)
- Occupation: Journalist

Kendis Gibson (born September 6, 1972) is a Belizean-born American journalist. He has won two Emmy Awards for "outstanding news reporting" and "sports feature". He has been an anchor and correspondent for CNN, CBS News, ABC News, and WFOR-TV and a reporter for MSNBC. Gibson also anchored World News Now and America This Morning. He has reported on topics including the 2000 Concorde plane crash, the September 11 attacks, the Academy Awards, and the Grammy Awards. He is a member of the National Association of Black Journalists.

== Early life and education ==
Gibson was born in Belize City, the youngest of seven boys, to Alrick Gibson, a cabinetmaker, and his wife Hortense Gibson. The family moved to New York City in the 1980s when Gibson was 12. He graduated from John Jay High School (now the John Jay Educational Campus) in the Park Slope neighborhood of Brooklyn in New York City, then from State University of New York at Oswego, where he received a Bachelor of Arts in Political Science.

== Career ==
Gibson started his career at the NBC station in Rochester, New York. After spending three years reporting there, he moved to WTXF in Philadelphia as the morning anchor and reporter. He won two Emmy Awards for "outstanding news reporting" and "sports feature". He returned to New York City to be a lead reporter for WNBC NewsChannel. At NBC, he reported on stories including the 2000 Concorde plane crash and 9/11. With his home just blocks from the World Trade Center, he was one of the first reporters on the scene on 9/11. Gibson joined CNN and CNN Headline News in January 2002 as an entertainment anchor and occasional news anchor seen nationally. During his three years there, Gibson attended several red carpet events, including the Academy Awards and the Grammy Awards. Gibson has also spent time in the hosting world with HGTV's I Want That! and as an evening news anchor for KSWB-TV news in San Diego, California. In June 2010, he joined CBS News in Los Angeles as West Coast correspondent for CBS Newspath. Gibson also served as an entertainment correspondent for the network's affiliate service, covering stories including Mel Gibson's 2011 no contest plea to misdemeanor battery charges. Gibson left Southern California to join WJLA, the ABC affiliate for Washington, D.C. area, in October 2011.

In December 2013, Gibson left WJLA-TV to join ABC News as a correspondent. He was also co-anchor for World News Now and America This Morning until moving to NBC News in January 2019, where he became a weekend anchor on MSNBC Live. On January 18, 2022, Gibson joined CBS Miami as a morning news co-anchor alongside Marybel Rodriguez. On January 25, Gibson and Rodriguez began hosting CBS News Miami's streaming service. By October 2022, he was no longer listed as part of the CBS4 team on their website.

In February 2024, Kendis Gibson was hired by WPIX in New York as co-anchor of its 4pm and 5pm evening newscasts, alongside Arrianee LeBeau.

In November 2024, Gibson revealed that he suffered from severe depression and attempted suicide due to racism and bullying he experienced while working at ABC News.

Gibson wrote a memoir, Five Trips: An Investigative Journey into Mental Health, Psychedelic Healing, and Saving a Life, about his use of psychedelics to combat depression.
