= Barry Mitchell (comedian) =

American comedian

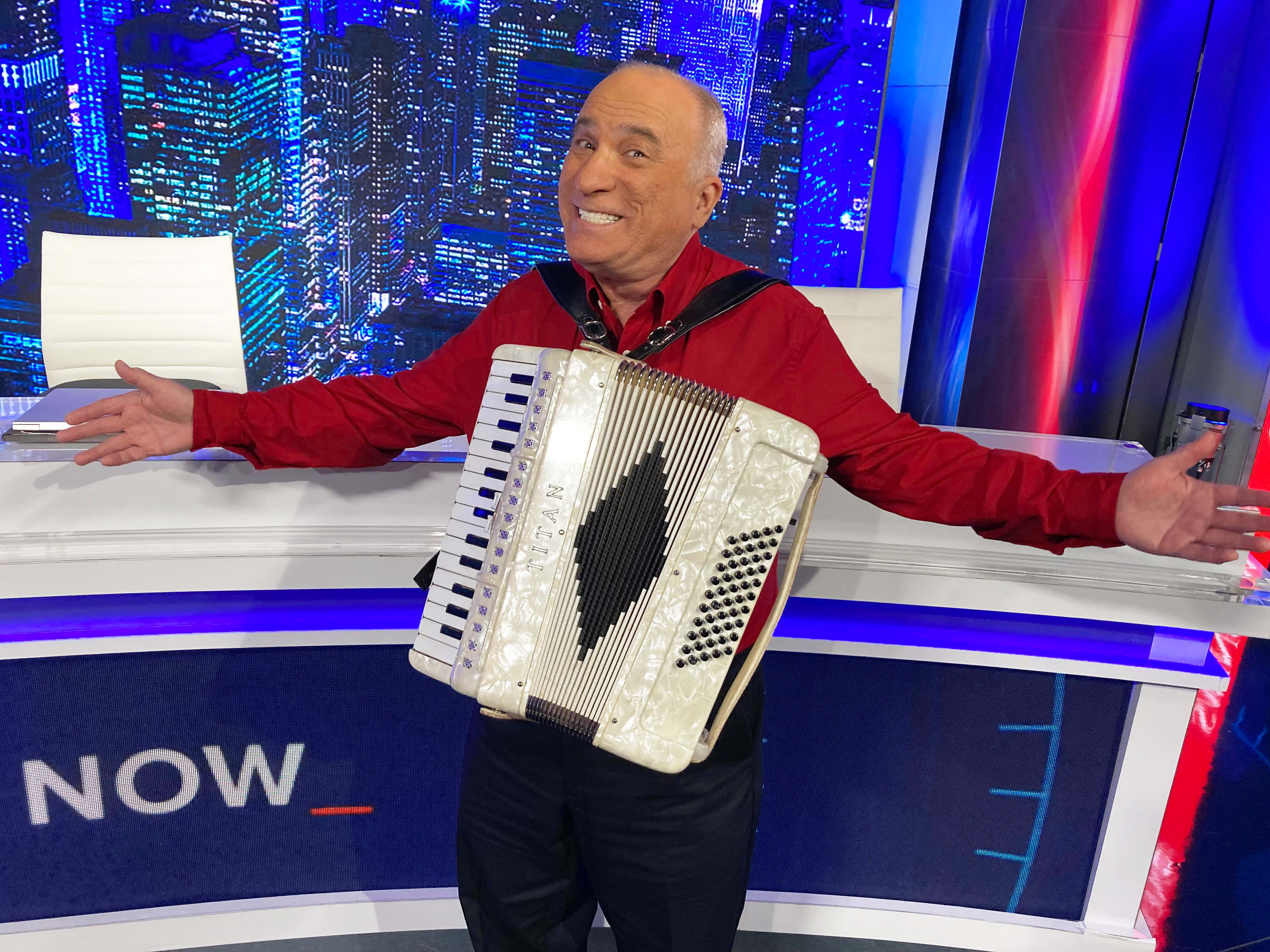
- At ABC World News Now Anchor Desk
- Born: March 6, 1952 (age 73); Brooklyn, New York
- Occupations: musician, comedian
- Known for: Wrote the World News Polka

Barry Mitchell (born March 6, 1952) is a Brooklyn-born comedian, musician and TV producer. Mitchell is also known as "Accordion Guy" to viewers of ABC-TV's quirky, overnight broadcast, World News Now. He started contributing topical song parodies to the program in 1992, and later became its roving feature reporter, conducting celebrity interviews and scouring the country for oddball stories and personalities. In August, 2021, he was named one of “The 25 Most Impactful People In Late Night TV History” by Primetimer.com.

Mitchell played accordion in Long Island, NY wedding bands in the mid-1970s, and later worked as a radio newswriter for WHLI-AM. In the late 1970s he worked briefly for NBC Radio News and Information Service in Rockefeller Center before starting to earn a living as a stand-up comedian.

In 1992, Mitchell wrote and performed what was to become World News Now's signature closing theme, the tongue-in-cheek "World News Polka". Many different versions of the Polka were created over the years, the most famous being the music video in which Mitchell was accompanied by two attractive female singers dressed in journalistic trenchcoats, who sang backup while waving large hand microphones, with many in-jokes acknowledging Disney's ownership of ABC. Other versions of Mitchell's Polka include one featuring an Elvis impersonator, another with an all-ukulele band, and one starring a water-harpist. In June 2015, Kermit the Frog of The Muppets sang a memorable Polka duet with Mitchell on accordion and Kermit on banjo: "I hear they watch us in the Swamp and think that we're all right/Well, it sure beats croaking in the middle of the night."

In the 1980s, Mitchell's uncanny impression of Woody Allen earned him parts in TV commercials and sketch work on Saturday Night Live and Late Night with Conan O'Brien. In between, he has written monologue material for The Tonight Show with Jay Leno and Wayne Cotter of Fox's Comic Strip Live. In 2004, he was part of the writing team for That Was The Week That Was, ABC's short-lived attempt to revive the 1963 BBC satire series as a segment of Primetime Live.

Since May, 2005, Mitchell has worked as a producer/reporter for CUNY-TV, the public affairs cable channel of the City University of New York, available in the five boroughs of New York City on Channel 75 and online at tv.cuny.edu. He won a New York Emmy Award there, in 2012. Since June, 2019, Mitchell has served as a segment producer and the host of CUNY-TV's monthly magazine program, "Simply Science".
