= Mona Kosar Abdi =

American multimedia journalist

- Born: May 13, 1991 (age 35); San Diego, California, U.S.
- Education: University of California, San Diego (BA)
- Occupation: Journalist
- Years active: 2012–present

Mona Kosar Abdi (born May 13, 1991) is an American multimedia journalist. She graduated from the University of California, San Diego where she earned a BA in international studies, political science, and communications.

In January 2019, she joined ABC News and in 2020 became anchor for World News Now.

== Early life and career ==
Abdi is of Somali descent. She began her journalism career at KGTV Channel 10, an ABC-affiliated television station based in San Diego. She started as an assignment editor and was promoted to an associate producer news writer.

Abdi was a contributing writer at the Al Jazeera Media Network in 2013.

She moved to Lynchburg, Virginia, in January 2014 and joined WSET ABC 13, the ABC television network affiliate for the Roanoke/Lynchburg, Virginia, market. She was a reporter.

In January 2017, she moved to Cleveland, Ohio, where she was an anchor/reporter on ABC affiliate WEWS Channel 5.

Since January 2019, she has been a correspondent for ABC News based in New York.

Abdi anchors the overnight/early morning World News Now and America This Morning with Kenneth Moton. She was officially hired to replace Janai Norman, who began working as a Good Morning America correspondent, in September 2020. On August 22, 2022, Abdi announced her departure from World News Now and became a correspondent for World News Tonight.
