= David Novarro =

American journalist

David Novarro is an American television news journalist for WABC-TV in New York City. He is the co-anchor of Eyewitness News @ Noon with Sandra Bookman and the 4 pm newscast with Liz Cho. He is featured on a segment called The Trend on the 4 pm newscast.

Novarro returned to WABC-TV in December 2010, he was previously the anchor of Good Day Chicago at WFLD-TV in Chicago.

Novarro anchored the "Ten" newscast at Fox Chicago from 2007 to 2009. He was selected to spearhead the station's expansion into the 10:00 pm time slot after anchoring "Fox News in the Morning"

Novarro and his co-anchor Tamron Hall hosted the morning broadcast for seven years beginning in 2000. David Novarro was recruited to Fox Chicago from WABC-TV in New York where he was the morning weekend anchor and general assignment reporter.

The documentary Cropsey is based on a real life serial killer which was the subject of exclusive reports Novarro first broke on Eyewitness News.

He graduated from New York University. His producer credits include the Morning Show with Regis Philbin at WABC-TV, Two on the Town with Leeza Gibbons and Rob Weller, and a music video show, Hot.

== See also ==
- New Yorkers in journalism
- Puerto Rican migration to New York City
