= Jeremy Hubbard =

American TV news anchor

Jeremy David Hubbard (born August 19, 1972, in Glenwood Springs, Colorado) is an American news anchor for KDVR-TV and KWGN-TV in Denver. He was a New York-based correspondent for ABC News, and reported for all ABC News broadcasts and platforms, including Good Morning America, World News with Diane Sawyer, and Nightline.

== Education ==
Hubbard grew up in western Colorado and moved to Utah and Garden City, Kansas, before graduating from high school in Newton, Kansas, in 1991. He graduated from Wichita State University in 1996. .

== Career ==
Prior to his assignment at the anchor desk, Hubbard was a Chicago-based correspondent for NewsOne, the affiliate news service of ABC News. NewsOne provides live and packaged news reports for more than 200 affiliates and clients in the U.S. and around the world.

Hubbard joined the network in spring 2007 and has reported on politics, the economy, severe weather and breaking news. Most recently, he covered several national stories for NewsOne, including the deadly campus shootings at Northern Illinois University, and last month's string of tornadoes that ravaged the southern U.S.

Before joining ABC News, Hubbard was a reporter and anchor at KDVR-TV in Denver, where he covered the battle over illegal immigration. He traveled to the Mexican border, documenting the efforts of the controversial Minuteman Project to keep illegal immigrants from entering the U.S. Hubbard wrote, produced, and reported Battle for the Border, an award-winning documentary on the issue.

From 1998 to 2004, Hubbard worked at KMBC-TV in Kansas City, where he covered several high-profile national stories. He reported from Texas after the Space Shuttle Columbia disaster, and traveled to Terre Haute, Indiana, for the execution of convicted Oklahoma City bomber Timothy McVeigh. Hubbard co-produced, co-wrote and anchored Eye for an Eye, an award-winning documentary about McVeigh's execution.

From March 2008 to July 2010, Jeremy Hubbard was co-anchor of ABC's early morning news programs, World News Now and America This Morning, with Vinita Nair.

Hubbard left ABC News May 20, 2011, and returned to KDVR-TV and its sister station KWGN-TV as a news anchor.

== Honors and awards ==
Hubbard has been recognized with several honors for his reporting, including a national Edward R. Murrow and the national Sigma Delta Chi Award from the Society of Professional Journalists. He won three regional Edward R. Murrow Awards and regional Emmy Awards for both reporting and anchoring.

== Personal life ==
He is married to his wife Taunia Hottman-Hubbard on September 30, 2001. He is the father of two kids a son, Charlie (born October 7, 2010), and a daughter, Bunny (born February 19, 2013). He has a dog named Teddy.
