= Hari Sreenivasan =

American television journalist

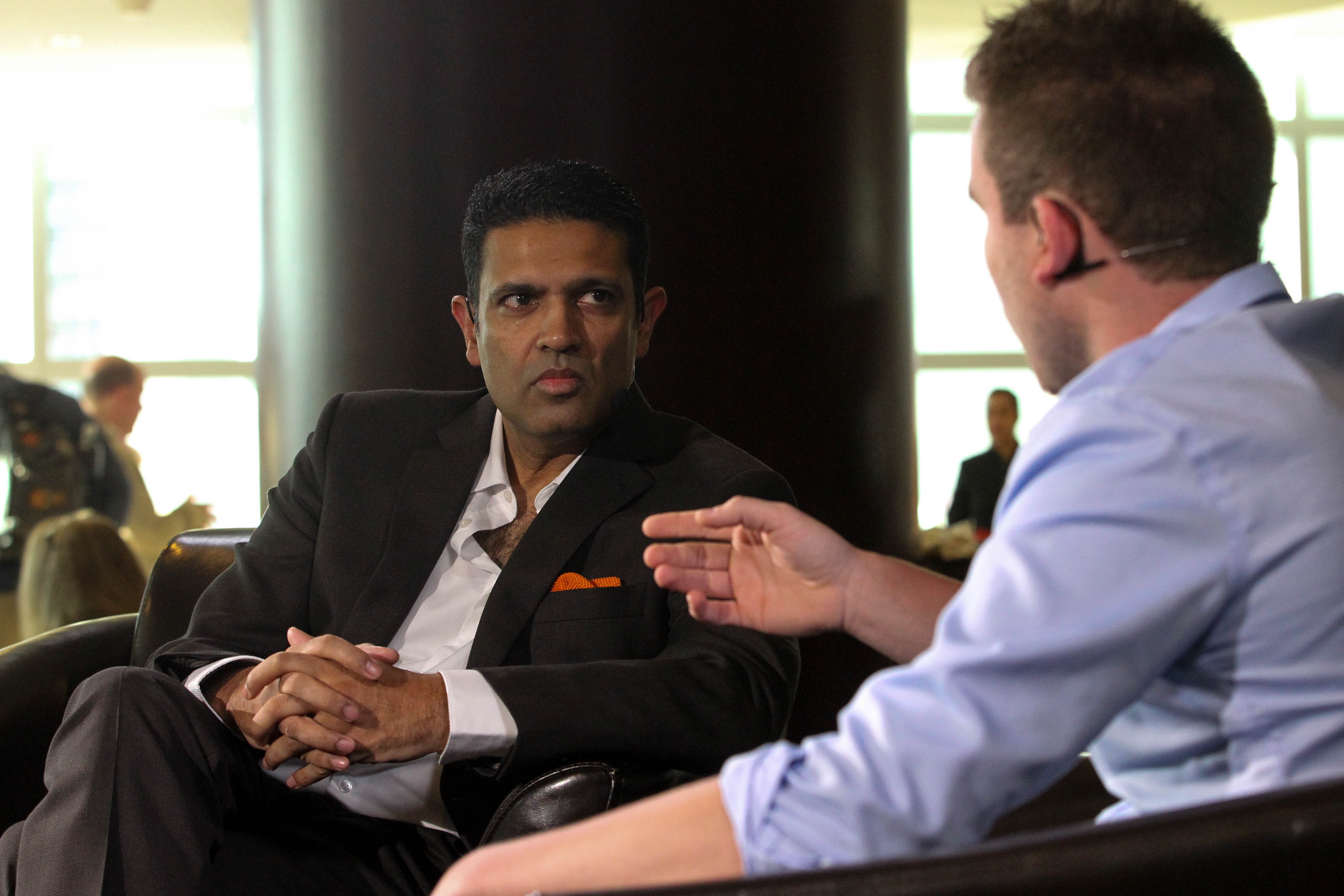
- Sreenivasan during an interview (2019).
- Born: Hariharan Sreenivasan; 1974 (age 51–52); Mumbai, India
- Education: University of Puget Sound (BA)
- Occupation: Television journalist
- Employers: WNCN-TV (1995-?); CNET; ABC News (2004-2009); CBS News &; WCBS-TV (2009-2013); PBS NewsHour Weekend (2013-2022)

Hariharan Sreenivasan (born 1974) is an American broadcast journalist.

== Biography ==
Sreenivasan was born in Mumbai, India, into a Tamil family, around 1974. After immigrating to the United States at age seven, he attended Nathan Hale High School in Seattle, Washington. where he became a radio disc jockey. While earning his degree in 1995 in mass communication (with minors in politics and philosophy) at University of Puget Sound, he interned for several TV news stations in the state of Washington. In September 2008, Sreenivasan became a U.S. citizen.

He was hired full-time in 1995 by then-NBC affiliate WNCN-TV in Raleigh, North Carolina, and later moved to San Francisco, California, to work for CNET, covering the high tech sector. In 2004, Sreenivasan joined ABC News in New York City as a correspondent, he became co-anchor, with Taina Hernandez, of World News Now, and concurrently co-hosted, with Jake Tapper, the behind-the-scenes podcast ABC News Shuffle. In early 2009, he worked as a correspondent for CBS News' Dallas bureau.

Late in 2009, he became an "online/on-air correspondent" for The NewsHour with Jim Lehrer, delivering the television broadcast's news-summary and end-of-the-hour recap and leading the show's blog. In 2013, Sreenivasan became the anchor for the PBS NewsHour Weekend made at the Tisch WNET Studios at Lincoln Center in Manhattan. He regularly replaced the late correspondent Gwen Ifill and stands in for Judy Woodruff when she is away or on assignment.

Miss America 2014 Nina Davuluri and Sreenivasan hosted a talk given by Narendra Modi, the Prime Minister of India, on September 28, 2014, at Madison Square Garden in Midtown Manhattan, in front of an audience of over 18,000. This was Modi's first visit to the United States since he had been denied a visa in 2005.

== Other PBS projects ==
Sreenivasan also anchors SciTech Now, a science program produced by WLIW 21, a WNET sister station and PBS affiliate on Long Island. He is also a correspondent for Amanpour & Company, based out of the WNET studios in Manhattan.

== See also ==
- Indians in the New York City metropolitan region
- New Yorkers in journalism
- PBS NewsHour
