= Ducis Rodgers =

American sportscaster

Ducis Rodgers is an American sportscaster for WPVI-TV in Philadelphia.

Prior to joining the Action News sports team in 2012, Rogers worked at WCBS-TV as a sports director from 2003 to 2009. He also worked at ESPN as a host for Sportscenter and Outside The Lines.

Rodgers graduated from Columbia College Chicago with a degree in broadcast journalism.

He is married to retired television reporter Diana Perez.
