= Josh Elliott =

American television journalist

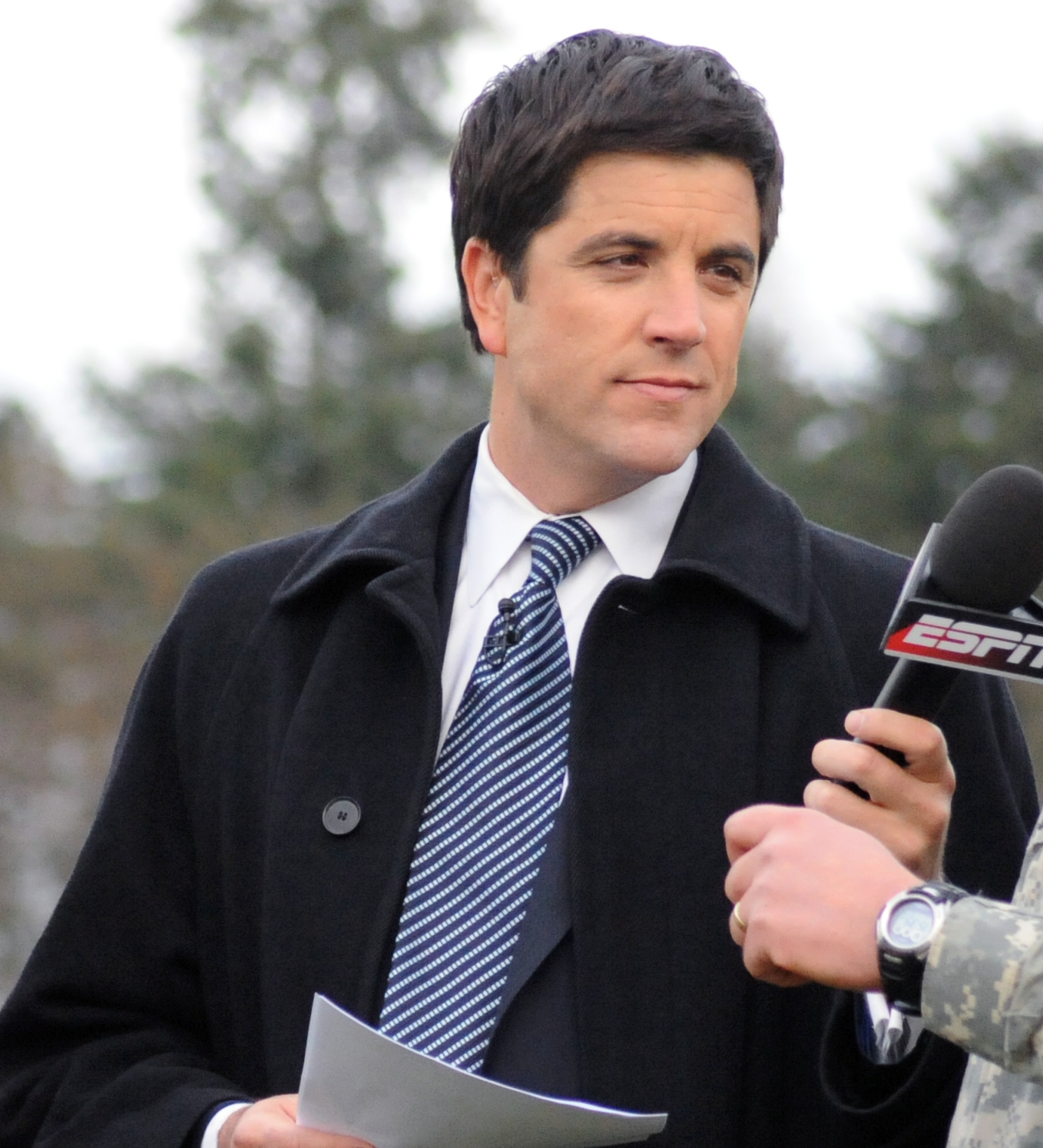
- Elliott for ESPN in Grafenwöhr, Germany on November 11, 2010
- Born: 1971 (age 54–55); Los Angeles, California, U.S.
- Education: University of California, Santa Barbara (BA); Columbia University (MS)
- Occupations: Sportscaster and news anchor
- Height: 6 ft 3 in (191 cm)
- Spouses: Priya Narang (div. 2010); Liz Cho (m. 2015; sep. 2025)
- Children: 1

Josh Elliott (born 1971) is an American television journalist who most recently worked for CBS News. He has previously worked as the news anchor for ABC's Good Morning America, a sports anchor for NBC Sports and Today, and was a co-anchor for the live telecast of ESPN's morning edition of SportsCenter.

== Early life and education ==
Elliott was born to Susan, who gave Elliott up for adoption. He was adopted by Charles Elliott and Toni Jordan and grew up in Los Angeles, California. When he was 13, his father came out as gay at the time of his parents' divorce. His father died when Elliott was 15.

After graduating from Loyola High School of Los Angeles, Elliott attended the University of California, Santa Barbara. He originally enrolled at UC Santa Barbara in hopes of joining the UC Santa Barbara Gauchos men's water polo team, but instead ended up working at the university paper, The Daily Nexus. He graduated from UCSB in 1993 with a B.A. degree in English literature.

Elliot worked as a stringer for the Santa Barbara News-Press. He then moved on to graduate school at Columbia University's Graduate School of Journalism, where he earned a Master of Science degree in 1999. He worked in television as a producer for Galaxy Productions before moving onto 20th Century Fox. He began there in development and later worked in production. After graduating from Columbia, Elliott worked for Sports Illustrated for six years, covering events in most major sports.

== Career ==
=== ESPN ===
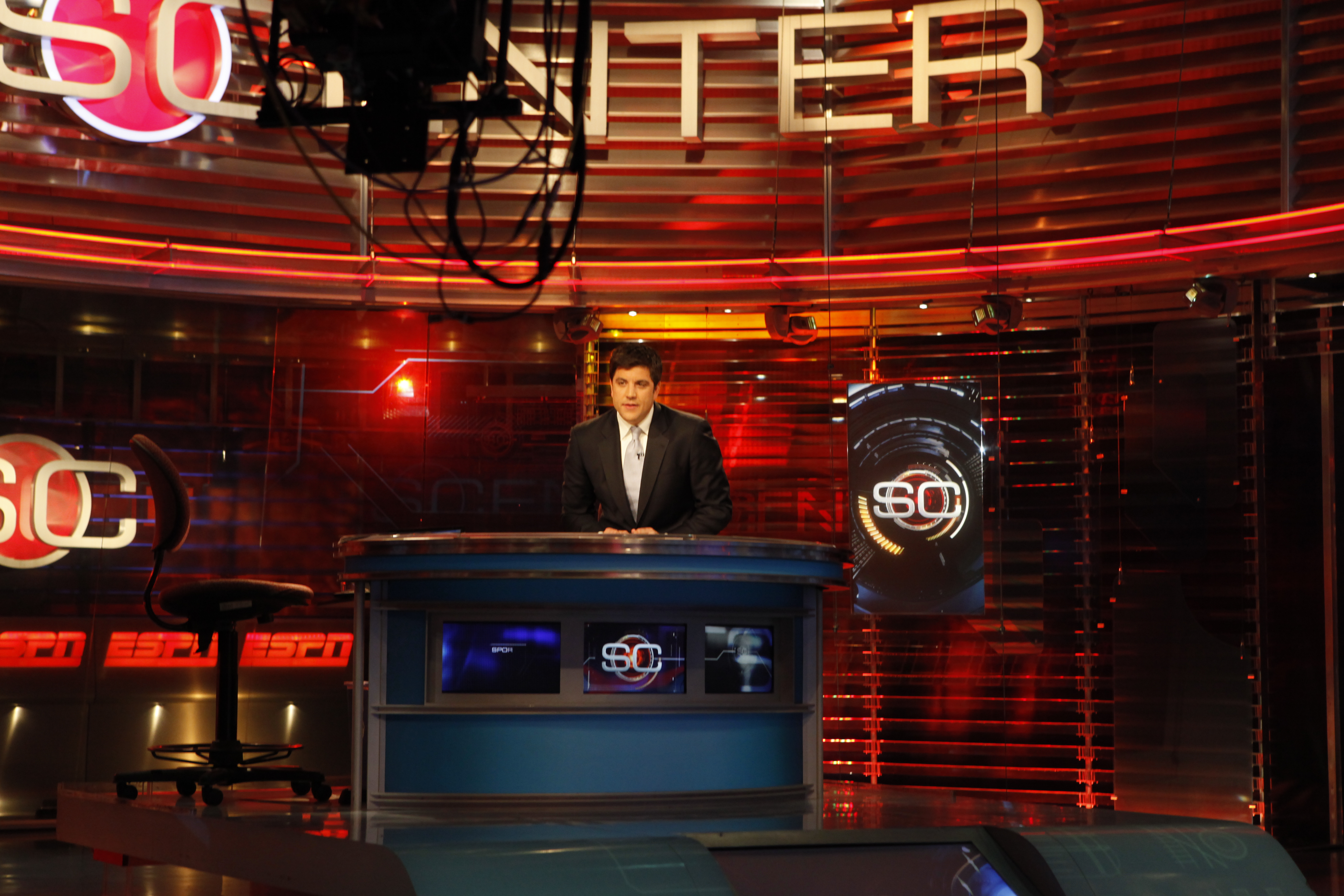
Elliott on the set of SportsCenter

Elliott first joined ESPN in 2004 as a panelist for Around the Horn and Jim Rome Is Burning, as well as serving as guest co-host for Cold Pizza on ESPN2. On ESPN Classic, Elliott hosted the short-lived Classic Now, which aired from June 2005 to March 2006. He also started appearing as a co-anchor on ESPNEWS and reporting for SportsCenter. After Classic Now was canceled, Elliott began contributing to ESPN the Magazine and ESPN.com.

When ESPN began airing SportsCenter live every weekday morning on August 11, 2008, Elliott was paired as an anchor with Hannah Storm for the first three hours of the programming block beginning at 9:00 a.m. ET.

=== Good Morning America ===
In May 2011, Elliott joined the team at ABC's Good Morning America following the departure of previous news anchor Juju Chang. He also started as a substitute anchor on the weekend edition of ABC World News, debuting on May 21, 2011. Joined by Lara Spencer, he also anchored Good Afternoon America, an afternoon spin-off broadcast from July 9 to September 7, 2012, as a temporary replacement for ABC's canceled talk show The Revolution.

=== NBC ===
On March 30, 2014, it was announced by ABC News President Ben Sherwood that Elliott had signed a contract with NBC, and would depart ABC News and Good Morning America. Amy Robach was announced as his immediate replacement. With NBC, Elliott made $4 million per year, but a six-month non-compete clause prohibited him from appearing on news-related programming, relegating him primarily to NBC Sports programming such as the 2014 Kentucky Derby—where he made his on-air debut. Upon his hiring, it was believed that NBC was contemplating Elliott to serve as a future host of Today; in response, he told the press that he "[hoped] Matt Lauer is here when I step away from this gig 30 years down the road. I can tell you that the only discussions I have had, as they relate to news, [are] ways to supply sports content to them." Elliott would, eventually, serve as a sports correspondent for the program.

In December 2015, it was reported that Elliott had left NBC.

=== CBS ===
On March 1, 2016, CBS News announced that it had hired Elliott to serve as the lead anchor for its digital news service CBSN. Of the hiring, CBS News president David Rhodes explained that Elliott needed an "outlet", going on to say that "we're going to need from him as much as he can bring in these different areas of reporting and anchoring. It's another reason it's the perfect place for him because it's kind of unlimited. We have some really hard-working people at CBSN, but we don't have enough of them."

On February 10, 2017, Elliott announced on-air that he would be leaving CBSN, but stated "knowing how things work around here, I may see you again on Monday morning". Elliott had been told by an executive that CBS had desired to place him in a larger role as a field correspondent, under which he would have filed reports for CBS's television news programs. However, CBS executives were caught off-guard by the abrupt announcement, and were unaware of any plans for him to be promoted from CBSN. On February 13, 2017, Elliott was fired.

=== Other work ===
Elliott received a local Emmy Award in New York City in 2005 for writing and contributing to Angles on MSG Network and served as one of the co-hosts for Super Bowl XL for Westwood One Sports. In 2018, Elliott co-hosted Yellowstone Live on National Geographic Channel with wildlife expert Chris Packham, a four-night event showcasing the Greater Yellowstone Ecosystem with feeds from dozens of live cameras and seven camera crews.

== Personal life ==
On July 11, 2015, Elliott married news anchor Liz Cho. On June 20, 2025, Elliott filed for divorce from Cho after 10 years of marriage.
