= Derek McGinty =

- Born: Washington, D.C., U.S.
- Occupation: News Anchor/ Journalist/ Radio Personality
- Years active: 1981–Present
- Known for: WUSA (TV) (2003–2015 as anchor) (1981–1998 as Radio Personality)

Derek McGinty is an American news anchor and television journalist, who in the 2010s anchored for WUSA-TV in Washington, D.C.

== Career ==
McGinty spent much of his early career hosting a radio talk show called The Derek McGinty Show from 1991 to 1998 on WAMU in Washington. There he covered local and national politics, hosted segments with "the computer guys", and offered a broad, eclectic mix of guests. Before that, he was a newsman on WHUR-FM, Howard University's commercial radio station. In October 1997, McGinty began to appear as a freelance reporter on the CBS news program Public Eye with Bryant Gumbel. After several months, he made the move permanent and left WAMU in January 1998.

McGinty joined ABC News in New York City, where he appeared on ABC's World News Now, and World News This Morning, HBO's Real Sports with Bryant Gumbel, and WUSA's Eye on Washington. In August 2015, his contract was not renewed for on-air news anchoring, but he announced that he would continue to host WUSA's Sunday morning show Capital Download.
