= Mark Mullen =

American journalist

Mark Edward Mullen
- Born: 1961 (age 63–64)
- Education: Loyola University New Orleans
- Occupation(s): Journalist, Anchorman
- Years active: 1980s–present
- Employer: KNSD-TV (NBC)
- Notable work: World News Now, China Rising
- Spouse: Jamie Flanagan
- Children: 2

Mark Edward Mullen (born 1961) is a television journalist and the anchorman for NBC owned-and-operated station KNSD-TV in San Diego. He joined the station in June, 2010 from ABC News, where he served as a Los Angeles-based correspondent. Prior to ABC, he was Chief Asia Correspondent for NBC News, regularly reporting news on notable Chinese and East Asian current events and contributing in-depth stories about China's changing culture, economy and political system. Mullen also has visited war zones to deliver stories from Iraq. He's covered stories from Europe and from across the U.S., including the aftermath of 9/11 and Hurricane Katrina. He's also drawn on his experience as a pilot to report on major plane crashes.

Mullen attended Loyola University in New Orleans from 1981 to 1987, where he majored in journalism and Spanish. His first job was as an anchor and reporter for WLOX-TV in Biloxi, Mississippi.

Mullen moved to KDFW in Dallas in 1989, and KRON-TV in San Francisco in 1991. In 1997, he was made anchor of the national ABC overnight newscast World News Now. He then returned to local news, with a stint at KING-TV in Seattle and a return to KRON-TV before joining NBC News as a national correspondent in 2003.

In late 2006 Mullen assumed a post in Beijing as NBC's first full-time correspondent in China since Ned Colt left in 2004. The new role was part of NBC's expansion of its bureau there, which was tied to the network's effort to increase visibility of China in anticipation of irs broadcast of the 2008 Olympic Games. In Beijing, Mullen produced a number of notable stories, including a weeklong series on the NBC Nightly News called "China Rising" which examined a multi-faceted, changing China in the context of the October 2007 Communist Party Congress. Mullen also contributed to the year-long series of Olympic countdown broadcasts for NBC's Today and Nightly News. His August 8 live stand-up from Tiananmen Square was the first live broadcast from the square since the Chinese government crackdown on student demonstrators in 1989.

Mullen has won numerous national and regional awards for his work. He is married to San Francisco native Jamie Flanagan with whom he has two children.
