= Rob Nelson (reporter) =

American television news anchor

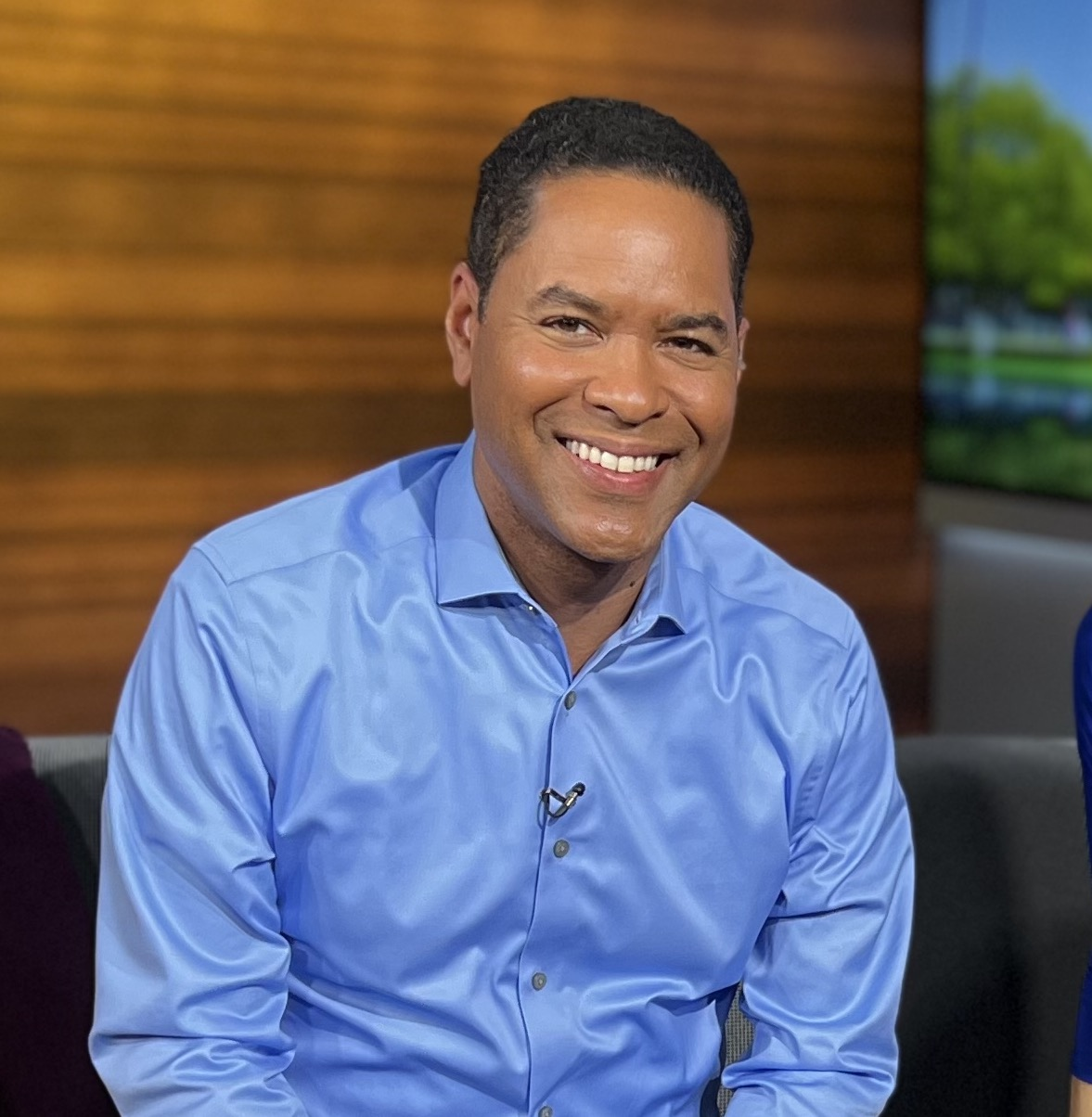
- Nelson on set in Atlanta
- Born: June 5, 1978 (age 48)
- Education: University of North Carolina at Chapel Hill
- Occupations: News anchor, NJ PBS
- Years active: 2000–present
- Children: 2

Rob Nelson (born June 5, 1978) is an American news presenter who currently works for NJ PBS. Previously, he served as the weekend morning anchor and weekday reporter at WABC-TV, the weeknight news anchor for NewsNation’s primetime newscast NewsNation Prime, and Scripps News's (formerly Newsy) morning program, Morning Rush. Nelson is currently the anchor of NJ PBS News as of October 1, 2026.

== Early life ==
Nelson was raised in Mount Laurel, New Jersey and graduated from the University of North Carolina at Chapel Hill.

== Career ==
After working seven years for the New Orleans newspaper The Times-Picayune, Nelson in June 2007 became a morning anchor for WWL-TV in that city. On July 7, 2010, he became co-anchor of the ABC overnight news program World News Now and that network's America This Morning. In January 2014, Nelson joined New York City's WABC-TV as co-anchor of the weekend morning newscasts, succeeding Phil Lipof. On February 24, 2020, he announced he was leaving the station to pursue other opportunities. Nelson subsequently headed to Chicago, where he helped Nexstar Media Group launch NewsNation for its national station WGN America. The program, launched September 2020 was originally three hours but over time the retitled NewsNation Prime was reduced to one hour as the rebranded NewsNation channel added more opinion and analysis programming. Nelson left NewsNation in August 2021.

Nelson signed on to be part of the relaunch of Newsy as it became a broadcast and streaming television news channel in October 2021 through November 2024. In doing so, he rejoined Kate O'Brian who hired him at WABC. He was the 4 p.m. to 7 p.m. anchor of Newsy Reports, a straight news program, and is based out of Atlanta. In June 2022, he became the co-anchor of Morning Rush with Alex Livingston.

On September 16, 2026, NJ PBS announced that Nelson will become the anchor of NJ PBS News program starting on October 1.

== Awards ==
Nelson has won awards from organizations including the Society of Professional Journalists, the National Association of Black Journalists, the Press Club of New Orleans and the Louisiana Press Association.
