= Asha Blake =

American journalist

- Born: August 20, 1961 (age 64); Guyana, South America
- Education: University of Minnesota
- Occupation: News Anchor

Asha Blake is a five-time Emmy Award-winning television news journalist. Her US-based career has spanned anchoring ABC and NBC network newscasts, daytime- and entertainment-based talk shows, and local news anchoring at flagship news stations KNBC and KTLA. In 1999, Blake co-hosted NBC's Later Today, a spinoff of the Today Show, with Jodi Applegate and Florence Henderson.

== Early life and education ==
Born in Guyana, South America, Blake grew up in Toronto and in Minnesota. She earned a bachelor's degree in journalism from the University of Minnesota's journalism school.

== Professional career ==
Blake began her career at KJCT-TV in Grand Junction, Colorado.

After "Later Today" went off the air in 2000, Blake hosted two syndicated programs, "Smart Gardening" on PBS and the nationally syndicated "Life Moments".

In 2005, Blake joined KWGN-TV.
