= Diane Macedo =

American news personality (born 1982)

- Born: Diane Reis Macedo; 1981 or 1982 (age 43–44)
- Occupation: News anchor
- Spouse: Thomas Morgan (m. 2013)
- Children: 2

Diane Reis Macedo (born 1981/1982) is an American news personality. She is currently employed by ABC News where she serves as one of the anchors of ABC News Live. She also frequently fills-in as the pop news anchor on the weekend version of Good Morning America. Before coming to ABC News, She was a weekend morning anchor for WCBS-TV in New York City. Macedo announced her departure from WCBS on March 6, 2016.

She used to be an editor for FoxNews.com and an on-air reporter for the Fox Business. She is also the lead female singer for a musical ensemble called Tribeca Rhythm.

== Career ==
Born and raised in Mineola, New York, Macedo is the daughter of immigrant parents from the Minho region of Portugal. She attended Boston College. There she was a political science and communications double major and a member of the co-ed a cappella singing group, the Bostonians of Boston College. Macedo began her career in journalism as a guest booker for Fox News Radio. She was promoted to a news editor and reporter for FoxNews.com, and to on-air broadcaster. From 2011 to 2013 Macedo was seen on the Fox Business reading business news during Imus in the Morning. She was also a regular panelist on the Fox News program Red Eye w/ Greg Gutfeld.

In addition to her past work as a mezzo-soprano with Paradise Alley, Macedo has performed with the New Jersey–based cover band TheGoodLife. She is fluent in Portuguese and Spanish.

== Personal life ==
She married Thomas Morgan in 2013. They have two children together.
