= Aaron Brown (journalist) =

American journalist (1948–2024)

- Brown reporting for CNN from New York City during the September 11 attacks
- Born: November 10, 1948; Minneapolis, Minnesota, U.S.
- Died: December 29, 2024 (aged 76); Washington, D.C., U.S.
- Occupation: Broadcast journalist
- Years active: 1976–2009 (in television)
- Notable credits: Wide Angle anchor (2008–2009); World News Saturday anchor (2006–2007); NewsNight with Aaron Brown anchor (2001–2005); Good Morning America Sunday anchor (1997–1999); Nightline reporter (mid 1990s); World News Now anchor (1992–1993)
- Spouse: Charlotte Raynor (m. 1982)
- Children: 1

Aaron Brown (November 10, 1948 – December 29, 2024) was an American broadcast journalist, most recognized for his coverage of the September 11 attacks for CNN. He was a longtime reporter for ABC, the founding co-anchor of ABC's World News Now, weekend anchor of World News Tonight, and the host of CNN's flagship evening program NewsNight with Aaron Brown. He was the anchor of the PBS documentary series Wide Angle from 2008 to 2009. He was a professor at the Walter Cronkite School of Journalism and Mass Communication at Arizona State University from 2007 to 2014.

== Career ==
=== Early life and career ===
Brown was born to a Jewish family in Minneapolis on November 10, 1948. He was the third of five children of Rose, a home-maker, and Morton, a scrap-metal dealer. In 1966, Brown dropped out of the University of Minnesota as a political science major and joined the U.S. Coast Guard reserves. He began his broadcasting career as a radio talk show host in Minneapolis and later in Los Angeles. Before his time at the national news networks, Brown was a Seattle broadcasting staple, spending more than 15 years at television stations there, first at KING-TV, the NBC affiliate, and then KIRO-TV the CBS affiliate. He was hired by Seattle's KING TV in 1976, initially working as an assignment editor but soon becoming a reporter and eventually anchor. In 1986 he moved to KIRO, where he anchored the evening newscast, and remained with KIRO until December 1991.

=== ABC ===
Brown was brought to New York City to be the founding co-anchor, with Lisa McRee, of the late-night news program World News Now. He also worked as a reporter for ABC's news operation. In July 1993, he left World News Now and soon began working as a reporter for World News Tonight with Peter Jennings, as well as Nightline and various other ABC programming. He became the substitute anchor for Jennings and the permanent anchor of ABC's World News Tonight Saturday and Good Morning America Sunday.

=== CNN ===
==== 9/11 ====
Although Brown's first day at CNN was July 1, 2001, his first on-air broadcast was September 11, 2001. He received international recognition as well as winning the Edward R. Murrow Award for his reporting of the attacks from CNN's rooftop in Manhattan, as well as the World Trade Center site and the areas surrounding the remains of the Twin Towers in New York City.

When the South Tower collapsed, Brown was listening to a report from the site of The Pentagon, where there was another attack. The building started to fall while Brown was offcamera, and he had to interrupt the reporter so he could report on what he had seen. Brown remarked that there was another massive explosion and that he could not see the building anymore (he was not aware that the entire building had fallen yet). As the second tower fell on live television, Brown fell silent, until he quietly said, "...good Lord...there are no words..." and resumed reporting after several seconds. CNN saw Brown as a protégé of Peter Jennings and wanted to duplicate Jennings' success for their network. CNN branded their flagship evening program NewsNight with Aaron Brown. Brown also served as host of CNN Presents and was assigned the lead anchor during breaking news and special events.

==== Post 9/11 ====
Brown covered numerous other news events for CNN, including the war on terrorism, the 2002 House and Senate elections, the Beltway sniper attacks and the Space Shuttle Columbia disaster. During the 2003 invasion of Iraq, Brown anchored from the CNN Center in Atlanta, providing viewers with the latest information from frontline reports as well as from Washington, D.C., and United States Central Command in Doha, Qatar.

In 2003, he garnered negative press attention for continuing to play in the Bob Hope Classic golf tournament in Palm Desert, California, after the Columbia Space Shuttle disaster occurred. While other major news anchors such as Tom Brokaw, Peter Jennings, and Dan Rather immediately left their vacations, Brown did not come into the studio and instead continued playing golf. The New York Times reported that Brown had actually been trying to get back to the studios, but CNN didn't go to special lengths to move Brown into position because Miles O'Brien, the channel's space expert, was anchoring the unfolding events.

During the United States 2004 presidential election, CNN used the NASDAQ Market Site for its election coverage, which some point to as the birth of the idea for Wolf Blitzer's The Situation Room. Brown was tasked to periodically make commentaries on the trends of the evening's results, while Anderson Cooper was then tasked at monitoring key Senate and House races.

Brown won three Emmys, including one Emmy for his report "Streets of Iraq" during the Iraq War. In addition, Brown won a DuPont, two New York Film Society World medals and a George Foster Peabody Award.

On November 3, 2005, CNN announced that Brown would be leaving the network, with Anderson Cooper's program Anderson Cooper 360° replacing NewsNight as the flagship program in CNN's evening lineup in an effort to shift toward a younger demographic. The two had shared anchoring duties in the 10:00 PM time slot through the early fall after Cooper's breakout success covering Hurricane Katrina. Many said Brown's cerebral "news for grown-ups" style would be missed.

=== Public broadcasting ===
Brown was under contract with CNN until June 2007, which prevented him from doing interviews or returning to television. In 2008, he returned to television as the host of PBS's Wide Angle. Brown was anchor of the series, and did reports from the field through the end of the series on September 2, 2009.

== In academia ==
In 2006, Brown assumed the John J. Rhodes Chair in Public Policy and American Institutions at Barrett, the Honors College at Arizona State University. He taught a course called "Turning Points in Television News History" at the Walter Cronkite School of Journalism at ASU from 2007 to 2014.

== Personal life and death ==
While working in Seattle in 1980, Brown met fellow newscaster Charlotte Raynor. They wed in 1982. They had one daughter, Gabby (b. 1988). Brown died of pneumonia in Washington, D.C. on December 29, 2024, at the age of 76.
