= Boyd Matson =

Boyd Matson (born April 26, 1947) is the former anchor of National Geographic Explorer and a former co-anchor of NBC's Sunday Today program. He was also an NBC News correspondent in the 1980s, working mostly on news features and earlier as a sports reporter on KNBC in Los Angeles. He now hosts the show Wild Chronicles on PBS and the nationwide radio program NG Weekend. He also writes a monthly column for NG Traveler magazine. He lives in McLean, Virginia with his wife, Betty Hudson, and their two children.
