= KDVR =

Television station in Denver

KDVR and KFCT

KDVR: Denver, Colorado; KFCT: Fort Collins, Colorado; United States
- Channels for KDVR: Digital: 36 (UHF); Virtual: 31
- Channels for KFCT: Digital: 21 (UHF); Virtual: 22
- Branding: Fox31 Denver; Fox31 News

Programming
- Affiliations: 31.1/22.1: Fox; 31.2/22.2: Antenna TV; 31.3/22.3: Roar

Ownership
- Owner: Nexstar Media Group; (Tribune Broadcasting Company II LLC)
- Sister stations: KWGN-TV; Tegna: KUSA, KTVD

History
- First air date: KDVR: August 10, 1983; KFCT: September 1, 1994
- Former call signs: KDVR: KTMX-TV (1981–1983); KFCT: KWXU (CP, 1992–1993)
- Former channel number: KDVR: Analog: 31 (UHF, 1983–2009); Digital: 32 (UHF, until 2020); KFCT: Analog: 22 (UHF, 1994–2009)
- Former affiliations: KDVR: Independent (1983–1986)
- Call sign meaning: KDVR: Denver; KFCT: Fort Collins Television

Technical information
- Licensing authority: FCC
- Facility ID: KDVR: 1261; KFCT: 125
- ERP: KDVR: 1,000 kW; KFCT: 50 kW
- HAAT: KDVR: 316 m (1,037 ft); KFCT: 233 m (764 ft)
- Transmitter coordinates: KDVR: 39°43′42.1″N 105°14′15.7″W; KFCT: 40°38′32″N 104°49′5″W
- Translator: see § Translators

Links
- Public license information: KDVR: Public file; LMS; KFCT: Public file; LMS
- Website: kdvr.com

KDVR (channel 31) is a television station in Denver, Colorado, United States, affiliated with the Fox network. It is simulcast full-time over satellite station KFCT (channel 22) in Fort Collins. KDVR and KFCT are owned by Nexstar Media Group alongside CW station KWGN-TV (channel 2); Nexstar's Tegna subsidiary owns KUSA (channel 9), an NBC affiliate, and KTVD (channel 20), an independent station with MyNetworkTV. KDVR and KWGN-TV share studios on East Speer Boulevard in Denver's Speer neighborhood. KDVR's transmitter is located atop Lookout Mountain, near Golden, while KFCT's transmitter lies atop Horsetooth Mountain just outside Fort Collins, covering Northern Colorado.

Channel 31 went on the air on August 10, 1983, as the first new commercial TV station in Denver in 30 years and the first full-service station on the ultra high frequency (UHF) band. The original permittee had intended to make channel 31 a Spanish-language station, but when census figures revealed fewer Hispanics lived in Denver than estimated, the group sold the permit. Centennial Broadcasting built the station as Denver's second English-language independent station. KDVR affiliated with Fox at its launch in 1986 and became competitive with longtime independent KWGN-TV. The station was sold twice in the early 1990s, to Chase Broadcasting in 1989 and to Renaissance Communications in 1992. These two groups obtained the permit for and built KFCT in Fort Collins in 1994.

Fox Television Stations, the owned-and-operated stations division of the Fox network, acquired KDVR in 1995 as part of a trade. It moved the station out of cramped facilities and into its present studios in 2000, allowing for the long-awaited debut of a local 9 p.m. newscast. KDVR's news ultimately expanded into mornings and displaced KWGN-TV in the ratings. After Fox spun out KDVR and other stations to Local TV LLC in 2007, Local TV and Tribune formed a local marketing agreement in 2008 that saw the merger of the KDVR and KWGN-TV news operations in the former's facilities; Tribune acquired KDVR outright in 2013. The station was then sold to Nexstar in 2019 as part of its acquisition of Tribune.

== History ==
=== Early history ===
In 1977, the Federal Communications Commission (FCC) received two applications to build new television stations in Denver. One came from a subsidiary of the Trinity Broadcasting Network, while the other was filed by La Unidad Broadcasting Corporation, headed by Denver broadcaster George Sandoval. While the commission adjudicated the applications, channel 31 in Denver made television history in February 1980 as the first ever satellite-fed translator with a direct program source, KA2XEG (also known as K31AA), which was launched by the Spanish International Network.

On February 24, 1981, the FCC granted the construction permit to La Unidad Broadcasting. Two months later, however, their plans for a Spanish-language television station would prove unviable. The 1980 United States census reported that 92,000 Hispanics lived in the Denver city limits. While Sandoval suspected that was an undercount of what he estimated were 125,000 Hispanics, the reliance of advertisers and other groups on census figures convinced the company that there was no market at the time for a Spanish-language station in Denver. As a result, La Unidad opted to pivot its plans for what was originally designated KTMX-TV. In late 1981, it sold 80 percent of the construction permit to Centennial Broadcasting Corporation, a subsidiary of Camellia City Telecasters and majority-owned by Business Men's Assurance Company (BMA) of Kansas City, Missouri (with Sandoval staying as manager). The reorganized ownership shifted its plan to operate a full-service English-language independent station incorporating programming for Hispanics in Denver. At that time, work was already underway on constructing a new tower atop Lookout Mountain and remodeling the former studios of KWGN-TV at 550 Lincoln Street. KTMX-TV was initially planned to share KWGN-TV's tower, but that station began stalling on a previous agreement once the possibility emerged that channel 31 might be an English-language station and its principal competitor.

Construction stretched into 1983, intermittently affected by weather at the transmitter site, and the station began broadcasting on August 10—23 days late due to technical issues. It was the first new commercial station in Denver since KBTV (channel 9) debuted in 1953 and offered a mix of syndicated reruns and movies. Centennial spent $7 million on the station's facilities. The station also joined a consortium of Spanish-language TV stations outside of the Spanish International Network for advertising sales in Spanish. Camellia City Telecasters launched a third independent station in October 1983, KPDX serving the Portland, Oregon, market. It then sued Tribune Broadcasting and Chris-Craft Industries, alleging that the two groups (which owned KWGN-TV in Denver and KPTV in Portland, their two independents' chief competition) had pooled their buying power and denied Camellia City the ability to bid on syndicated shows for their stations.

KDVR became a charter affiliate of Fox at its launch in October 1986. Fox programming helped the station charge higher advertising rates to close the gap with KWGN; from sign-on to sign-off, by February 1990, channel 31's ratings were only slightly behind those of channel 2.

=== Chase and Renaissance ownership ===
BMA put its Denver and Sacramento television stations on the market in October 1988. (Note: KPDX in Portland was sold in late 1986 to a minority investor in Camellia City in exchange for full ownership of KTXL.) It was the second time the company had done so; in 1985, all three had been on the market and attracted bids from such major players as Taft Broadcasting and Gaylord Broadcasting, but the startup KDVR and KPDX weighed down the value of the highly profitable KTXL. While a buyer was found for KTXL in December 1988, KDVR was sold to Chase Communications of Hartford, Connecticut, in March 1989 as the company's third television station. The sale announcement came days before founder Sandoval was killed in a car accident at the age of 57; when KDVR moved from 550 Lincoln to a building at 5th and Wazee streets later that year, it was dedicated in his honor. The former studio building was then demolished three years later. The new facility, however, soon proved inadequate for the station's long-term goals. It was cramped, isolated, and suffered from cellular interference issues.

Chase closed on its purchase of KDVR in March 1990. Between Hartford's WTIC-TV, KDVR, its acquisition of two stations owned by Outlet Communications, and the affiliation of Chase-owned WPTY-TV in Memphis, Tennessee, with Fox, the group grew to five Fox affiliates by that July. In 1991, Chase Broadcasting announced it would sell some or all of its properties to invest in new business ventures in Eastern Europe after the end of the Cold War, particularly successful cable television systems in Poland. The next year, it sold four of the five Fox affiliates, including KDVR, to Renaissance Communications of Greenwich, Connecticut.

Chase was approved by the FCC in 1992 for a construction permit to build channel 22 in Fort Collins (located 63.5 miles (102.2 km) north of Denver) as a satellite of KDVR. In November 1994, the station signed on the air as KFCT, expanding coverage to parts of northern Colorado and far southern Wyoming.

=== Fox Television Stations ownership ===
Renaissance sold KDVR and KFCT to Fox Television Stations for $70 million on November 15, 1994, in exchange for acquiring that network's owned-and-operated station in Dallas–Fort Worth, KDAF. Fox was selling KDAF because it was moving its programming to the previous CBS affiliate, KDFW, as a result of a ten-station affiliation deal with New World Communications. Fox was highly interested in the Denver market. Previous rumors had tied the network to a trade with Tribune of KDAF for KWGN-TV or with relocating the Fox affiliation to KWGN-TV or one of Denver's network affiliates, though the market's ABC, CBS, and NBC affiliates instead exchanged affiliations among themselves.

As part of a series of attempts to prevent News Corporation, the parent company of Fox, from acquiring additional stations, NBC filed a request to the FCC to reject the trade alleging that the company was in violation of foreign ownership rules (which prohibited a foreign-owned company from maintaining more than a 25 percent interest in a U.S. television station). Foreign ownership had been a sensitive issue for Fox even prior to the New World deal. In 1993, its attempt to acquire WGBS-TV in Philadelphia was derailed after the NAACP objected on ownership grounds. In the wake of the objection, the FCC opened a foreign ownership review into Murdoch's existing station holdings; had it ruled negatively, a forced ownership change or license loss could have meant the end of the network.

In July 1995, when the FCC granted Fox approval to buy KDVR and two additional stations in Boston and Memphis, the foreign-ownership issue was resolved, removing a roadblock to purchases by the company. Even then, Fox's desire for a lower channel number in Denver was the subject of rumors; one October 1995 article in Variety suggested that Fox wanted to sell KDVR to Qwest Broadcasting, a company backed by Quincy Jones and Tribune, and move its affiliation to KWGN-TV, leaving KDVR with The WB. That possibility was floated again in July 1996. A February 1997 article in Mediaweek floated that KDVR could have been part of a trade with Belo Corporation to acquire a station in Seattle.

Fox desired to begin airing local news programming, but it lacked the space to do so. On February 21, 1998, the company announced it would build a 70,000-square-foot (6,500 m^{2}) facility on the corner of Speer and Lincoln—the site from which KWGN-TV and KDVR had each started broadcasting, 30 years apart. This would be the third building overhaul project in the Fox Television Stations group in three years, following previous builds for KTTV in Los Angeles and KRIV in Houston. Once the building was complete, the station would add 60 employees and launch a 9 p.m. newscast. Ground was broken in April 1998, and the first KDVR newscast aired on July 16, 2000.

=== Local TV and Tribune ownership ===
On December 22, 2007, Fox Television Stations agreed to sell KDVR and seven other Fox owned-and-operated stations to Local TV LLC, a holding company operated by private equity firm Oak Hill Capital Partners), adding to the nine stations that the group had acquired that May from The New York Times Company. The sale was finalized on July 14, 2008. On September 17, Tribune Broadcasting announced that Local TV would begin managing KWGN-TV under a local marketing agreement and consolidate its operations with KDVR effective October 1. It was one of two markets where Local TV-owned Fox stations and Tribune-owned CW affiliates would share resources, alongside KTVI–KPLR-TV in St. Louis, and built on an existing management relationship between the companies. KWGN vacated its longtime studios in Greenwood Village and consolidated its operations with KDVR at its Speer Boulevard facility. Tribune bought KDVR outright in 2013 as part of its $2.75 billion acquisition of Local TV LLC.

Tribune sold the KDVR–KWGN studio to Urban Renaissance Group, a real estate firm from Seattle, in 2017, continuing to lease it back under a long-term agreement.

=== Sinclair purchase attempt; sale to Nexstar ===
In May 2017, Sinclair Broadcast Group announced its intention to buy Tribune Media. KDVR was then identified as one of 23 stations that Sinclair would divest to obtain regulatory approval for the merger, with Fox Television Stations agreeing to a repurchase as part of a $910 million deal. Both transactions were nullified on August 9, 2018, following Tribune Media's termination of the merger agreement and FCC chairman Ajit Pai's public rejection of the deal.

Nexstar Media Group announced it would acquire the assets of Tribune Media on December 3, 2018, for $6.4 billion in cash and debt. The deal closed on September 19, 2019.

On August 19, 2025, Nexstar Media Group agreed to acquire Tegna for $6.2 billion. In Denver, Tegna already owned KUSA and KTVD (channel 20). The deal was approved and completed on March 19, 2026. As part of the transaction, Nexstar committed to the divestiture of KTVD within two years, along with five other stations in markets where the two companies combined held four TV station licenses. KDVR continues to operate separately from KUSA as the legality of the merger is challenged, with Phil Weiser of Colorado among eight state attorneys general who have filed to block the deal.

== Local programming ==
=== News operation ===
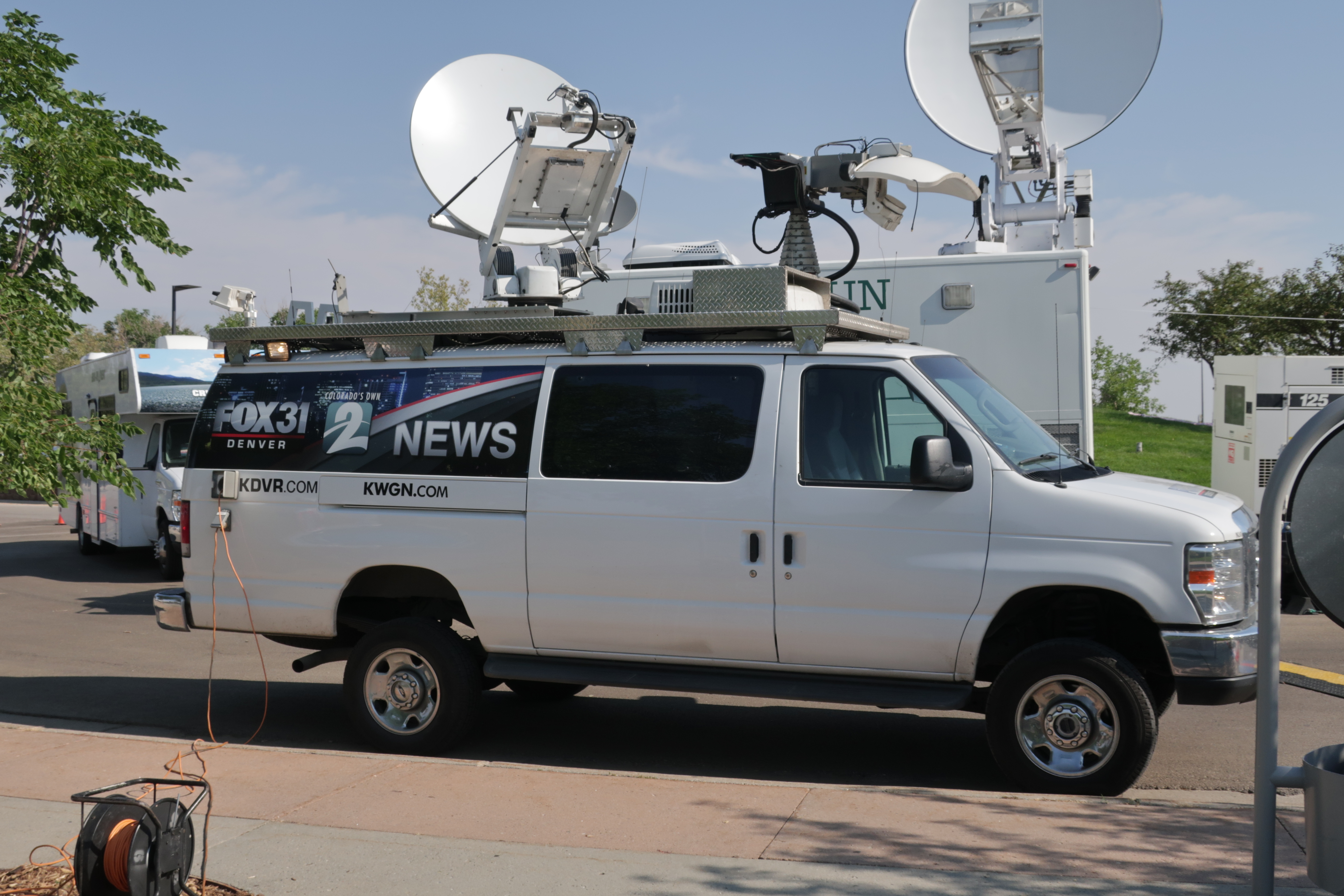
A KDVR–KWGN-TV outside broadcasting van in Casper, Wyoming, during the 2017 total solar eclipse

Rumors of a local newscast for KDVR first surfaced under Renaissance ownership in 1994. This continued after Fox took ownership of channel 31, but the primary obstacle was a lack of room. KDVR's Wazee Street building was 20,000 square feet (1,900 m^{2}) in size, and Fox believed it needed 60,000 square feet (5,600 m^{2}) to start a newscast. Upon announcing the construction of the News and Technology Center, with 70,000 square feet (6,500 m^{2}) of space, Fox also announced it would begin producing local news in Denver when the building opened; general manager Robert M. Simone promised that "local news done 'Fox-style' will further bond KDVR to the community".

The first step in organizing the news department was made by Fox in September 1999, when a news director was hired. More hires were made in the final weeks of 1999 and first months of 2000, including consumer reporter Tom Martino; David Treadwell, former Denver Broncos kicker, to anchor sports; news anchors Libby Weaver, former co-host of the syndicated entertainment news program Extra, and Ron Zappolo, former KCNC and KUSA sports anchor crossing over to news; and former KUSA reporter Phil Keating.

After the Technology Center opened, rehearsals began in May, and the hour-long Fox 31 News at 9 O'Clock debuted on July 16, 2000. With Fox's successful Sunday night lineup, the main news anchors appeared on a Sunday–Thursday shift instead of a more typical Monday–Friday schedule. Out of the gate, the 9 p.m. newscast was a strong ratings performer, outrating the established 9 p.m. newscast on KWGN-TV as well as the entertainment programming KDVR had aired in that hour. In July 2001, a year after starting up, KDVR was beating ABC affiliate KMGH-TV, the traditional third-rated station, in the ratings, even though their newscasts aired at different times. While KWGN-TV remained competitive, logging a head-to-head win in November 2002, KDVR gradually pulled away from its competitor.

KDVR expanded news programming to mornings on March 22, 2004, with the debut of Good Day Colorado, which was created to compete with KWGN's weekday morning newscast, WB2 Morning News. The new morning show was promoted with a custom song performed by Denver singer Wendy Woo. Good Day Colorado was initially a 2 1/2-hour newscast beginning at 5:30 a.m. but expanded to four hours (5–9 a.m.) by May 2006, when founding news director Bill Dallman departed. The station's first weeknight early evening newscast debuted in August 2008.

After entering into the local marketing agreement, major changes were made to KDVR and KWGN's evening news programming that reduced overlap between the stations. KWGN discontinued its 5:30 p.m. newscast on January 12, 2009, while KDVR expanded its early evening newscast to an hour at 5 p.m. On March 30, KWGN moved its prime time newscast two hours earlier to 7 p.m., making the unusual move of airing The CW programming from 8–10 p.m. with the network's blessing.

News expansions continued in the 2010s. On June 28, 2010, KDVR added a half-hour 10 p.m. newscast titled Fox 31 Nightside, which focused on hard-hitting enterprise stories. In 2016, KDVR began airing an 11 a.m. news hour and a 4:30 a.m. extension to Good Day Colorado. During this time, some of the station's original news personalities departed. Zappolo and Weaver continued to anchor KDVR's 9 p.m. newscast until the latter left in 2012; Zappolo left months later. Martino, who worked at KHOW radio concurrent with his time at KDVR, was dismissed in 2011 after he announced he was filing for Chapter 7 bankruptcy; he sued the station alleging discrimination, a matter which was settled in 2014.

On January 9, 2024, approximately 75 part- and full-time employees of KDVR and KWGN voted to unionize with NABET-CWA, including production technicians, newsroom staff, and workers at a master control hub for multiple Nexstar-owned stations also based at the KDVR facilities. Employees cited a lack of pay equity and transparency as the basis for their vote; in particular, salaries for part-time production staff started at $17.29 per hour, slightly above the state minimum wage of $14.42 per hour.

=== Sports programming ===
On August 7, 2014, KDVR entered into a partnership with the Denver Broncos to broadcast the team's weekly coaches show, Broncos Zone, which was known as Fox on Fox when John Fox was the head coach; it airs during the season on Friday evenings, replacing half of the 9 p.m. newscast, and is hosted by sports director Nick Griffith.

=== Other programming ===
From 2009 to 2010, KDVR aired Everyday with Libby and Natalie, a daytime lifestyle program hosted by Libby Weaver and reporter Natalie Tysdal. The program performed poorly in the ratings and was shifted to KWGN-TV in 2010.

On June 1, 2014, KDVR debuted #COpolitics – From the Source, an unconventionally formatted Sunday morning political discussion program that was taped at The Source food market in Denver. It ended when host Eli Stokols left KDVR–KWGN after a decade for Politico the next year.

=== Notable on-air staff ===
- Crystal Egger – Good Day Colorado meteorologist, 2007–2010
- Jeremy Hubbard – reporter/anchor, 2004–2007; anchor, since 2011

== Technical information ==
=== Subchannels ===
KDVR's transmitter is located atop Lookout Mountain, near Golden, while KFCT's transmitter lies atop Horsetooth Mountain just outside Fort Collins. The stations' signals are multiplexed:

Subchannels of KDVR and KFCT
Subchannel		Res.	Short name		Programming
KDVR	KFCT	Res.	KDVR	KFCT	Programming
31.1	22.1	720p	KDVR-DT	KFCT-DT	Fox
31.2	22.2	480i	Antenna		Antenna TV
31.3	22.3	480i	ROAR		Roar
2.1		720p	KWGN-DT		The CW (KWGN-TV)

Broadcast on behalf of another station

In December 2020, KWGN-TV began broadcasting in ATSC 3.0 (NextGen TV) format. At that time, KWGN-TV's main signal was moved to the KDVR-KFCT multiplex.

=== Analog-to-digital conversion ===
KDVR shut down its analog signal, over UHF channel 31, on June 12, 2009, the official date on which full-power television stations in the United States transitioned from analog to digital broadcasts under federal mandate. The station's digital signal remained on its pre-transition UHF channel 32, using virtual channel 31. The station was then repacked to channel 36 in 2020.

=== Translators ===
In addition to KFCT, KDVR is relayed on the following translator stations:

- Anton: K15MH-D
- Basalt: K33HY-D
- Haxtun: K33GM-D
- Holyoke: K29GI-D
- Idalia: K14LB-D
- Julesburg: K22KW-D
- Peetz: K18FN-D
- Pleasant Valley: K14KL-D
- Redstone: K18GD-D
- Snowmass Village: K14OV-D
- Sterling, Southern Logan County: K34OS-D
- Thomasville: K12QM-D
- Wray: K15MD-D
- Yuma: K31PC-D
- Big Laramie, WY: K10FQ-D
