= ABC News Live =

American streaming news network

- Broadcast area: Worldwide

Programming
- Picture format: 1080i (HDTV)

Ownership
- Parent: ABC News

History
- Launched: ABC News Now; July 26, 2004; 22 years ago ABC News Live; March 2018; 8 years ago
- Closed: ABC News Now; April 27, 2009; 17 years ago (4 years, 275 days)

Links
- Webcast: https://abcnews.com/Live

Availability

Streaming media
- The Roku Channel: Channel 100
- Service(s): DirecTV Stream, Disney+, FuboTV, Google TV, Haystack News, Hulu, LG Channels, Pluto TV, Prime Video Live TV, Samsung TV Plus, Sling Freestream, The Roku Channel, Tubi, Vizio Watch Free+, Xumo Play, YouTube TV

ABC News Live is a U.S.-based streaming video news channel for breaking news, live events, newscasts, and longer-form reports and documentaries operated by ABC News since 2018. The channel is available through various streaming platforms such as Hulu, Disney+, YouTube TV and YouTube, DirecTV Stream, Sling TV, Pluto TV, Xumo, Tubi, FuboTV, Haystack News, The Roku Channel, Samsung TV Plus, and the news division's website and apps. Centaur Communications provides the channel to Belize.

== History ==
=== As ABC News Now ===
After having attempted a 20-minute online news program three times a week hosted by Sam Donaldson in 1999, ABC News launched ABC News Now in March 2003. The service was fee-based except for the customers of America Online, Comcast, and a few other Internet providers. Later, mobile phone users could access the programming through Sprint's MobiTV. The ABCNN service launched on July 24, 2004, with extended coverage of the Democratic National Convention and Republican National Convention. It was offered via digital television, broadband and streaming video at ABCNews.com and on mobile phones. It delivered breaking news, headline news every half hour, and a wide range of entertainment and lifestyle programming.

On January 31, 2005, ABC News removed ABC News Now from owned and operated and affiliated TV stations' subchannel as the channel ended its experimental phase, originally expected to end after election day but extended past inauguration. The channel would continue on the internet and wireless devices. 20/20 senior broadcast producer Mike Clemente was then hired as executive producer to head up the channel as a part of an increasing capacity being developed for the channel to return as a permanent channel in the Spring. The channel was relaunched as a digital terrestrial television network, cable channel, and broadband service in early April 2005.

On November 5, 2007, Disney-ABC International Television announced plans to launch the channel in international territories, including Germany, Spain and Belgium in 2008 on IPTV service Zattoo, with more territories, including the United Kingdom, planned for the next 6 months. This marked the second international channel launched under ABC branding, the first being the United Kingdom general entertainment channel ABC1 which closed on September 26, 2007.

On October 28, 2013, ABC News launched a new cable news channel, Fusion, as a joint venture with Univision and contributing its ABC News Now operations. In 2021, Fusion ceased operations.

=== As ABC News Live ===
With news channels getting high ratings from the 2016 election and ABC News having exited its joint venture news channel, ABCNL launched exclusively on Roku in March 2018 then added to Facebook Watch and ABC apps and websites. Also on October 26, 2018, the channel was added to Hulu with Live TV followed by Hulu SVOD on March 20, 2020. On September 4, 2024, ABC News Live launched on Disney+.

On April 21, 2020, ABC News Live launched on YouTube TV and Amazon's news app on Fire TV.

On January 23, 2020, ABC News announced an expansion of staffing for the streaming channel and changes in programming to add newscasts, long-form reports, and documentaries being rolled out over a month. Justin Dial, formerly of Vice News Tonight, was hired as senior executive producer of ABC News Live. Tom Llamas (now at NBC News) would anchor breaking news coverage at the time of the Iowa caucuses, while Linsey Davis would anchor two weekday one-hour evening newscasts. ABC News planned, as of March 2020, that ABCNL would air 18 hours of programming daily.

== Programming ==
=== Current programming ===
==== As ABC News Live ====
- ABC News Live, weekday daytime newscasts between 8 am-7 pm|ET hosted by Diane Macedo and Kyra Phillips during 8 am-12 pm and 12-4 pm respectively.
- ABC News Live Reports, a weekday 2-hour evening newscast between 5 pm-7 pm|ET hosted by Kayna Whitworth (September 2023-)
- ABC News Live Prime, a weekday 90-minute evening newscasts between 7 pm-8:30 pm|ET hosted by Linsey Davis (February 2020-)
- ABC World News Now, a daily half-hour early morning newscast, hosted by Sophie Flay and Hanna Battah
- ABC World News Tonight with David Muir, a rebroadcast of the ABC news program hosted by David Muir on weekdays, Whit Johnson on Saturdays, and Linsey Davis on Sundays. Nielsen ranks the show as American television's most-watched evening news program since 2016.
- GMA Life, a 30-minute weekend roundup featuring lifestyle and pop culture segments aired on Good Morning America around the week hosted by Lori Bergamotto and Ashan Singh
- The Weekend View, a 30-minute weekend best of The View from the past week
- What Would You Do?, a hidden camera show, weekend rebroadcasts started in 2022, hosted John Quiñones
- 20/20, a weekly hour-long true crime program hosted by David Muir and Deborah Roberts.
- Nightline, an hour-long late-night news program that normally airs weeknights on ABC after Jimmy Kimmel Live!. Hosted on rotation by Byron Pitts and Juju Chang
- This Week, a weekly Sunday morning talk show hosted on rotation by George Stephanopoulos, Martha Raddatz and Jonathan Karl; airs on a delayed basis during Sunday afternoons after its morning broadcast on ABC

=== Former programming ===
==== As ABC News Now ====
- Tech This Out!—Technology news and a consumer guide to gadgets, hosted by Daniel Sieberg.
- Good Morning America Health—GMA Health is a third hour of Good Morning America and also is themed toward health news and other health-related topics, airing 2 pm/ET. Its predecessor was Good Morning America Now which was canceled due to lack of viewers. Its final broadcast was October 2008.
- Inside the Newsroom—2x times daily.
- Money Matters—Financial and economic news and tips right after the NYSE opening bell.
- Good Money—Personal finance information for everyday consumers and small business owners.
- The Daily Download—feature stories, viral videos and stories from off the beaten path.
- Popcorn with Peter Travers—An interview-based movie show, with stars talking to Rolling Stone movie reviewer Peter Travers.
- Amplified—Indie music and interviews, brought to you by ABC News anchor Dan Harris.
- TopLine—Inside the political arena with Rick Klein.
- What's the Buzz—celebrity entertainment news.
- World Piece — featured one international news story
- World View—Round-up of headlines from around the world.
- Now You Know—Living Advice and News Briefs along with Weather, Now You Know was ABC News Now's morning program.
- Chef's Table

=== As ABC News Live ===
- Around the Table (September 10, 2019 -?) - an irregular presidential candidate interview program in which Democratic candidates are interviewed by three voters and moderated by anchors and correspondents around a table. Episodes would be used as a part of that night's Nightline. In the first episode, Byron Pitts moderates Beto O'Rourke with the second episode being Linsey Davis moderating Senator Cory Booker.
- Guardians of the Amazon (February 2020) - a documentary regarding rainforest destruction, produced by the Nightline team.
- GMA3: What You Need to Know (2020–2025), a weekday, hour-long daytime news program on ABC. It premiered in March 2020 as Pandemic: What You Need To Know, as a temporary replacement for its talk show Strahan, Sara and Keke to cover the onset of the COVID-19 pandemic in the United States, before eventually replacing it indefinitely. In March 2025, the program—which, despite the Good Morning America branding, had remained produced separately by the ABC News Live unit—was brought back under the GMA staff and executive producer Simone Swink as part of cuts by ABC News.
