= Bill Lawrence (news personality) =

American journalist and television news analyst

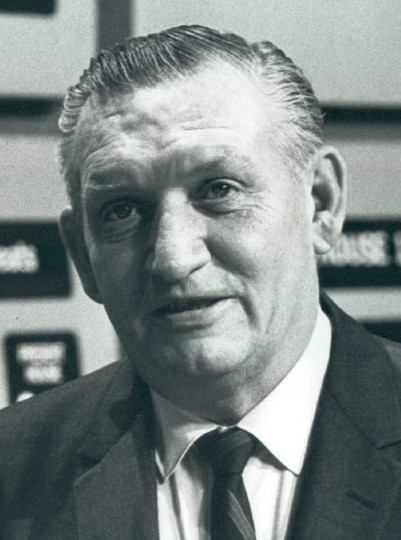
- Bill Lawrence publicity photo advertising ABC's upcoming coverage of the 1968 presidential election
- Born: William H. Lawrence; January 29, 1916; Lincoln, Nebraska, U.S.
- Died: March 2, 1972 (aged 56); Bedford, New Hampshire, U.S.
- Occupation(s): Newspaper reporter and television news personality
- Years active: 1932–1972
- Spouses: Elizabeth Currie; Constance MacGregor
- Children: William Lawrence; Ann Lawrence
- Awards: Peabody Award (1965)

William H. Lawrence (January 29, 1916 – March 2, 1972) was an American journalist and television news personality whose 40-year career as a reporter began in 1932 and included a 20-year stint (1941–61) with The New York Times, for which he reported from major fronts of World War II, Korean War and, subsequently, as the newspaper's White House correspondent. In 1961 he joined ABC News where, for nearly 11 years, he served as the network's political affairs editor and, during his first year, as an evening news anchorman.

== Background ==
A native Nebraskan, Lawrence was born in the state capital, Lincoln, and briefly attended the city's University of Nebraska.

== Career ==
Lawrence dropped out of college to join hometown newspaper the Lincoln Star as a 17-year-old cub reporter.

=== Newswires ===
In 1935, at the age of 19, he moved to the Associated Press and, two years later, to the United Press. The first major assignment he covered for UP was the 1936–37 Flint Sit-Down Strike against General Motors and, having won plaudits for his reporting, was reassigned to Washington.

=== New York Times ===
At the beginning of 1941, Arthur Krock, Washington bureau chief of The New York Times, was impressed so by his assertiveness in ferreting out news that he offered Lawrence a position as one of the bureau's reporters. In his twenty years with The Times, the 1940s byline, "By William H. Lawrence" and, in the 1950s and 1960–61, "By W. H. Lawrence" appeared over coverage from World War II, the Korean War and the Cold War. His battlefront reporting took him to Okinawa, Guam, Japan and Moscow, where he was assigned as a war correspondent in 1943 and, during the immediate postwar period, continued to file stories from such diverse locations as Poland, the Balkans and South America. In January 1944, he was part of the delegation of Western correspondents who visited the graves in Katyn forest at the invitation of the Soviets. On September 13, 1945, Lawrence published a leading article in The New York Times with an all-capitals headline that read: "NO RADIOACTIVITY IN HIROSHIMA; WHAT OUR SUPERFORTRESSES DID TO A JAPANESE PLANE PRODUCTION CENTER. Between 1950 and 1953, he spent months in Korea covering the war and interviewing soldiers in a series of personal human interest articles which appeared in The Times.

In 1959 he served as president of the National Press Club and appeared in an episode of the United States Army television documentary series The Big Picture where he was first shown in a film clip introducing General Maxwell D. Taylor who, in June, made a speech to the club on the occasion of his retirement as Army Chief of Staff. In the following segment, The Big Picture host, Master Sergeant Stuart Queen, asked Lawrence to recount his Korean War experiences from nine years earlier, during the September 1950 Battle of Inchon and Second Battle of Seoul, as well as the individual and private face of war that he saw by remaining alongside the common fighting man. By 1959, as in the two preceding years, the great majority of Lawrence's efforts were devoted to the Washington political scene, with almost all of the stories appearing on the front page, including the final one he wrote for The Times, datelined May 26, 1961.

=== ABC News ===
In May 1961, James Hagerty, who served as United States President Dwight D. Eisenhower's Press Secretary and, immediately upon the end of the Eisenhower administration, filled John Daly's vacated position as vice-president in charge of ABC's low-rated news operation, offered Lawrence, whom he knew well from Lawrence's time as White House correspondent, a top-level position at the news department. His first assignment as ABC's chief news analyst was to accompany Hagerty on a European trip to cover President John F. Kennedy's first overseas visit as Chief Executive. Within the course of his first months with the network, since Hagerty would not take over Daly's other position, that of anchorman for ABC's evening news, Lawrence, on September 25, joined newscaster Al Mann and former NBC anchorman John Cameron Swayze in a new three-anchor team to replace Bill Shadel who had been serving as the ABC Evening Report anchorman since Daly's November 16, 1960 resignation, and final broadcast on December 16, after seven years in the post. The anchor team, however, proved unsuccessful, and, following their last broadcast six months later, on March 22, 1962, ABC returned to the single-anchorman concept with Ron Cochran at the helm of ABC Evening Report until his replacement by 26-year-old Canadian Peter Jennings on February 1, 1965.

In the aftermath of his brief stint as co-anchor, Bill Lawrence, as he was exclusively known at ABC, became preoccupied with his duties as the news department's political editor and, in the days following the November 1968 presidential election, national affairs editor. The face of the network's political coverage, he frequently hosted or appeared on its Sunday morning news interview program, Issues and Answers and was continually visible during primaries, conventions and elections to the extent that his coverage of the 1964 Presidential election won him the Peabody Award for "Outstanding Reportorial Work". In 1966, almost two years before United States President Lyndon B. Johnson made his "I shall not seek and will not accept my party's nomination" speech of March 31, 1968, he was the sole major news analyst to predict that the president would not run.

In 1968 Lawrence was diagnosed with pulmonary edema, which caused his lungs to fill with fluid and put a strain on his heart. His colleagues became aware of the condition when he collapsed at his desk immediately following one of the broadcasts from the 1968 Republican National Convention in Miami Beach. Quickly recovering, he was able to continue working during his remaining three-and-a-half years and, as a sports fan, also began covering some athletic events and even personally served as the commentator for ABC's coverage of the 1969 World Series. He was also a skilled moderator of political debates and traveled around the country in such capacity. During ABC's coverage of the 1970 midterm elections, he served as national affairs editor alongside anchors Howard K. Smith and Frank Reynolds.

In March 1971, with the following year's presidential elections looming on the horizon, Lawrence requested a reduced workload, with a partial leave of absence, to finish his autobiography. While fulfilling occasional major assignments, such as a rare primetime interview with Supreme Court Chief Justice Warren Burger on July 5, he did not return full-time until October, when a resumption of his busy schedule covering the presidential campaign continued through February 1972 and a trip to New Hampshire as ABC's reporter detailing the crucial presidential primary race between early favorite, Senator Edmund Muskie and his strong challenger, Senator George McGovern.

Five weeks earlier, around the time of his 56th birthday on January 29, Lawrence and ABC Evening News co-anchor, Howard K. Smith, filmed a few scenes for The Man, the made-for-TV-but-released-to-theaters feature-film version of Irving Wallace's bestselling 1964 eponymous novel, The Man. In this multi-plot story of an African-American political figure who, while serving as President pro tempore of the Senate, suddenly succeeds to the Presidency, the two top national newscasters play fictional versions of themselves in brief segments which show them delivering the news of and discussing the world-shaking event. The film ultimately opened in July, four-and-a-half months after Lawrence's death.

== Personal life and death ==
Bill Lawrence and his first wife, Elizabeth Currie, were the parents of two children, William and Ann. Following divorce, he married Constance MacGregor, with that marriage also ending in divorce. The autobiography, Six Presidents, Too Many Wars, which recounted his coverage of the administrations of Presidents Roosevelt, Truman, Eisenhower, Kennedy, Johnson and Nixon as well as of the combat in World War II, Korea and Vietnam in addition to myriad other international conflicts, was published shortly before the presidential election. In his October 1, 1972 review for The New York Times Sunday Book Section, critic Gerald W. Johnson, noted that "Bill was recalcitrant. Popular idols were not his dish. His book, in fact, is tonic at a moment when the impression is widespread that conformity is the curse of the writing classes."

On March 2, 1972, five days before the vote, he suffered a heart attack at the Wayfarer Motor Inn in Bedford, a suburb of the state's largest city, Manchester, and was dead on arrival at Manchester's Notre Dame Hospital.

== Awards ==
- 1965: Peabody Award
- 1972: Trustees Award at the 1972 Emmy Awards (posthumous)

Preceded by Bill Shadel	ABC Evening News anchor with Al Mann and John Cameron Swayze; 1961–1962	Succeeded by Ron Cochran

Media offices
Preceded by John Edwards	ABC News Chief White House Correspondent	Succeeded by Frank Reynolds
