= ABC World News Tonight =

American television news program

- Also known as: News and Views (1948–1951); After the Deadlines (1951–1952); All-Star News (1952–1953); John Daly and the News (1953–1960); ABC Evening Report (1960–1962); Ron Cochran with the News (1962–1965); Peter Jennings with the News (1965–1967); ABC Evening News (1968–1978); World News Tonight (1978–1983); World News Tonight with Peter Jennings (1983–2005); World News Tonight with Bob Woodruff and Elizabeth Vargas (2006); World News Tonight with Charles Gibson (2006); World News with Charles Gibson (2006–2009); ABC World News with Diane Sawyer (2009–2014); ABC World News Tonight with David Muir (2014–2020); World News Tonight with David Muir (2020–present)
- Genre: News program
- Created by: Roone Arledge (World News Tonight)
- Directed by: Rob Vint; Ron Halper; David Distinti; Paul Verciglio
- Presented by: Weekdays: David Muir; Saturdays: Whit Johnson; Sundays: Linsey Davis; (See former anchors)
- Narrated by: JJ Surma
- Theme music composer: Bob Israel (1978–1990); Score Productions (1990–1996); Edd Kalehoff (1996–2012; 2020–present); Hans Zimmer (2012–2020)
- Composer: Edd Kalehoff (2020–present)
- Country of origin: United States
- Original language: English

Production
- Executive producer: Almin Karamehmedovic (2014–present)
- Production locations: ABC News Headquarters; New York City
- Camera setup: Multi-camera
- Running time: 15 minutes (1953–1967); 30 minutes (1967–present)
- Production company: ABC News Productions

Original release
- Network: ABC
- Release: January 13, 1948 – present

Related
- World News Now; Good Morning America First Look; Good Morning America; GMA3; Competitors: NBC Nightly News; CBS Evening News; PBS News Hour

ABC World News Tonight (titled ABC World News Tonight with David Muir for its weeknight broadcasts since September 2014) is the flagship daily evening television news program of ABC News, the news division of the American Broadcasting Company (ABC) television network in the United States. It is currently the most watched network newscast in the United States, with an average of 2 million more than its nearest rival, NBC Nightly News. Since 2014, the program's weekday broadcasts have been anchored by David Muir. As of February 6–7, 2021, Whit Johnson and Linsey Davis anchor the Saturday and Sunday editions of the newscast respectively.

The program has been anchored at various times by a number of other presenters since its debut in 1948. It also has used various titles, including ABC Evening News from 1968 to 1978, World News Tonight from 1978 to 2006, World News from 2006 to 2009, and ABC World News from 2009 to 2014. Since 2014, the program has been called ABC World News Tonight. The weeknight edition of ABC World News Tonight airs live at 6:30 p.m. in the Eastern and 5:30 p.m. in the Central Time Zones. However ABC affiliates KGNS, KNOE-2, WEEK-2, and WNCF air ABC World News Tonight half-an-hour later on delay. WSB and WGTU also air it on a delay, the only ABC stations in the Eastern Time Zone to do so.

== History ==
The then-newly-launched ABC television network began a nightly newscast in the summer of 1948, when H. R. Baukhage and Jim Gibbons hosted News and Views. This was succeeded by After the Deadlines in 1951 and All Star News in 1952. In the fall of 1953, John Daly began anchoring the then-15-minute John Daly and the News. Daly, who served as host of the CBS game show What's My Line? contemporaneously, anchored the newscast until 1960, with multiple hosts and formats succeeding him. Anchors of the program during the early 1960s, sometimes for short periods, included Alex Dreier, John Secondari, Fendall Winston Yerxa, Al Mann, Bill Shadel, and the three-person team of John Cameron Swayze (formerly of NBC), Bill Lawrence, and Bill Sheehan. In 1962, Ron Cochran was appointed as full-time anchor, staying with the program, entitled, “Ron Cochran with the News”, until 1965. After Cochran left the program, Peter Jennings, a Canadian journalist who was 26 years old at the time, was named anchor of the retitled Peter Jennings with the News.

In December 1967, the inexperienced Jennings left the anchor chair and was reassigned by the news division as an international correspondent for the news program. The newly renamed ABC Evening News was hosted, in succession, by Bob Young (January 1968 to May 1968), and then by Frank Reynolds (May 1968 to December 1970), who was joined by Howard K. Smith in May 1969. The program expanded from 15 to 30 minutes in January 1967, nearly 3 1/2 years after both CBS and NBC had expanded their evening news programs to a half-hour.

=== Reasoner, Smith, and Walters ===
Harry Reasoner, formerly of CBS News and 60 Minutes, joined ABC News in 1970 to co-anchor ABC Evening News with Smith, beginning that December, replacing Reynolds. The ratings increased steadily, but still remained in third place, behind dominant CBS and NBC. In 1975, Howard K. Smith was moved to a commentator role, and Reasoner briefly assumed sole-anchor responsibilities until he was paired with Barbara Walters, who became the first female network anchor when she joined the program on October 4, 1976. Ratings for the nightly news broadcast declined shortly thereafter, possibly due in part to the lack of chemistry between Reasoner and Walters. Reasoner would eventually return to CBS and 60 Minutes, while Walters became a regular on the newsmagazine 20/20.

=== "First News" strategy (1967–1982) ===
Even in areas with three full-time network affiliates, ABC stations often opted to broadcast the news program in the 6:00 p.m./5:00 p.m. timeslot to entice viewers by presenting the day's national and international news first, thus making it more likely that they would stay tuned to the station's local newscast immediately following the program (or one half-hour afterward), instead of turning to CBS or NBC.

Starting in 1973, before the advent of closed captioning, PBS began airing an open captioned version of the ABC Evening News that was distributed to various public television stations throughout the U.S., airing mostly in late-night timeslots five hours after the original ABC broadcast. This version was produced by WGBH, the Boston PBS station, which provided the captions and repackaged the broadcast with additional news stories – some of which were of special interest to the hearing impaired – as well as late-news developments, weather forecasts, and sports scores inserted in place of commercials. It was originally titled The Captioned ABC Evening News, and later as The Captioned ABC News, and it was originally distributed by the Eastern Educational Network, before becoming a national program under PBS a year later. The practice continued until 1982, when real-time closed captioning was first introduced in the United States by the National Captioning Institute.

=== World News Tonight (first era) ===
==== The early years (1978–1983) ====
Always the perennial third in the national ratings, ABC News president Roone Arledge reformatted the program, relaunching it as World News Tonight in July 1978. Reynolds, who was demoted when the network hired Reasoner, returned as lead anchor, reporting from ABC News' Washington, D.C. bureau. Max Robinson – who became the first African American network news anchor upon his appointment on the program – anchored national news from the news division's Chicago bureau. Peter Jennings, who also returned for a second stint, reported international headlines from the division's London bureau.

Occasional contributions included special reports by Walters, who was credited as anchor of the special coverage desk from New York City and worldwide, and commentary by Smith, who was easing into eventual retirement. The program's distinct and easily identifiable theme (whose four-note musical signature was eventually used on other ABC News programs) was written by Bob Israel. Ratings slowly climbed to the point where World News Tonight eventually beat both NBC Nightly News and the CBS Evening News, marking the first time ever that ABC had the most-watched network evening newscast.

==== Peter Jennings's second solo tenure (1983–2005) ====
In April 1983, Reynolds became ill, and ABC News brought in This Week moderator David Brinkley to fill in for Reynolds. This arrangement continued until July 4; when ABC news summoned Peter Jennings to leave London and anchor from Washington, leaving both him and Robinson to co-anchor the broadcast until Reynolds' planned return. However, Reynolds died on July 20, 1983, from bone cancer. A rotation of anchors hosted the program until August 9, 1983, when ABC announced that Jennings became the sole anchor and senior editor of World News Tonight, which took effect September 5, and on that day, the program began broadcasting from New York City on a regular basis. Bill Owen would replace Bill Rice as announcer for a year.

In September 1984, the program was renamed World News Tonight with Peter Jennings to reflect its sole anchor and senior editor. Robinson left ABC News earlier in 1984, after stints of anchoring news briefs and the weekend editions of World News Tonight; he died from complications of AIDS in 1988. With Jennings as lead anchor, World News Tonight was the most-watched national newscast from February 27, 1989, to November 1, 1996, but from then on until February 2007, it placed second behind its main rival, NBC Nightly News.

In April 2005, Jennings announced that he had been diagnosed with lung cancer and, as before, other ABC News anchors, including 20/20 co-anchor Elizabeth Vargas and Good Morning America co-anchor Charles Gibson, filled in for him. Jennings died of lung cancer on August 7, 2005, at his apartment in New York City, at age 67.

The August 8, 2005, edition of the program was dedicated in memory of Jennings and looked back at his four-decade career in news. His death ended the era of the so-called "Big Three" anchors: Jennings, NBC's Tom Brokaw, and CBS's Dan Rather (the latter two had retired from their positions as the respective anchors of NBC Nightly News and the CBS Evening News within the year prior to Jennings's death). During his career, Jennings had reported from every major world capital and war zone, and from all 50 U.S. states, according to the network. Jennings was known for his ability to calmly portray events as they were happening and for his coverage of many major world events such as the September 11 attacks and the dawn of the new millennium.

As a tribute to its recently deceased anchor, ABC continued to introduce the broadcast as World News Tonight with Peter Jennings in the week following his death. Gibson anchored the broadcast the first part of the week, playing a slow arrangement of the traditional theme music in memory of Jennings; Bob Woodruff anchored the final edition of World News Tonight with Peter Jennings on August 12, 2005. That night's broadcast ended with one of Jennings's favorite pieces of music instead of the traditional theme music. Beginning on August 15, 2005, the broadcast was introduced simply as World News Tonight and it remained that way until January 2006.

==== Bob Woodruff and Elizabeth Vargas (January–May 2006) ====
The program would return to a two-anchor format, when in early December 2005, ABC News announced that Elizabeth Vargas and Bob Woodruff would be the new permanent co-anchors of World News Tonight, replacing Jennings. People in the news industry looked at the choice of Vargas and Woodruff by ABC News as the start of a new era in network television news.

The broadcast was produced live three times per day – the regular live broadcast for the Eastern and Central Time Zones, plus separate broadcasts for the Mountain and Pacific Time Zones. In addition, a live webcast, World News Now (which, incidentally, carried the same title as ABC's overnight news program), with a newsbrief and a preview of that evening's broadcast, was launched. The webcast aired live at 3:00 pm. Eastern Time on ABC News Now and ABCNews.com, and could be viewed throughout the rest of the day after 4:00 pm. Eastern Time.

On January 29, 2006, Woodruff and his cameraman, Doug Vogt, were injured by a road-side bomb while riding in an Iraqi military convoy. Both underwent surgery at a U.S. military hospital in Balad, Iraq (50 miles (80 km) north of Baghdad). Both men incurred head injuries in the incident, even though they were both wearing body armor and helmets. Woodruff and Vogt were then evacuated to a U.S. military hospital in Germany, before later being transferred to Bethesda Naval Hospital in Maryland for further treatment and released for outpatient treatment. Within a few months after Woodruff's accident, ABC News announced that Vargas was pregnant and due to give birth to her second child in late summer.

For about a month, Good Morning America co-hosts Charles Gibson and Diane Sawyer had alternated co-anchoring the newscast with Vargas. During the spring of 2006, Vargas mostly anchored the broadcast alone, becoming the first de facto solo female evening news anchor. At the time, it was unknown what ABC News planned to do until Woodruff returned to the anchor chair, which appeared not to be within the near future, and when Vargas began her maternity leave. Rumors flew that Sawyer wanted to become the sole anchor of World News Tonight to beat Katie Couric's switch to the anchor chair at the CBS Evening News. However, New York Post columnist Cindy Adams reported that Gibson would become Woodruff's "temporary permanent replacement". Also starting in early 2006, the West Coast editions of World News Tonight were scaled back because Vargas anchored the broadcast on her own at the time.

=== World News ===
==== Charles Gibson (2006–2009) ====
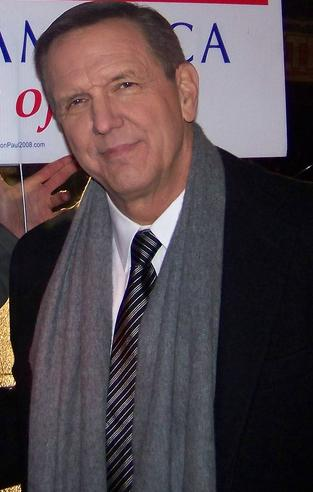
Charles Gibson anchored World News Tonight, later World News, from 2006 to 2009.

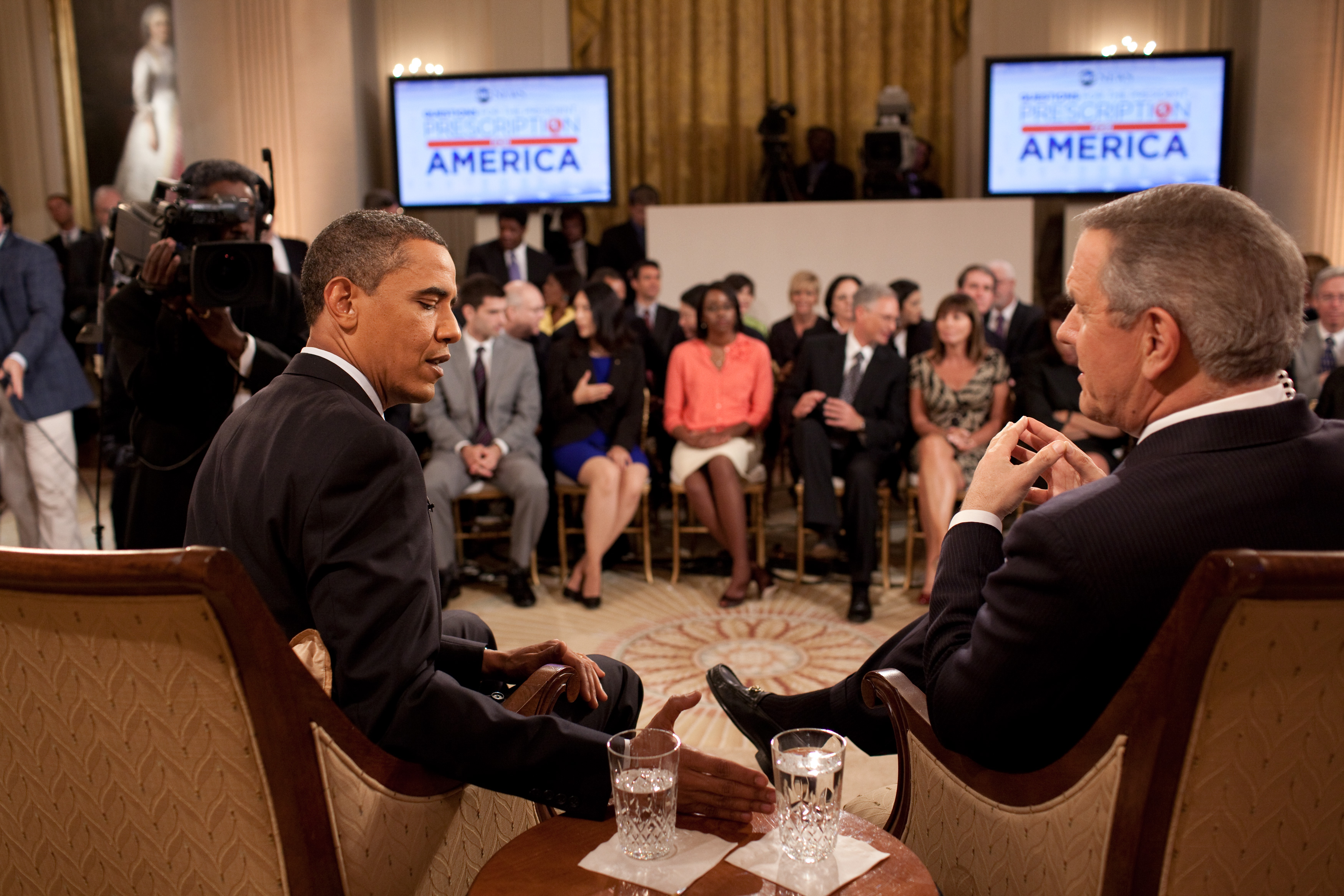
President Barack Obama with Gibson in the East Room of the White House during ABC News's Prescription for America "town-hall"-style conversation on health care, June 24, 2009.

In May 2006, Vargas announced her resignation from World News Tonight. Charles Gibson was then named sole anchor of the program, effectively replacing Vargas and her injured co-anchor Woodruff. Vargas cited her doctors' recommendation to cut back her schedule considerably because of her maternity leave, and her wish to spend more time with her new baby. She has since returned to co-anchor 20/20 and ABC News specials, and has served as a substitute anchor on World News Tonight under Gibson and his successors.

Woodruff, although still recovering from his injuries, returned to World News Tonight as a correspondent on February 28, 2007.

Some media analysts found the reasons for the appointment of Gibson as anchor to be merely a cover for ABC News's real intentions to bring stability to its flagship news program, which had seen its ratings slip, and to attract some older viewers away from the CBS Evening News with interim anchor Bob Schieffer. Indeed, the advertising campaign focused on Gibson's experience, calling him "Your Trusted Source", similar to a campaign for Jennings, "Trust Is Earned", in the wake of the Killian documents controversy at CBS and Brian Williams's assumption of the NBC anchor chair.

On July 19, 2006, ABC News announced that World News Tonight would have its name officially changed to World News with Charles Gibson. The network chose to make the, albeit minor, change to remove "Tonight" from the title to reflect the program's expansion into the "24-hour space created by the digital world".

In the February 2007 sweeps, World News with Charles Gibson achieved the number-one spot in the Nielsen ratings among the network evening news broadcasts, overtaking NBC Nightly News, marking ABC News' first victory since the week Jennings died in August 2005.

World News with Charles Gibson won the May 2007 sweeps period decisively over NBC Nightly News, marking Gibson's second consecutive sweeps win and widening the program's lead in the evening news race. It was the first time that World News had won consecutive sweeps periods since 1996, the year ABC News ceded the ratings crown to NBC Nightly News with Tom Brokaw. NBC Nightly News retook first place in the November 2007 sweeps and the two programs remained in a tight race until the fall of 2008, when the NBC program established a consistent lead.

On August 25, 2008, World News became the fourth and final network evening newscast to begin broadcasting in high definition.

On September 2, 2009, ABC News announced that Gibson would retire from ABC News altogether on December 18, 2009, and that Sawyer would assume the anchor desk on December 21, 2009. Gibson's final broadcast ended with a video tribute that included all of the living former U.S. Presidents, former ABC anchors, actors and actresses, singers, comedians, Mickey Mouse, Kermit the Frog, athletes, the commander of the International Space Station, competitors Couric and Williams, and was capped off by U.S. President Barack Obama.

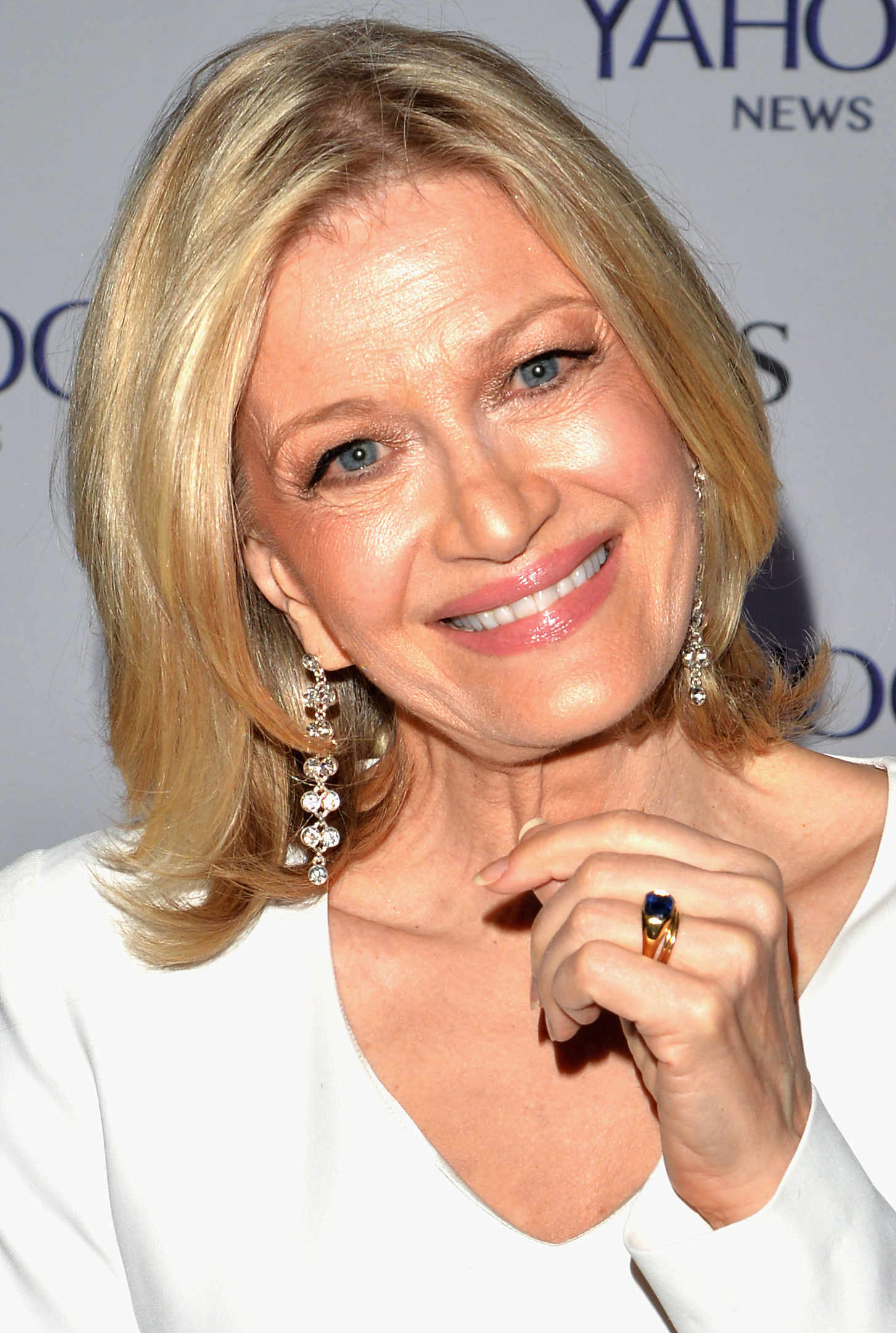
Diane Sawyer was the anchor of World News from 2009 to 2014.

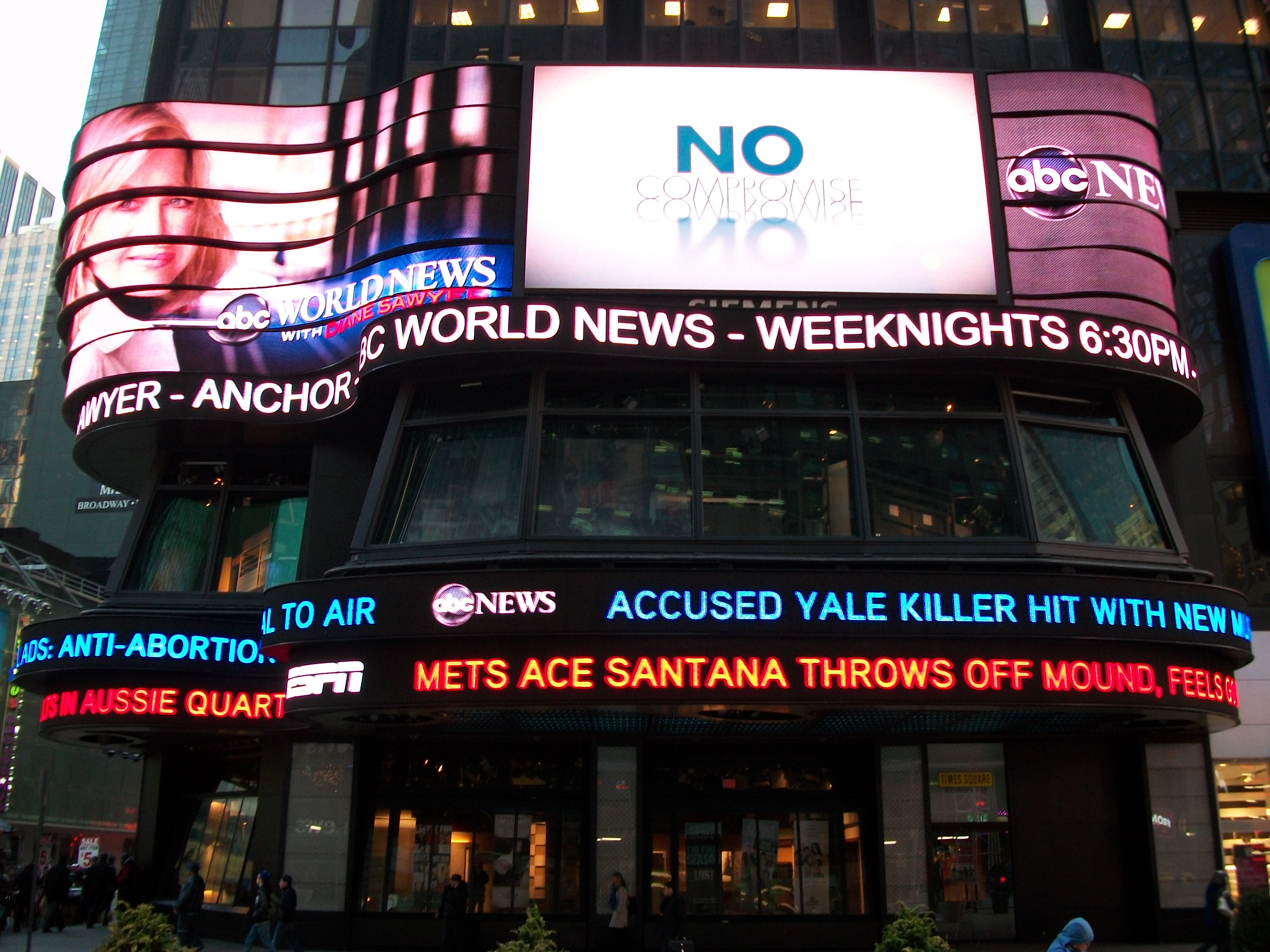
Advertisement for World News (left) outside of Times Square Studios in 2010

==== Diane Sawyer (2009–2014) ====
Long-time ABC journalist and anchorwoman Diane Sawyer (who previously co-anchored Good Morning America with predecessor Gibson) began anchoring the broadcast, which amended its title to ABC World News, on December 21, 2009. On that date, the program debuted an updated set, new graphics during the introductory segment, along with a new announcer, Mike Rowe (then host of Discovery Channel's Dirty Jobs), who replaced longtime announcer Bill Rice. A new set for the program debuted on August 23, 2010. Substitute anchors for the program during Sawyer's tenure when she was away or on assignment, in addition to Vargas, included David Muir (who by that point, anchored the weekend editions of World News and served as a weekday correspondent), George Stephanopoulos, Cynthia McFadden, Dan Harris, Paula Faris and Byron Pitts (with the exception of McFadden, who left ABC News in August 2014, most of these anchors/correspondents have also served as substitutes following Muir's appointment as anchor of the program).

The Sawyer tenure was marked by a shift towards more "news you can use" features, and less of a focus on hard international news. World News at the time had a 60% female viewership, the highest of the three major network evening newscasts.

On October 1, 2012, World News debuted a new logo, opening theme (which was composed by Hans Zimmer, replacing the longtime Bob Israel-composed theme), an updated set and new graphics package. The program also introduced a segment called the "Instant Index", a feature appearing as the penultimate segment of each night's broadcast focusing on news stories that are trending on social media, pop culture and entertainment-related stories and viral videos. Another feature introduced during Sawyer's tenure was "Made in America", a feature segment reported by David Muir, chronicling enterprising American companies.

On June 25, 2014, ABC News announced that Sawyer would step down as the weekday anchor of ABC World News; Sawyer would be succeeded by the program's then weekend anchor, David Muir, effective September 2. On July 28, 2014, the program debuted a slightly updated set, which includes a new, larger monitor behind the anchor desk. Diane Sawyer ultimately decided to end her tenure as anchor of ABC World News nearly a week before Muir began as anchor of the weeknight editions on August 27, 2014, to spend time with family. By the time Sawyer left World News, the program was the No. 1 network evening newscast in all major key demographics and significantly closed the ratings gap with NBC Nightly News in total viewership.

=== World News Tonight (second era) ===
==== David Muir (2014–present) ====
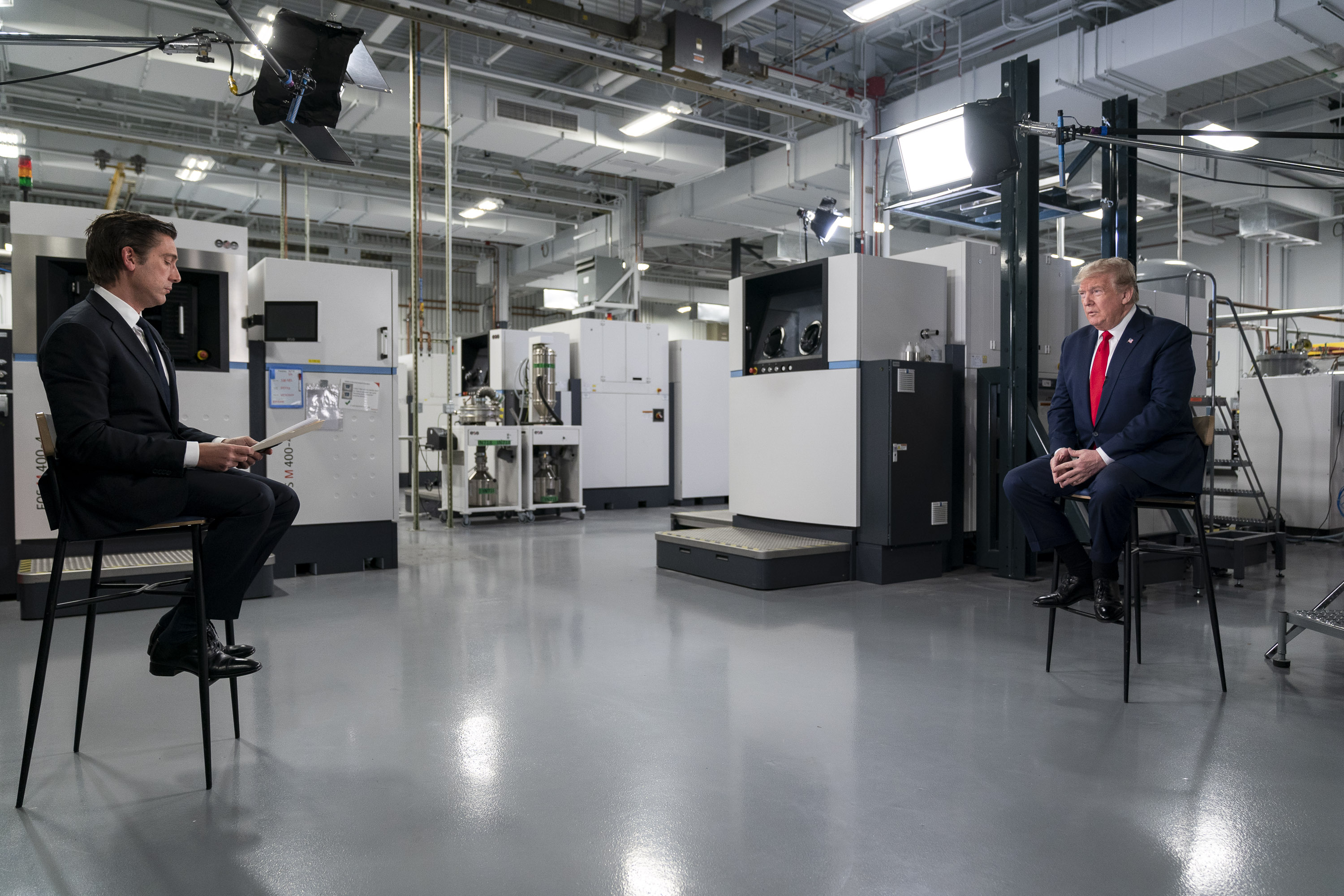
Muir interviewing President Donald Trump in 2020

David Muir became the weekday anchor and managing editor of the program on September 1, 2014, while retaining his duties as co-anchor of 20/20. At the same time, Good Morning America co-host George Stephanopoulos assumed the news division's Chief Anchor position that had traditionally been assigned to the anchor of World News. Following the departure of Diane Sawyer, the title of the program was also silently rebranded back to World News Tonight for the first time since 2006, albeit with "ABC" attached to the title. Primary substitutes are Stephanopoulos, Rebecca Jarvis, and Amy Robach.

World News Tonight has broadcast from San Bernardino, Orlando, Paris, and Brussels after terrorist attacks, and from Dallas after five policemen were shot dead in July 2016. In November 2016, World News Tonight was the most-watched network primetime newscast for the first time in 18 years. The last time World News held the top spot was during the 1998–99 season when Peter Jennings sat at the anchor's desk, according to Nielsen.

World News Tonight was the most-watched network evening newscast for the week of March 30, 2015. This marked the first time in seven years that the program finished at No. 1, beating out NBC Nightly News in all categories. On August 10, 2020, World News Tonight marked 11 consecutive weeks as "America's Most-Watched Show".

On September 8, 2020, World News Tonight debuted a new title card, reintroduced the long-time Bob Israel-composed opening theme (replacing the Hans Zimmer theme), and revealed an updated set and new graphics package.

Following the 2023 Lewiston shootings, on October 26, 2023, World News Tonight began posting full broadcasts to ABC News' YouTube channel.

On March 7, 2025, World News Tonight re-located to Disney's new campus at 7 Hudson Square, maintaining a relatively similar (albeit upgraded) studio.

== Anchors ==
=== Weekdays ===
- H. R. Baukhage and Jim Gibbons (News and Views, August 11, 1948 – March 30, 1951)
- Unknown (After the Deadlines, April 2, 1951 – October 3, 1952)
- Bryson Rash, Pauline Frederick, Gordon Fraser and Leo Cherne (All-Star News, October 6, 1952 – January 2, 1953 – primetime news, one hour Mondays and Wednesdays, half hour other nights)
- ABC network had no evening news broadcast Monday through Friday (January 5, 1953 – October 9, 1953)
- John Daly (John Daly and the News, October 12, 1953 – September 12, 1958)
- Don Goddard (ABC News, September 15, 1958 – May 8, 1959, at 7:15–7:30 (Eastern and Pacific Time), followed three hours later by John Daly and the News at 10:30–10:45 (Eastern and Pacific))
- John Daly (John Daly and the News, May 11, 1959 – December 16, 1960)
- Bill Shadel (ABC Evening Report, December 19, 1960 – September 22, 1961)
- Bill Lawrence, Al Mann and John Cameron Swayze (ABC Evening Report, September 25, 1961 – March 23, 1962, at 6 or 7, followed four or five hours later by 10-minute ABC News Final with Ron Cochran)
- Ron Cochran (ABC Evening Report, March 26, 1962 – January 29, 1965) also anchorman for 10-minute news at 11 pm until March 29, 1963; followed on the late news by Murphy Martin (April 2, 1963 – January 3, 1964) and Bob Young (January 6, 1964 – January 8, 1965)
- Peter Jennings (Peter Jennings with the News, February 1, 1965 – October 13, 1967 – program expanded to half-hour as ABC News on January 9, 1967)
- Bob Young (ABC News, October 16, 1967 – May 24, 1968)
- Frank Reynolds (ABC News, May 27, 1968 – May 16, 1969)
- Frank Reynolds and Howard K. Smith (ABC News, May 19, 1969 – December 4, 1970)
- Howard K. Smith and Harry Reasoner (ABC Evening News, December 7, 1970 – September 5, 1975)
- Harry Reasoner (ABC Evening News, September 8, 1975 – October 1, 1976)
- Harry Reasoner and Barbara Walters (ABC Evening News, October 4, 1976 – July 7, 1978)
- Frank Reynolds, Max Robinson and Peter Jennings (World News Tonight, July 10, 1978 – April 20, 1983)
- Max Robinson and Peter Jennings (World News Tonight, April 23, 1983 – August 8, 1983)
- Peter Jennings (World News Tonight with Peter Jennings, August 9, 1983 – April 5, 2005)
- Interim anchors Charles Gibson, Elizabeth Vargas and Bob Woodruff (World News Tonight with Peter Jennings, April 6, 2005 – August 12, 2005; World News Tonight, August 15, 2005 – January 2, 2006)
- Bob Woodruff and Elizabeth Vargas (World News Tonight with Bob Woodruff and Elizabeth Vargas, January 3 – May 26, 2006)
- Charles Gibson (World News with Charles Gibson, May 29, 2006 – December 18, 2009)
- Diane Sawyer (ABC World News with Diane Sawyer, December 21, 2009 – August 27, 2014)
- David Muir (ABC World News Tonight with David Muir, since September 1, 2014)

=== Weekends ===
- Ted Koppel (Saturday edition, 1975–1977)
- Tom Jarriel and Sylvia Chase (Saturday edition, 1977–1979)
- Sam Donaldson (Sunday edition, 1979–1989)
- Kathleen Sullivan (Saturday edition, 1985–1987)
- Charles Gibson (Saturday edition, 1987)
- Barry Serafin (Saturday edition, 1987–1988)
- Carole Simpson (Saturday edition, 1988–1993; weekends, 1993–2003)
- Forrest Sawyer (Sunday edition, 1989–1993)
- Aaron Brown (Saturday edition, 1993–1997)
- Elizabeth Vargas (Saturday edition, 1997–2003; Sunday edition, 2003–2004)
- Terry Moran (Sunday edition, 2004–2005)
- Bob Woodruff (Saturday edition, 2004–2005)
- Jim Avila (Saturday edition, 2006–2007)
- Dan Harris (Sunday edition, 2006–2011)
- David Muir (Saturday edition, 2007–2011; weekends, 2011–2014)
- Cecilia Vega (Saturday edition, 2015–2017)
- Tom Llamas (Sunday edition, 2015–2017; weekends, 2017–2021, now at NBC News)
- Whit Johnson (Saturday edition, 2021–present)
- Linsey Davis (Sunday edition, 2021–present)

== Weekend newscasts ==
ABC World News Tonight
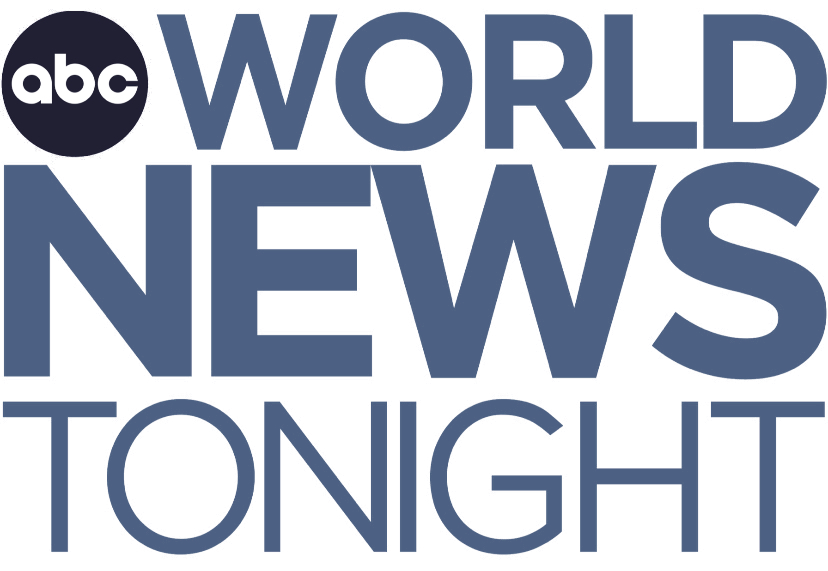
- Genre: Weekend news show
- Presented by: Whit Johnson (Saturday); Linsey Davis (Sunday)
- Country of origin: United States
- Original language: English

Production
- Production location: New York City
- Camera setup: Multi-camera
- Running time: 30 minutes

Original release
- Network: ABC
- Release: July 5, 1975 – present

ABC first attempted an early evening weekend newscast in July 1975, when it debuted a Saturday bulletin that was anchored by Ted Koppel and taken over by Tom Jarriel and Sylvia Chase in 1977. The broadcast, however, was not carried by many stations, and was cancelled in January 1979.

Following the Saturday news cancellation, and after the flagship weeknight broadcast became World News Tonight, the program premiered World News Sunday on January 28, 1979, and expanded to a full seven days with the restoration of a Saturday newscast (World News Saturday) on January 5, 1985, years after NBC and CBS had each launched their own weekend evening news programs. These editions added the word "Tonight" to the program title in the mid-1990s, further unifying it with the weekday editions, and in the mid-2000s, their respective names were shortened uniformly to World News Tonight to correspond with those broadcasts. However, the original names were restored on July 19, 2006, concurrent with the retitling of the weekday broadcasts, but the opening title sequence displayed the name as World News for both the Saturday and Sunday editions.

Prior to 1975, the only network newscasts that ABC stations broadcast on weekends were 15-minute late-night updates on Saturdays and Sundays, known as ABC Weekend News and later, ABC News Weekend Report. The programs were fed to affiliates at 11:00 pm Eastern/10:00 pm Central and were seen in tandem with the stations' own late newscasts, although some stations opted to tape-delay the network updates until immediately before their regular sign-off time (rival CBS also offered a 15-minute Sunday night bulletin during the 1970s until 1997). Because of declining affiliate interest (in part because of the proliferation of 24-hour cable news channels such as CNN) and low viewership, ABC discontinued the late-night weekend reports in September 1991.

In addition, starting in 1973, weeknight co-anchor Harry Reasoner hosted The Reasoner Report, a half-hour topical analysis of important stories (especially breaking developments in the Watergate scandal) in the vein of CBS's 60 Minutes, which Reasoner himself co-moderated at two different times. Affiliates usually carried the program on Saturday evenings in the time slots where the main newscast aired on weeknights. In addition, starting in 1973, weeknight co-anchor Harry Reasoner hosted The Reasoner Report, a half-hour newsmagazine program featuring analysis and commentary on major news stories. The program was cancelled in 1975.(see above).

Some former anchors of the weekend news broadcasts include Sam Donaldson (Sunday edition, 1979–1989), Kathleen Sullivan (Saturday edition, 1985–1987), Barry Serafin (Saturday edition, 1987–1988), Forrest Sawyer (Sunday edition, 1989–1993), Carole Simpson (Saturday edition, 1988–1993; Sunday edition, 1993–2003), Elizabeth Vargas (Saturday edition, 1997–2003; Sunday edition, 2003–2004), Jim Avila (Saturday edition, 2006–2007), Terry Moran (Saturday edition, 2004–2005), Bob Woodruff (Sunday edition, 2004–2005), Dan Harris (Sunday edition, 2006–2011) and David Muir (Saturday edition, 2007–2011; Saturday and Sunday editions, 2011–2014). Muir, who had taken over World News Saturday in 2007, took over the Sunday broadcast in 2011, ending the practice of using separate anchors for the Saturday and Sunday editions of the program, with ABC renaming both broadcasts as ABC World News with David Muir as a result. David Muir anchored the weekend program until he took over the weekday broadcast in September 2014. The program returned to using separate anchors for the weekend broadcasts afterward, with Cecilia Vega being named anchor of the Saturday broadcast and Tom Llamas named anchor of the Sunday edition in February 2015. After Vega was named senior White House correspondent, Llamas was named sole weekend anchor in January 2017, as the practice of using separate anchors for the Saturday and Sunday editions ended once again. Llamas subsequently left in January 2021, to join NBC News. In February 2021, Whit Johnson and Linsey Davis were announced as anchors of the weekend edition, with Johnson anchoring on Saturday and Davis anchoring on Sunday.

Some ABC affiliates air the Saturday and Sunday editions of World News Tonight at 6:00 p.m. Eastern and Pacific Time (5:00 p.m. Central and Mountain)‍—‌one half-hour earlier than the weekday broadcasts. The weekend editions of World News Tonight may periodically be abbreviated or preempted outright due to sports telecasts that overrun into its timeslot or occasionally air immediately following the program (the latter preemption situation commonly affects stations in the Pacific and Mountain Time Zones); this is particularly common during fall, as the Saturday broadcast does not air at all from September through mid December due to ABC's college football coverage and during the winter and spring, when the Sunday broadcast is sometimes delayed or preempted due to overruns of the network's NBA telecasts.

== International newscasts ==
ABC News programs, including ABC World News Tonight, are shown for several hours a day on the 24-hour news network OSN News in MENA Region.

Various cable companies in the Caribbean previously simulcasted ABC World News Tonight from then-Miami affiliate WPLG. Similarly, cable companies in Canada simulcast the program with most airing from either Seattle-based KOMO, Boston-based WCVB, or Detroit-based WXYZ which operate as timeshift channels.

In the United Kingdom, the program was shown Tuesday through Fridays at 1:30 a.m. on BBC News, a channel that is frequently simulcast by BBC One at this time, meaning the program was broadcast on analogue terrestrial television in many parts of that country until the digital transition. The newscast was aired on a delay, in part because of the need to remove commercial advertisements, as the BBC's domestic channels operate as commercial-free services via a television license fee, replacing them with promotions for different BBC News special programs. The program was replaced by Asia Business Report and Sport Today on June 14, 2011, but later returned to the channel on August 20, 2012. It was also available on the BBC's on-demand service BBC iPlayer for 28 days after its domestic broadcast. The program was replaced again by Asia Business Report and Sport Today on March 30, 2015.

In Australia, WNT was aired every morning at 10:30 am. AET on Sky News Australia until it was moved to SBS and SBS Viceland in July 2019. WNT previously broadcast on New Zealand-based TVNZ Duke.

In Hong Kong, the program was broadcast live on TVB Pearl daily at 07:30 until 08:00 HKT until May 31, 2009, when it was replaced by NBC Nightly News.

In Japan, it airs on NHK BS 1 as part of the weekday morning program Catch! Sekai no Top News (Catch the Global Top News) and later on World News, and in clip form during the English language educational program Kōryaku! ABC News Eigo (Strategies! ABC News English) until its end in March 2021.

In Belize, Great Belize Television carries all editions of World News Tonight each weekday at 8:00 p.m. and weekends at 7:00 p.m.

== Radio broadcast ==
Fargo-based radio station WDAY-AM simulcasts the weekday version of the program from local ABC affiliate WDAY/KBMY/WDAZ/KMCY.
