= Harry Reasoner =

American journalist (1923–1991)

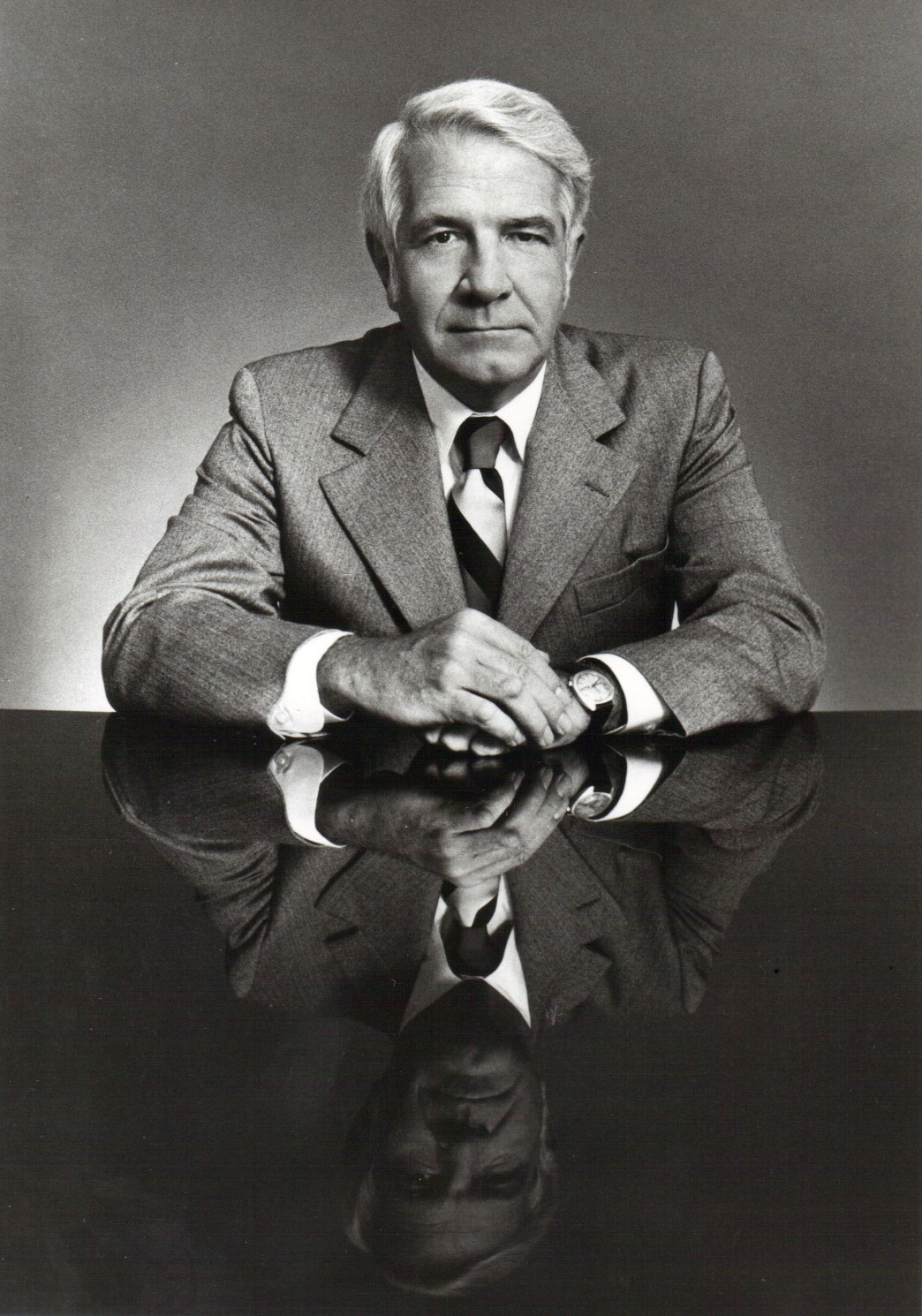
- Harry Reasoner, 1974
- Born: April 17, 1923; Dakota City, Iowa, U.S.
- Died: August 6, 1991 (aged 68); Westport, Connecticut, US
- Education: Stanford University; University of Minnesota
- Occupation: Journalist
- Years active: 1946–1991
- Spouses: Kathleen Carroll Reasoner (m. 1946; died 1986) Lois Harriett Weber (m. 1988)
- Children: 7

Harry Reasoner (April 17, 1923 – August 6, 1991) was an American journalist for CBS and ABC News. He is known for his adroit use of language as a television commentator and as one of the original hosts of the news magazine 60 Minutes (1968–1970, 1978–1991).

Over the course of his career, Reasoner won three Emmy Awards and a George Foster Peabody Award in 1967.

== Early life ==
Reasoner was born on First Street North in Dakota City, Iowa; he and his older sister, Esther, were the children of Eunice (Nicholl) and Harry Ray Reasoner, who married in 1911. Harry Reasoner was taught to read by his parents before entering school, gaining a broad vocabulary from his mother.

Reasoner attended West High School in Minneapolis, where he developed an interest in journalism. He authored a story titled "The Wench of the Week," which garnered the attention of the principal, who expelled Reasoner, but later let him return following a plea from a fellow student. Reasoner graduated in January 1940, having missed the 1939 class graduation ceremony. He studied journalism at Stanford University and the University of Minnesota, receiving a journalism degree from the latter's School of Journalism in 1989 at the age of 66. Reasoner served in the Army during World War II and after the war, he resumed his journalism career with The Minneapolis Times. His novel Tell Me About Women, about a fading marriage, was written partly during his war service and was first published in 1946.

== Journalism ==
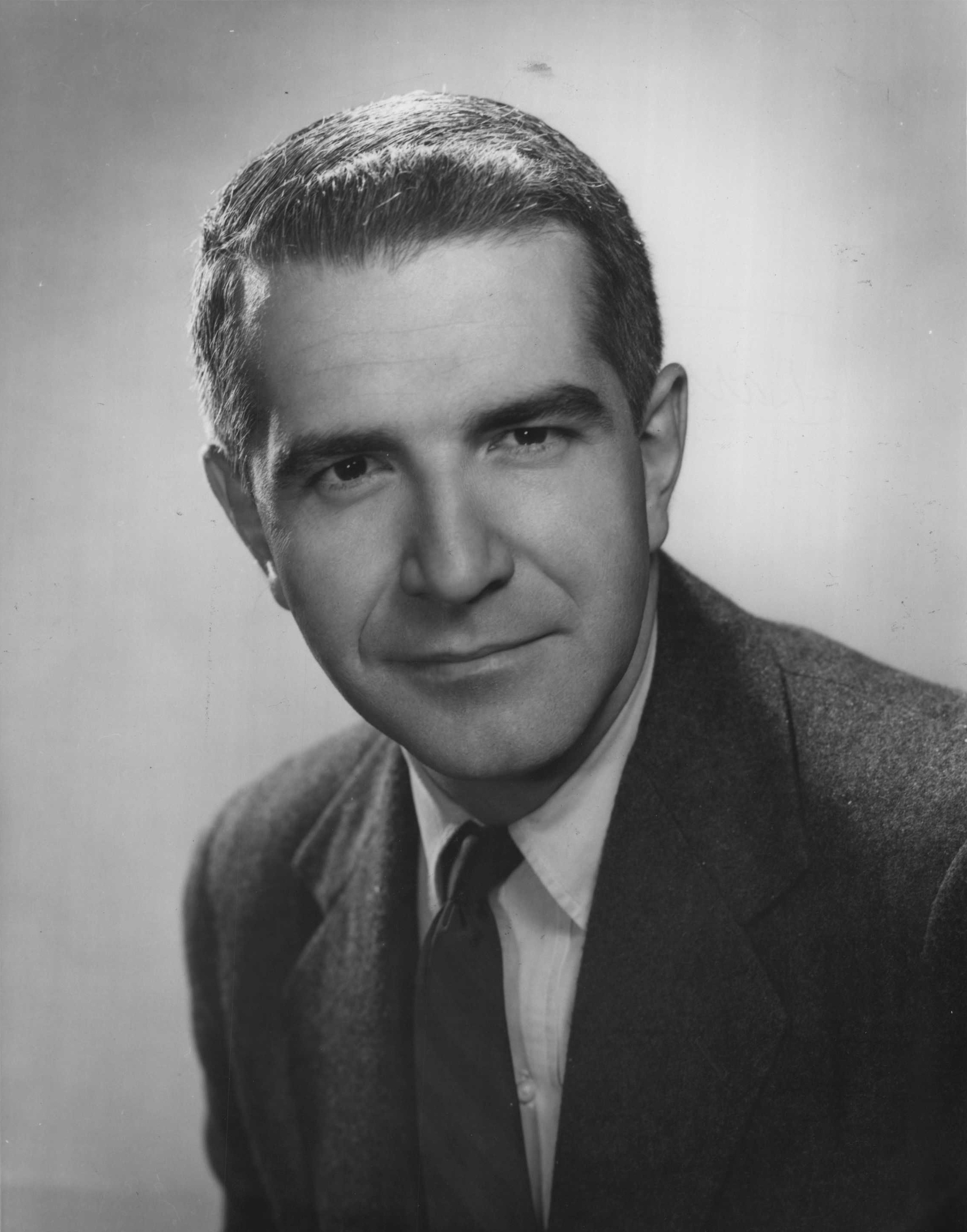
Reasoner as an employee of the United States Information Agency

After beginning to work in radio with CBS in 1948, Reasoner worked for the United States Information Agency in the Philippines. When he returned to the US, he transitioned into working in television while at station KEYD (later KMSP) in Minneapolis. He ran for city council in Minneapolis as a Republican in 1949 receiving 381 votes (4.4 percent). In 1956, Reasoner joined CBS News in New York. There in addition to commentator and special news narration duties, he eventually hosted a morning news program, Calendar, from 1961 to 1963.

=== JFK assassination ===
Reasoner took part in covering the John F. Kennedy assassination on Friday, November 22, 1963. Walter Cronkite and Charles Collingwood had been switching back and forth to report on the incident for about four hours after Cronkite broke the news at 1:40 p.m. EST. Reasoner took over the anchor chair after Collingwood tossed it to him at 5:49 p.m. EST and opened with the repeat of an announcement by Frank Stanton, the president of CBS, which had already been relayed by Collingwood:

Thank you, Charles. As you know, CBS has announced that there will be no commercial announcements and no entertainment programming until President Kennedy's funeral.

He later reported on the arrival of President Kennedy's body in Washington, D.C., and provided details regarding Lee Harvey Oswald, who was then accused only of killing Dallas Police Officer J. D. Tippit; Oswald would be accused of killing the president only hours later. Reasoner left the desk when Cronkite returned to anchor CBS Evening News at 6:35 p.m. EST. He reappeared in another studio, approximately two hours later, to narrate a special program called John F. Kennedy—A Man of This Century; he talked about Kennedy's career and the new president, Lyndon B. Johnson, and announced the conclusion of CBS's coverage for that day. (Reasoner also anchored the final coverage of the next day, with a CBS News special, titled A Day to Mourn.)

Reasoner's next appearance came on Sunday, two days later, and as Reasoner was at the anchor desk, Oswald was shot by Jack Ruby while he was being moved in the Dallas City Jail. At that very moment, Roger Mudd was filing a report from Washington which described the President's funeral arrangements:

Tomorrow there will be a final hour for the public to pay their final respects to the President before the President leaves Capitol Hill for the last time. The last soldier, milit—

At that moment, CBS abruptly cut back to Reasoner at the newsroom anchor desk with breaking news:

We are now switching to Dallas where they're about to move Lee Oswald, and where there's a scuffle in the police station.

When CBS picked up KRLD's live feed of the city jail basement, Oswald was lying on the floor, and Dallas Police were apprehending Ruby. KRLD's reporter on the scene, Bob Huffaker, was heard to say, "Oswald has been shot, Oswald has been shot." After the ambulance carrying Oswald sped out of the jail en route to Parkland Hospital, KRLD switched back to CBS in New York, where Reasoner replayed the tape from the beginning so that viewers could see Ruby shooting Oswald. Several minutes later, he reported that the Dallas Police had released Ruby's name. (Oswald's death was later announced by Cronkite, who replaced Reasoner at the anchor desk.)

=== 60 Minutes ===
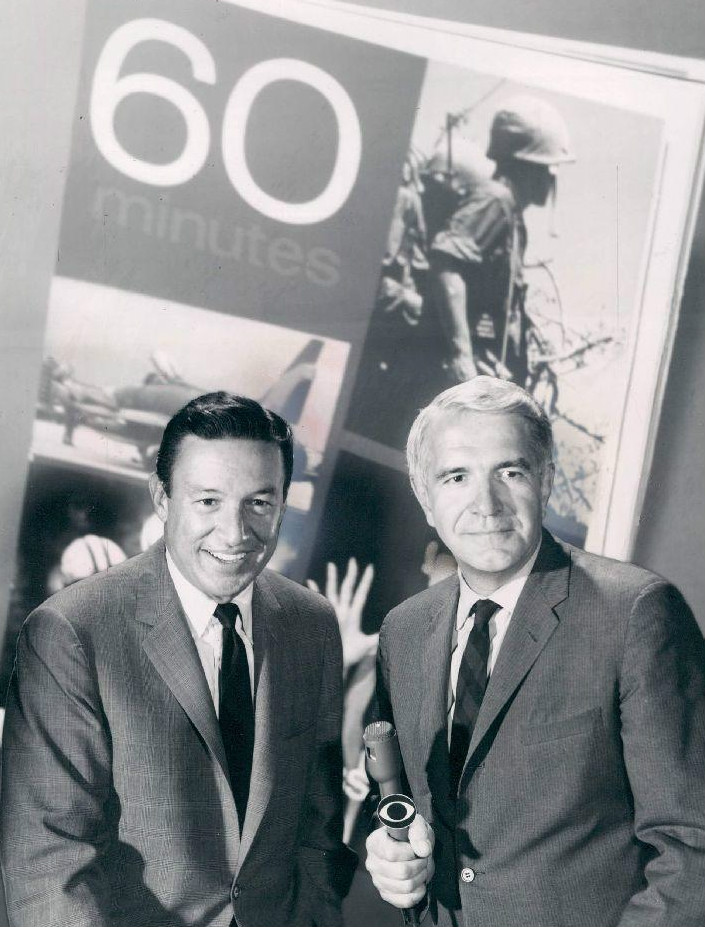
Reasoner and Mike Wallace on the 60 Minutes premiere, 1968

In 1968, Reasoner teamed up with Mike Wallace to launch 60 Minutes, a new newsmagazine series. On 60 Minutes and elsewhere, he often worked with producer and writer Andy Rooney, who later became a well-known contributor. In a farewell interview on 60 Minutes in 2011, Rooney said Reasoner was a great writer in his own right but was lazy, which gave Rooney more opportunities to show his writing skills. Rooney and interviewer Morley Safer agreed that Reasoner enjoyed drinking and was "one of the most companionable fellows" they had ever known.

=== To ABC and back ===
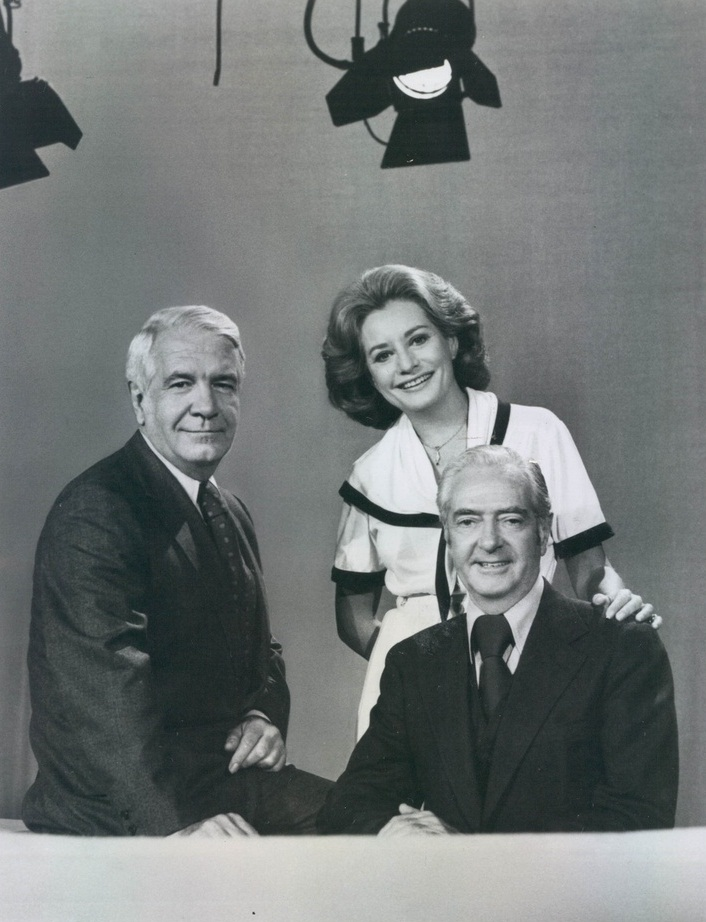
Reasoner with fellow ABC News anchors Barbara Walters and Howard K. Smith in 1976

In November 1970, Reasoner was hired away from CBS by ABC to become an anchor on the network's evening newscast. Prior to his hire, the network's New York-based broadcast, ABC Evening News, was anchored by Howard K. Smith and Frank Reynolds, and in December 1970, Reasoner was moved into Reynolds' position (and Reynolds became the network's chief Washington correspondent).

Reasoner anchored the news alongside Smith until 1975, when he took the sole anchor position while Smith moved into a commentary role. The next year, however, ABC paired Reasoner with a new co-anchor, former Today Show co-host Barbara Walters; ABC had gone to great lengths to hire her away from NBC. Walters and Reasoner did not enjoy a close relationship; Reasoner did not like sharing the spotlight with a co-anchor and also was uncomfortable with Walters' celebrity status. Many also believed that Reasoner disliked the idea of a woman anchoring the network news; one woman at ABC told a reporter that he was a "male chauvinist pig." He had a history of antifeminist editorializing on air. For example, on the December 21, 1971 newscast, he compared the newly launched feminist Ms. magazine to tabloid journalism and pornography, claiming that although the "girls" composing it were prettier than other "shock" publishers, their work had no value.

Disclaiming gender bias against Barbara Walters, however, Reasoner said he was "trying to keep an open mind about it." In another interview, Reasoner said, "I've worked in journalism for women and with women for years. For two years I did a CBS morning news program with a woman. I feel they're no worse than men are."

After two years of co-anchoring ABC Evening News with Walters, Reasoner departed the network after nearly eight years in July 1978 and returned to CBS that fall, where he resumed his duties on 60 Minutes. Shortly after his departure ABC scrapped ABC Evening News altogether and reworked the newscast into World News Tonight.

Reasoner stayed with 60 Minutes until his retirement, on May 19, 1991.

== Personal life ==
Reasoner was married twice, first to Kathleen Carroll Reasoner for 35 years until her death in 1986, and then to insurance executive Lois Harriett Weber in 1988. He had seven children by his first marriage: Harry Stuart, Ann, Elizabeth, Jane, Mary Ray, Ellen, and Jonathan. He had six grandchildren: Leslie, Ryan, Samantha, Christian, Ian, and John. Harry Reasoner had two operations for lung cancer, in 1987 and 1989.

== Death ==
Reasoner died within three months of his retirement in 1991 from a blood clot in the brain, resulting from a fall at his home in Westport, Connecticut. He is interred at Union Cemetery in Humboldt, Iowa.

== Bibliography ==
- Reasoner, Harry (1946). Tell Me About Women (A novel). A. S. Barnes & Company Inc.
- Reasoner, Harry (1966). The Reasoner Report. Doubleday & Company Inc.
- Reasoner, Harry (1981). Before the Colors Fade. New York: Alfred A. Knopf. ISBN 9780394504803. (Autobiography)
- Daniel, Douglass K. (2007). Harry Reasoner: A Life in the News. Austin, Texas: University of Texas Press. ISBN 9780292782365.

Media offices
Preceded by Howard K. Smith and Frank Reynolds; As ABC News	ABC Evening News anchor 1970 – 1978 with Howard K. Smith 1970 – 1976 with Barbara Walters 1976 – 1978	Succeeded by Frank Reynolds, Max Robinson, and Peter Jennings as World News Tonight
