= John Charles Daly =

American journalist and game show host (1914–1991)

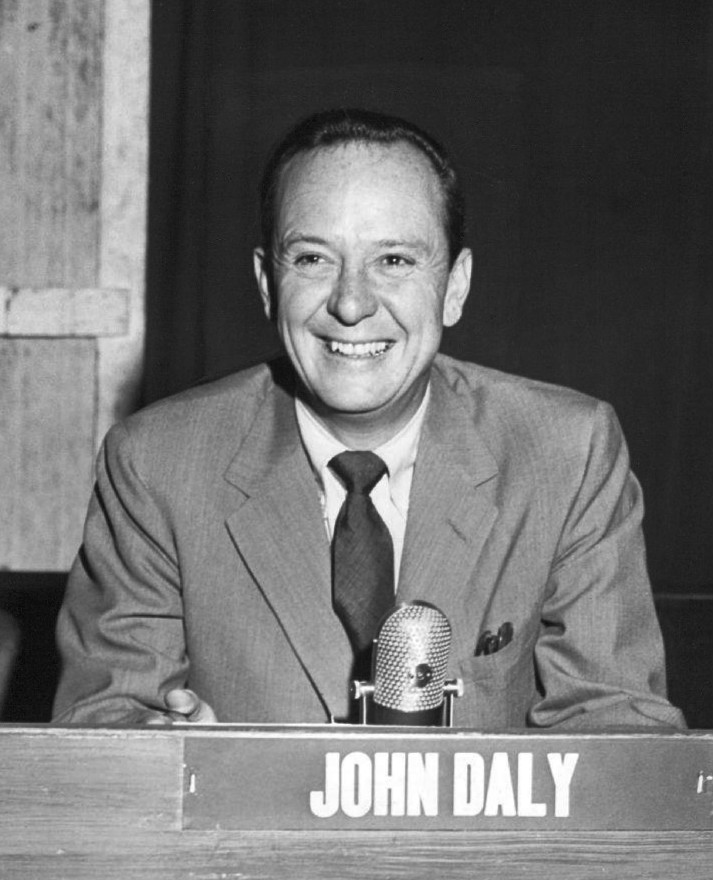
- Daly as the host of It's News to Me in 1952
- Born: John Charles Patrick Croghan Daly; February 20, 1914; Johannesburg, South Africa
- Died: February 24, 1991 (aged 77); Chevy Chase, Maryland, US
- Other name: John Daly
- Education: Boston College
- Occupations: Reporter, newscaster Game show host
- Years active: 1937–1987
- Spouses: Margaret Criswell Neal (m. 1937; div. 1959) Virginia Warren (m. 1960)
- Children: 6

John Charles Patrick Croghan Daly (February 20, 1914 – February 24, 1991) was an American journalist, host, CBS radio and television personality, ABC News executive, TV anchor, and game show host, best known for his work on the CBS panel game show What's My Line?

Daly was the first national correspondent to report the attack on Pearl Harbor and the death of Franklin D. Roosevelt. During World War II, Daly covered front-line news from Europe and North Africa.

== Early life ==
Daly was born in Johannesburg, South Africa in 1914, where his American father, John Daly Sr., was working as a geologist. After his father died of tropical fever, Daly's Irish-born mother, a British citizen, moved the family to Boston, Massachusetts. At that time, John was 11 years old. He attended the Tilton School, where he later served on the board of directors for many years, contributing to the construction or restoration of many buildings on campus. He did his post-secondary education at a junior college and graduated from Boston College. Daly worked for a time in a wool factory, and at a transit company in Washington, D.C., before becoming a reporter for NBC Radio, and later for CBS.

== Career ==
=== Radio ===
Daly began his broadcasting career as a reporter for NBC Radio and then WJSV, the local CBS Radio Network affiliate in Washington, D.C., as CBS' White House correspondent. He appears on the famous "One Day in Radio" tapes of September 21, 1939, in which WJSV preserved its entire broadcast day for posterity. In this presentation, Daly has a mid-morning show as a man-on-the-street reporter asking quiz questions of passersby.

While covering the Roosevelt White House, Daly became known to the national CBS audience as the network announcer for many of the President's speeches. In late 1941, Daly transferred to New York City, where he became anchor of The World Today. During World War II, he covered the news from London as well as the North African and Italian fronts. Daly was a war correspondent in 1943 in Italy during Gen. George S. Patton's infamous "slapping incidents." After the war, he was a lead reporter on CBS Radio's news/entertainment program CBS Is There (later revived for television as the Walter Cronkite-hosted series You Are There), which recreated the great events of history as if CBS correspondents were on the scene.

==== Notable broadcasts ====
As a reporter for the CBS radio network, Daly was the voice of two historic announcements. He was the first national correspondent to deliver the news of the attack on Pearl Harbor on Sunday, December 7, 1941, and he was also the first to relay the wire service report of the death of President Franklin D. Roosevelt on April 12, 1945, interrupting the program Wilderness Road to deliver the news. Those bulletins have been preserved on historical record album retrospectives and radio and television documentaries.

In July 1959, along with the Associated Press writer John Scali, Daly reported from Moscow on the infamous Kitchen Debate between First Secretary Nikita Khrushchev and Vice President Richard M. Nixon.

=== Television ===
Daly's first foray into television was as a panelist on the game show Celebrity Time. This led to a job in 1950 as the host and moderator on a new panel show produced by Goodson–Todman, What's My Line? The show lasted 17 years, with Daly hosting all but four episodes of the weekly series.

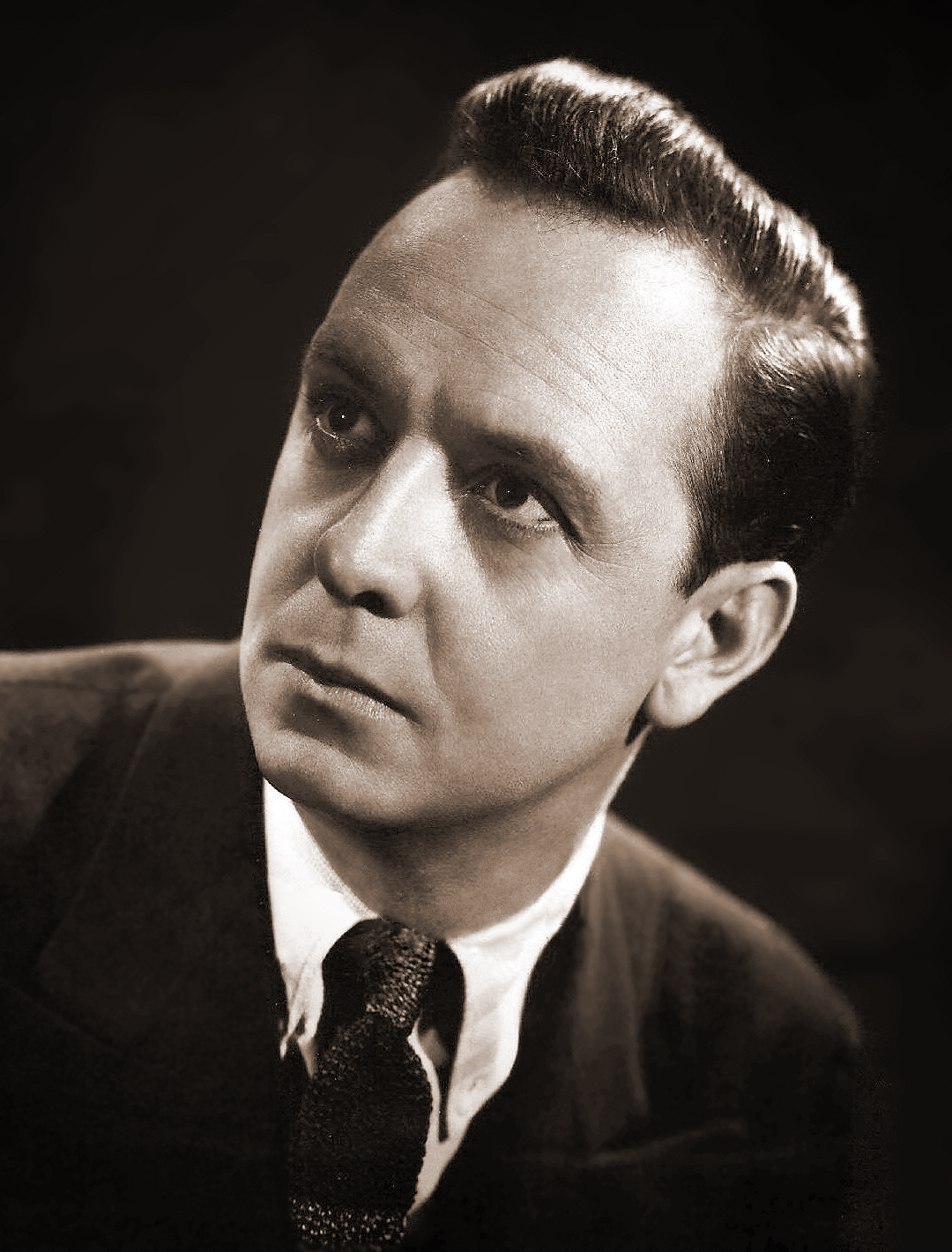
Moderator John Daly in CBS publicity photo for What's My Line? (1950)

Each What's My Line? panelist introduced the next in line at the start of the show. On Fred Allen's death in 1956, Random House book publisher and humorist Bennett Cerf became the anchor panelist who would usually introduce Daly. Cerf usually prefaced his introduction with a pun or joke that over time became a pun or joke at Daly's expense. Daly would then often fire back his own retort. Cerf and Daly enjoyed a friendly feud from across the stage for the remainder of the history of the program. The mystery guest on the final CBS program (aired September 3, 1967) was Daly himself. Daly had received many letters over the years asking him to fill that role; until the finale he never could, because Daly served as the "emergency mystery guest" in case the scheduled celebrity failed to show on the live program.

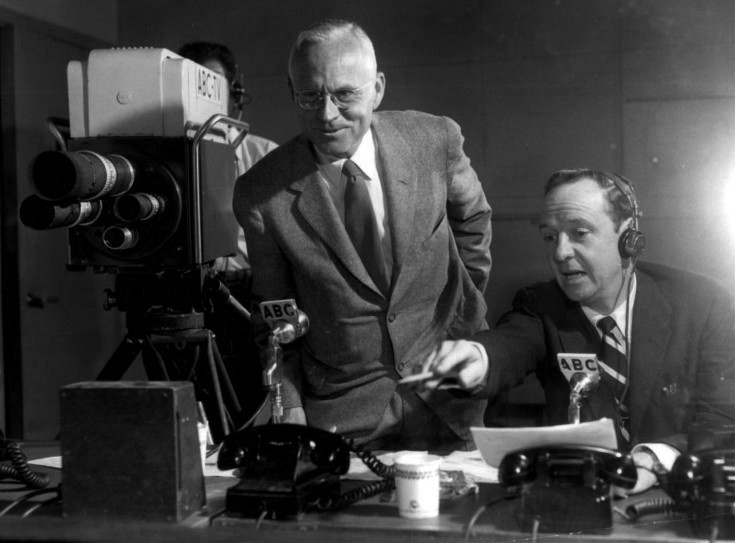
Daly and fellow broadcaster Quincy Howe providing 1952 Presidential convention coverage for ABC News

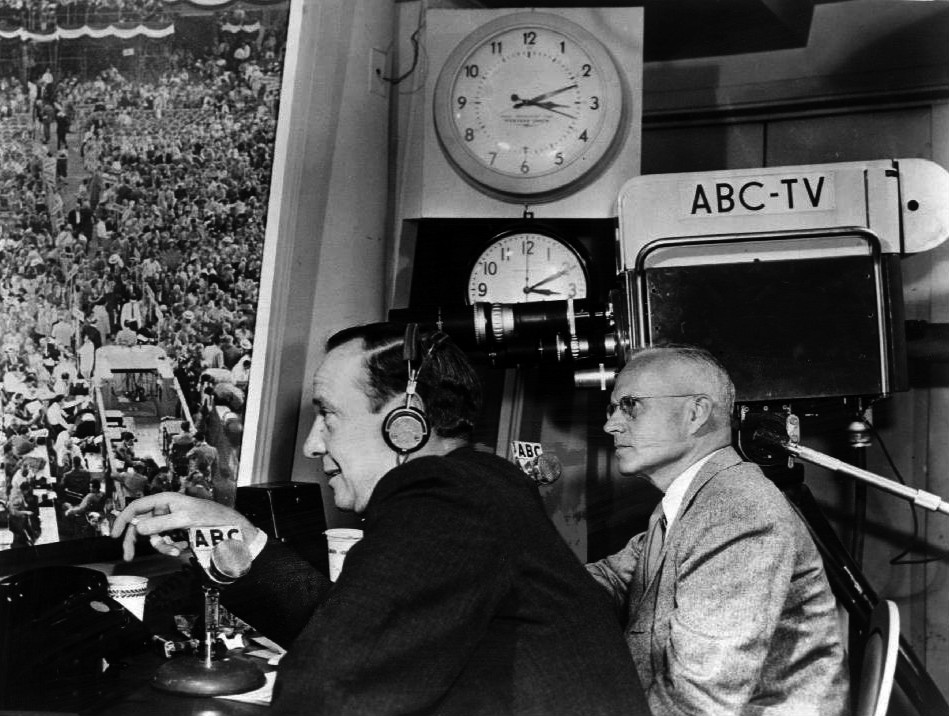
Daly and Howe proving 1952 presidential convention coverage for ABC News

According to producer Gil Fates, Daly was resistant to changes that would have diminished the show's dignity. Daly insisted on a formal procedure; for example, he addressed the panelists as "Miss" or "Mister", and both Daly and the panelists always wore formal attire in keeping with the moderator's scholarly bearing. Toward the end of the network run, in the mid-1960s, Fates broached the idea of expanding the usual format to include playful, on-stage demonstrations of the contestants' products or services, for the sake of variety, only to be met with Daly's "Look, kiddo. If you want to do stuff like this, do it on I've Got a Secret." The producers, Fates said, were unable to challenge Daly for fear of losing him as the show's moderator, and the format remained sedentary with Daly presiding from his desk. Only after Daly's departure was Fates able to expand the format, when the retooled What's My Line? was revived for syndication in 1968.

The series spawned a brief radio version in 1952, also hosted by Daly. The series also inspired a multitude of concurrent international versions and a syndicated U.S. revival in 1968 in which Daly did not participate. He was a vice president at ABC during the 1950s. He did hosting duties on Who Said That?, It's News to Me, We Take Your Word, and Open Hearing. Daly was a narrator on The Voice of Firestone starting in 1958.

He also had several television and movie guest appearances from the late 1940s to the mid-1960s, including an uncredited role in Bye Bye Birdie (as the reporter announcing the title character's induction into the Army) and as the narrator, in a mock documentary style, on the premiere episode of the rural comedy series Green Acres. In 1949 he starred in the short-lived CBS Television newspaper drama The Front Page, where it was thought that his presence and journalistic experience would give the series more authenticity.

During the 1950s, Daly became the vice president in charge of news, special events, and public affairs, religious programs and sports for ABC and won three Peabody Awards. From 1953 to 1960, he anchored John Daly and the News each weeknight and other ABC News broadcasts and was the face of the network's news division, even though What's My Line? was then on competing CBS. In addition, he provided the voice of a Conelrad radio announcer on the May 18, 1954, broadcast of The Motorola Television Hour on ABC titled Atomic Attack, which showcases a story about a family in a New York City suburb dealing with the aftermath of an H-bomb attack fifty miles away. At the time, this was a very rare instance of a television personality working on two different US broadcast TV networks simultaneously. (Daly did not work for CBS but for the producers of What's My Line?, Goodson-Todman Productions. He also filled in occasionally on NBC's The Today Show, making Daly one of the few people to work simultaneously on all three networks.)

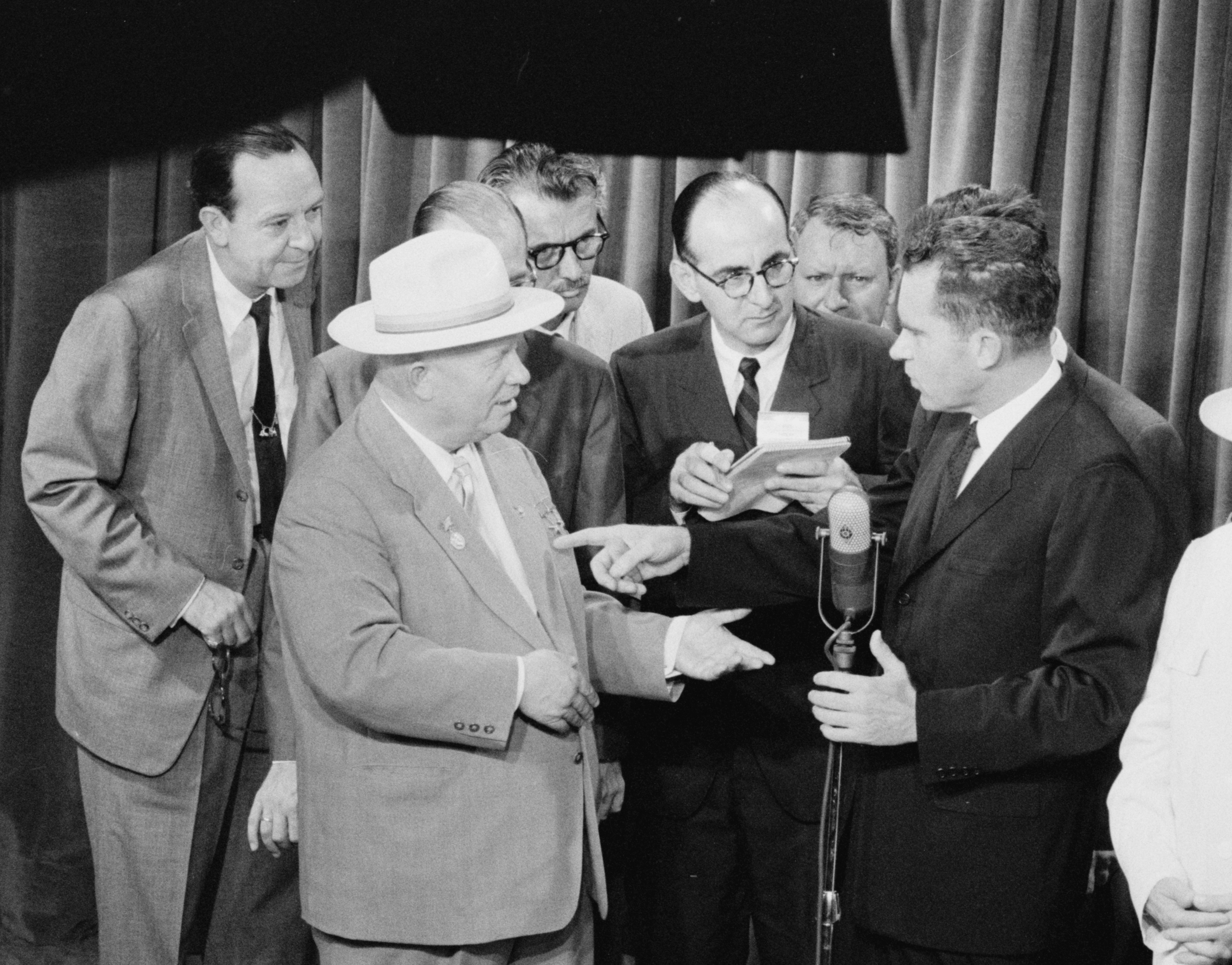
Nikita Khrushchev and Richard Nixon speak as the press looks on at the Kitchen Debate, July 24, 1959, with Daly at far left.

One of his most memorable days as host of NBC's Today Show was when Harpo Marx was a guest promoting his book Harpo Speaks. Marx caused chaos on-camera for Daly. Daly became completely convulsed in laughter during the live telecast on the NBC network.

In addition to the Harpo Marx segment and most of the live telecasts of “What’s My Line?” preserved via kinescope, at least a few of Daly's 15-minute live newscasts for the ABC network survive.

Daly's closing line on the ABC newscasts was "Good night, and a good tomorrow." He resigned from ABC on November 16, 1960, after the network preempted the first hour of 1960 presidential election night coverage to show Bugs Bunny cartoons and The Rifleman from 7:30 to 8:30 pm while CBS and NBC were covering returns from the Kennedy–Nixon presidential election and other important vote counts. Daly stated that "the last straw" that led to his resignation was the decision of the then-president of ABC, Leonard Goldenson, to bring in Time Inc. to co-produce documentaries that had previously been under Daly's direction for the network.

In May 1967, during the final year of What's My Line?, it was announced that Daly would become the director of the Voice of America after the show ended. He assumed the position on September 20, 1967, but lasted only until June 6, 1968, when he resigned over a claim that Leonard H. Marks, his superior at the U.S. Information Agency, had been making personnel changes behind Daly's back.

”The First Family” President Kennedy impersonator Vaughn Meader's appearance as the mystery guest on CBS Television's What’s My Line? the evening of the 1962 NFL Championship Game, December 30, 1962. John Daly is on the right.

From December 1968 to January 1969, Daly hosted the arts and humanities program "Critique" on NET. Funded by the National Endowment for the Humanities, the Old Dominion Foundation (later the Andrew W. Mellon Foundation), and the Louis Calder Foundation (paper industry leader), “Critique” was originally scheduled for 26 weekly programs. However, Daly resigned after only five programs because the producing station of the program, Newark, New Jersey-licensed WNDT, declined to delete a remark by WCBS radio reporter David Goldman that Daly considered obscene from a taped program in the series titled "Huui, Huui," an opening production of the New York Shakespeare Festival Public Theater. The most notable and last guest on a "Critique" program hosted by Daly was Bronx-born singer/songwriter/pianist Laura Nyro, probably recorded on December 4, 1968, and originally broadcast on January 1, 1969, in which she performed demos of "And When I Die," "The Man Who Sends Me Home," "Captain Saint Lucifer," "Mercy on Broadway," "You Don't Love Me When I Cry," and "Save the Country," and also featured an interview with her manager David Geffen. Following Daly's resignation, only one more episode of "Critique" was produced and broadcast, an April 1969 episode featuring The Doors as the musical guests.

Daly did not host the syndicated version of What's My Line?, although he did co-host a 25th-anniversary program about the show for ABC in 1975. Daly was a member of the Peabody Awards Board of Jurors from 1966 to 1982. He spent most of the 1980s as a frequent forum moderator for the American Enterprise Institute, a conservative think tank.

== Tilton School ==
At his alma mater, the Tilton School, there is an award named for Daly given to "persons whose pursuit of excellence and deep commitment as a member of the school family resembles that of John Daly's involvement with Tilton: continuous and widely known expressions of support in word and deed, inspiring others to reach goals that common experience dictates are impossible." Every year during Alumni Weekend Tilton School recognizes outstanding alumni during School Meeting on Saturday. Four awards for consideration are Alumnus of the Year, George L. Plimpton Award, John Charles Daly Award, and Artist Hall of Fame.

== Personal life ==
He married twice, first to Margaret Criswell Neal (1913–1967) in January 1937. The marriage resulted in two sons, John Neal Daly and John Charles Daly III, and a daughter, Helene Grant "Bunsy" Daly. It ended in divorce in April 1959.

On December 22, 1960, Daly married Virginia Warren (1928–2009), daughter of then–chief justice Earl Warren, at Glide Memorial Church in San Francisco. They were married for more than 30 years, until Daly's death. Their marriage yielded three children: John Warren Daly, John Earl Jameson Daly, and Nina Elisabeth Daly.

=== Death ===
Daly died of cardiac arrest at his home in Chevy Chase, Maryland, on February 24, 1991, at the age of 77. His widow, Virginia Warren Daly, died on February 19, 2009, at the age of 80.

== Awards and nominations ==
Emmy Awards

- 1955: Won, "Best News Reporter or Commentator"—ABC
- 1956: Nominated, "Best News Commentator or Reporter"—ABC
- 1956: Nominated, "Best MC or Program Host, Male or Female"—CBS
- 1957: Nominated, "Best News Commentator"—ABC
- 1958: Nominated, "Best News Commentator"—ABC
- 1959: Nominated, "Best News Commentator or Analyst"—ABC

Golden Globe Award

- 1962: Won, "Best TV Star—Male"

Peabody Award

- 1954: Won, Personal Award, Radio-Television News.
- 1956: Won, ABC Television, Television News for Coverage of the National Political Conventions.
- 1957: Won, ABC Television, "Prologue '58."

Honorary degrees:

- 1959: D.Litt., St. Bonaventure University
- 1963: D.H.L., American International College
- 1964: LL.D., Norwich University

Media offices
Preceded by N/A (first host)	Host of What's My Line? 1950–1967	Succeeded by Wally Bruner (1968)
Preceded by N/A (first anchor)	ABC Evening News anchor 1953–1958	Succeeded by Don Goddard
Preceded by Don Goddard	ABC Evening News anchor 1959–1960	Succeeded by John Cameron Swayze, Al Mann, Bill Lawrence
