= Howard K. Smith =

American news anchor

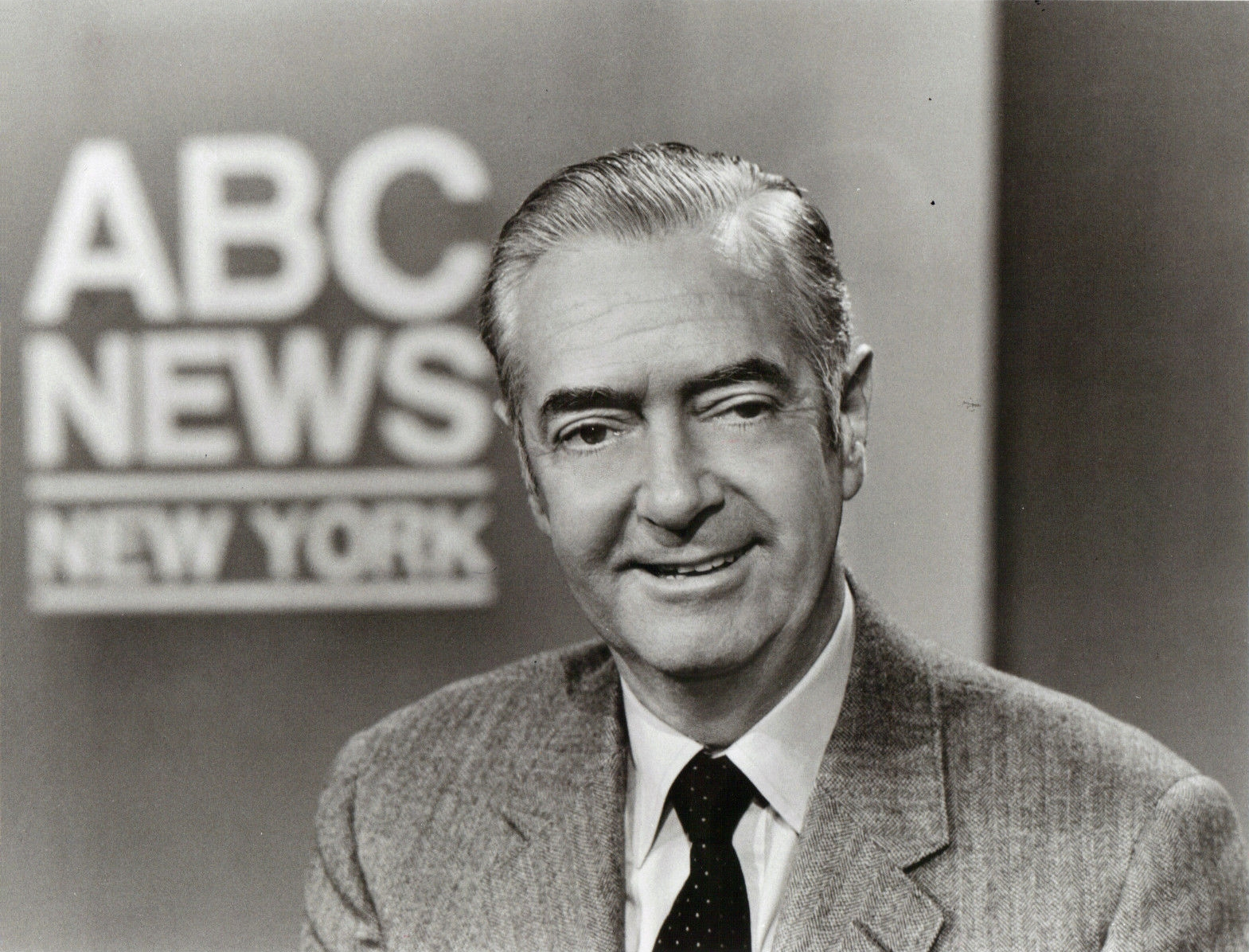
- Smith in 1972
- Born: Howard Kingsbury Smith; May 12, 1914; Ferriday, Louisiana, U.S.
- Died: February 15, 2002 (aged 87); Bethesda, Maryland, U.S.
- Occupation: News anchor
- Years active: 1940–2000
- Political party: Democratic
- Spouse: Benedicte Traberg Smith (m. 1942)
- Children: 2

Howard Kingsbury Smith (May 12, 1914 – February 15, 2002) was an American journalist, radio reporter, television anchorman, political commentator, and film actor. He was one of the original members of the team of war correspondents known as the Murrow Boys.

== Early life ==
Smith was born in Ferriday in Concordia Parish in eastern Louisiana near Natchez, Mississippi.

== Early career and CBS years ==
=== World War II ===
Upon graduating, Smith worked for the New Orleans Item, with United Press in London, and with The New York Times. In January 1940, Smith was sent to Berlin, where he joined the Columbia Broadcasting System under Edward R. Murrow. He visited Hitler's mountain retreat at Berchtesgaden and interviewed many leading Nazis, including Hitler himself, Schutzstaffel or "SS" leader Heinrich Himmler and Propaganda Minister Joseph Goebbels.

He was one of the last American reporters to leave Berlin before Germany and the United States went to war. His 1942 book, Last Train from Berlin: An Eye-Witness Account of Germany at War describes his observations from Berlin in the year after the departure of Berlin Diary author William L. Shirer. Last Train from Berlin became an American best-seller and was reprinted in 2001, shortly before Smith's death.

Smith became a significant member of the "Murrow Boys" that made CBS the dominant broadcast news organization of the era. In May 1945, he returned to Berlin to recap the German surrender.

=== Post-war ===
In 1946, Smith went to London for CBS with the title of chief European correspondent. In 1947, he made a long broadcasting tour of most of the nations of Europe, including behind the Iron Curtain. In 1949, Knopf published his The State of Europe, a 408-page country-by-country survey of Europe that drew on these experiences and that argued "both the American and the Russian policies are mistaken"; he advocated more "social reform" for Western Europe and more "political liberty" for Eastern Europe.

Despite these criticisms of Soviet policies, Smith was one of 151 alleged Communist sympathizers named in the Red Channels report issued in June 1950 at the beginning of the Red Scare, effectively placing him on the Hollywood blacklist.

Beginning on January 11, 1959, Smith moderated Behind the News with Howard K. Smith, a CBS-TV program "analying news events and the significance of issues in the news". The sustaining program was broadcast on Sundays from 6 to 6:30 p.m. Eastern Time.

=== Civil Rights reporting: Who Speaks for Birmingham? ===
Reporting on civil-rights riots in Birmingham in the early 1960s, Smith revealed the conspiracy that existed between police commissioner Bull Connor and the KKK to beat up black people and Freedom Riders. He planned to end his report "Who Speaks for Birmingham?" (broadcast date: May 18, 1961 with a quote from Edmund Burke, "The only thing necessary for the triumph of evil is for good men to do nothing," but the CBS lawyers intervened. Nonetheless, the documentary caused a stir (leading CBS to be sued and its Birmingham TV station to disaffiliate), and because his contract with CBS forbade editorializing, Smith was suspended and subsequently fired by CBS President William S. Paley.

== ABC, 1962–1979 ==
On June 5, 1968, Smith and fellow newsman Bill Lawrence were anchoring coverage of the California presidential primary that had stretched to 3 a.m. New York time. As the closing credits for the special were airing, word came that United States Senator Robert F. Kennedy of New York had been shot at the Ambassador Hotel in Los Angeles. ABC simply showed a wide shot of the chaotic newsroom for several minutes until Smith was able to confirm the initial story and go back on the air with a special report. He and Lawrence remained at their anchor desks for several more hours for reports of Kennedy's condition.

In the summer of 1968, Smith moderated a series of debates on ABC between conservative journalist William F. Buckley Jr. and liberal author Gore Vidal.

In 1969, the veteran reporter became the co-anchor of the ABC Evening News, first with Frank Reynolds, then the following year with another CBS alumnus, Harry Reasoner. He began making increasingly conservative commentaries, in particular a hard-line stance in support of the Vietnam War. He contrasted United States President Lyndon B. Johnson's decisive stance in Vietnam with the international failure to take preemptive action against Hitler. During this period Smith's son, future ABC newsman Jack Smith (April 25, 1945 – April 7, 2004), was serving with the U.S. Army 7th Cavalry Regiment in South Vietnam and fought at the Battle of Ia Drang. These commentaries endeared him to President Nixon, who rewarded him with a rare, hour-long, one-on-one interview in 1971, at the height of the administration's animus against major newspapers, CBS, and NBC, despite Smith's having broadcast his "political obituary" only nine years earlier.

ABC News commentator Howard K. Smith with Richard Nixon in 1971.

During the 1972 presidential campaign, a letter was published that Smith had written to Democratic United States Senator Edmund S. Muskie of Maine, indicating Smith's full support for Muskie. The endorsement was written on stationery with ABC's letterhead. Nothing ever came of this controversy, however, and Smith kept his job. Notwithstanding his past temporary friendly relations with Nixon (who defeated U.S. Senator George S. McGovern of South Dakota for re-election), Smith became the first national television commentator to call for Nixon's resignation over Watergate.

Smith remained as co-anchor at ABC until 1975, after which Reasoner anchored solo until Barbara Walters joined the broadcast a year later. Smith continued as an analyst until 1979; he left the network nearing full retirement, and as the Roone Arledge era was beginning at ABC News. Sources say that Smith was embittered over the reduction in time allowed for his commentaries and hence resigned after he criticized the revamped World News Tonight format as a "Punch and Judy show."

== Awards and film roles ==
Among honors which Smith received over the years were DuPont Awards in 1955 and 1963, a Sigma Delta Chi Award for radio journalism in 1957, and an award from the American Jewish Congress in 1960. In 1962 he received the Paul White Award from the Radio Television Digital News Association.

Smith also appeared in a number of films, often as himself; The Best Man (1964), The Candidate (1972), The President's Plane Is Missing (1973, a made-for-television production of the Robert J. Serling novel of the same name), Nashville (1975), Network (1976), The Pink Panther Strikes Again (scenes cut) (1976), Close Encounters of the Third Kind (1977), The Pursuit of D. B. Cooper (1981), The Best Little Whorehouse in Texas (1982), "The Odd Candidate" (1974) episode of the television series The Odd Couple (playing himself), the "Kill Oscar" episode (1976) of The Bionic Woman (playing himself anchoring an ABC newscast), and both V (1983) and the subsequent 1984 television series. He appeared as the Narrator in the 1987 film Escape from Sobibor.

Along with Last Train from Berlin, he wrote three other books, The Population Explosion (1960), the children's book Washington, D.C.: The Story of our Nation's Capital (1967), and a memoir Events Leading Up to My Death: The Life of a Twentieth-Century Reporter (1996).

== Personal life ==
Smith met his future wife, Danish news reporter Benedicte Traberg, while working in Nazi Germany in 1941. Because she was only 20 at the time, she had to return to Denmark for parental approval, but the couple re-united three months later in Berne, Switzerland. The couple were married until Smith's death in 2002. Benedicte died in 2008. Their son Jack was an ABC correspondent who received Peabody and Emmy awards for his coverage of technology. Having left journalism for a job in Silicon Valley, Jack died at age 58 in 2004 of pancreatic cancer in Marin County, California.

Media offices
| Preceded by Frank Reynolds | ABC Evening News anchor May 19, 1969 – September 5, 1975 with Frank Reynolds May 19, 1969 – December 4, 1970 with Harry Reasoner December 7, 1970 – September 5, 1975 | Succeeded by Harry Reasoner |

| Preceded by Stuart Novins | Face the Nation Moderator; November 14, 1960 – July 10, 1961 | Succeeded by Paul Niven |
