= Tom Jarriel =

American network news anchor (1934–2024)

- Born: Thomas Edwin Jarriel; December 29, 1934; LaGrange, Georgia, U.S.
- Died: October 24, 2024 (aged 89); Annapolis, Maryland, U.S.
- Education: University of Houston
- Occupation: Television journalist
- Years active: 1956–2002
- Spouse: Joan Borgeson
- Children: 3

Thomas Edwin Jarriel (December 29, 1934 – October 24, 2024) was an American television news reporter who worked for the ABC network from 1964 to 2002.

== Background ==
Jarriel was born in LaGrange, Georgia, on December 29, 1934. During his childhood, he and his family moved to Shreveport, Louisiana. He attended the University of Houston, graduating in 1956.

== Career ==
Jarriel began his career at KPRC-TV in Houston. Shortly after joining ABC News in the 1960s, he became White House correspondent for ABC, during the administrations of U.S. Presidents Richard Nixon and Gerald Ford. Later, in 1977, Jarriel co-anchored ABC Evening News on Saturdays for two years, and in 1979, joined the network's newsmagazine 20/20, as an investigative correspondent. On that show and on several hour-long documentaries, he covered subjects such as the defects in the American criminal justice system, wasteful spending by the United States Department of Defense, and transportation accidents.

During most of that time, Jarriel anchored the 15-minute bulletins ABC aired late nights on Saturday and Sunday, until those broadcasts were cancelled in 1991; he was also the most frequent anchor of the daytime ABC News Brief updates that aired during the era. He also served as substitute anchor on World News Tonight.

Jarriel retired from broadcasting in 2002, but briefly returned the following year to contribute to ABC's coverage of the Space Shuttle Columbia disaster.

== Awards and honors ==
Jarriel received 10 Emmy Awards over the course of his career.

== Personal life and death ==
Jarriel married Joan Borgeson in 1957, and they had three children. In their later years, they divided their time between Florida and Edgewater, Maryland.

Jarriel had a stroke in December 2023, and died from related complications at a care facility in Annapolis, Maryland, on October 24, 2024, at the age of 89.

Media offices
Preceded by Bill Gill	ABC News Chief White House Correspondent	Succeeded by Sam Donaldson
