= Bob Young (news anchor) =

American journalist (1923–2011)

- Born: Robert H. Young; November 7, 1923; Covington, Kentucky, U.S.
- Died: January 19, 2011 (aged 87); Ridgewood, New Jersey, U.S.
- Occupation: Journalist

Robert H. Young (November 7, 1923 – January 19, 2011) was an American television news journalist for ABC News. He served as the anchor of the ABC Evening News (now known as World News Tonight) from October 1967 to May 1968. Young's most-noteworthy broadcast took place on April 4, 1968, when he anchored ABC's coverage of the assassination of Martin Luther King Jr.

After leaving ABC, Young went to WCBS-TV in New York City where he anchored the 11:00 p.m. newscast until 1971. He later returned to radio news anchoring at New York's all-news WINS (AM), NBC Radio News and UPI Audio. Young then turned to public-relations work.

== Death ==
Young died on January 19, 2011, in Ridgewood, New Jersey, at the age of 87.

== See also ==
- List of American journalists
- List of people from Kentucky
- List of people from Manhattan
- List of people from New Jersey

Preceded by Peter Jennings	ABC Evening News; Bob Young; 1967–1968	Succeeded by Frank Reynolds
