= Don Goddard =

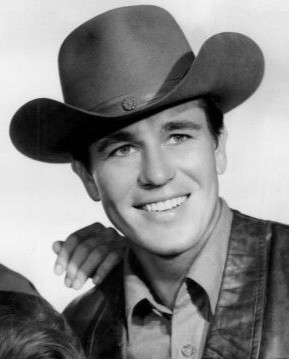
Don Durant's photo from Johnny Ringo in 1959

Don Goddard (July 5, 1904—March 20, 1994) was a radio and television announcer and newscaster who later became known for his work with geriatric alcoholism and other addictions.

Goddard was born July 5, 1904, in Binghamton, New York. He attended Princeton University and had a first career in print and broadcast journalism. During the 1940s, he served as a reporter and radio announcer for the NBC Blue Network. In addition, he narrated a series of classroom-based teenage advice films, "You and Your Family" and "You and Your Friends", both in 1946. In the late 1940s, Goddard worked as a newscaster for New York radio stations WMCA and WINS. He then returned to NBC, where he served as commentator for the early NBC News television documentary-style show, "Watch the World".

He served as ABC's anchor of the "ABC Evening News" from 1958 to 1959, replacing John Charles Daly in on early-evening news for one year, while ABC attempted a late-evening newscast, which Daly hosted. While serving as a newscaster for ABC News, he was one of their primary announcers to break the news of the assassination of John F. Kennedy in November 1963. While ABC announcer Ed Silverman was the first to announce the bulletin, it was Goddard who helmed the network's initial coverage of the tragedy. Goddard also was the host of the ABC television series Medical Horizons, an on-the-scene documentary about medical advances at American hospitals and research centers. He retired in 1970 as head of ABC's Biographical and History Archive, which he had helped to establish.

After retiring from broadcasting, Goddard collaborated with Bill Wilson, co-founder of Alcoholics Anonymous, on A.A. documentaries and the publication A.A. Grapevine. That experience led to his working with alcoholism after he retired and moved to Arizona, first becoming a consultant to the Mile High Council on Alcoholism and then joining the staff of St. Luke's Chemical Dependency Program in Phoenix as a consultant and therapist. As a therapist Goddard developed special treatments for older people with addictions. His "Top o' the Hill Gang" for patients over 55 at St. Luke's fostered similar programs at clinics across the country.

Goddard died March 20, 1994, in Sun City, Arizona.

Preceded by John Charles Daly	ABC Evening News anchor 1958–1959	Succeeded by John Charles Daly
