= Sam Donaldson =

American journalist (born 1934)

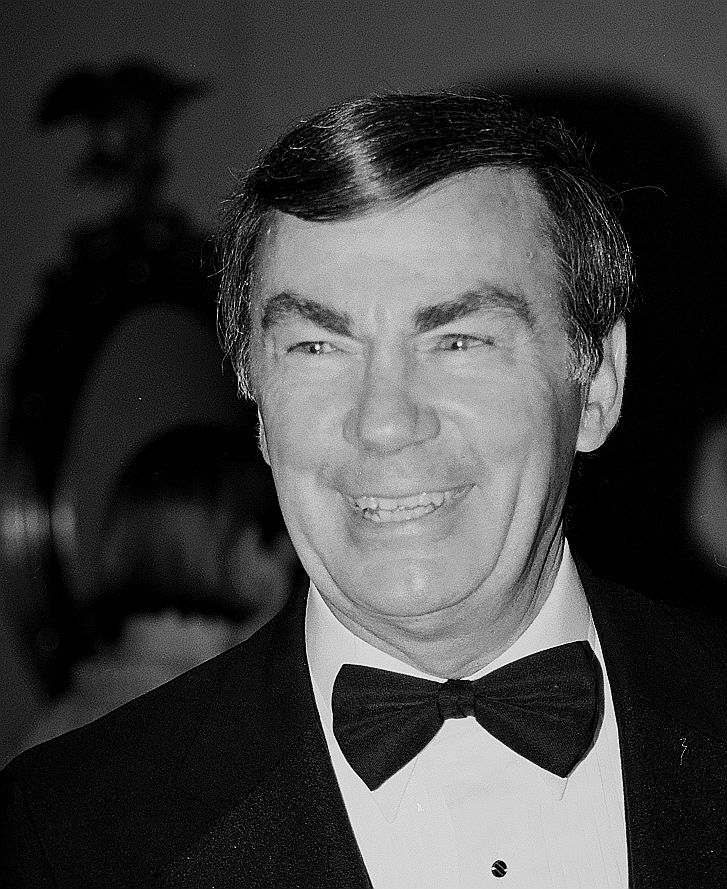
- Donaldson in 1995
- Born: Samuel Andrew Donaldson, Jr. March 11, 1934 (age 92); El Paso, Texas, U.S.
- Occupations: Journalist; television news pundit; panelist for ABC News Now
- Years active: 1967–2009
- Spouses: Patricia Oates (m. 1954; div. 1962) Billie Kay Butler (m. 1963; div. 1980) Janice C. Smith (m. 1983; div. 2014) Sandra Martorelli (m. 2014)
- Children: 4
- Military service
- Branch: United States Army
- Service years: 1956–1959
- Rank: Captain

Samuel Andrew Donaldson Jr. (born March 11, 1934) is an American retired television reporter and news anchor. He broadcast with ABC News from 1967 to 2009. He was well known as the White House Correspondent (1977–1989 and 1998–99) with a booming loud voice, which could get the attention of President Reagan, amazingly cutting through the noise of whirling helicopter blades. He was a panelist and co-anchor of Sunday's This Week on the American Broadcasting Company (ABC).

== Early life and career ==
Donaldson was born in El Paso, Texas, on March 11, 1934. He is the son of Chloe (née Hampson), a school teacher, and Samuel Donaldson, a farmer. He grew up on their family farm in Chamberino, New Mexico. This was in the New Mexico Territory when his father had bought it in 1910, two years before New Mexico was admitted to the Union.

He attended New Mexico Military Institute and Texas Western College (now known as University of Texas at El Paso), where he served as station manager of KTEP, the campus radio station, and joined the Kappa Sigma fraternity. From 1956 to 1959, Donaldson served on active duty as an artillery officer in the United States Army, attaining the rank of Captain (USAR). While on active duty in 1958, Donaldson was one of the military observers of an atomic test in the Nevada testing grounds when an atomic device, with a yield roughly equivalent to the bombs dropped on Japan, was detonated three thousand yards away from the slit trench protecting the observers.

Following military service, Donaldson was hired by KRLD-TV (now KDFW-TV), the then-CBS television affiliate in Dallas, Texas. After a year, he resigned and moved to New York City to look for a job in broadcast news. He failed to get one.

He was hired by WTOP-TV (currently WUSA-TV) in Washington, D.C., in February 1961. He covered both local and national stories, including the Goldwater presidential campaign in 1964, the Senate debates on the civil rights bill in March 1964, and the Medicare bill the following year. He anchored the 6:00 pm Saturday and Sunday evening newscasts, with John Douglas doing the weather forecasts.

== ABC News ==
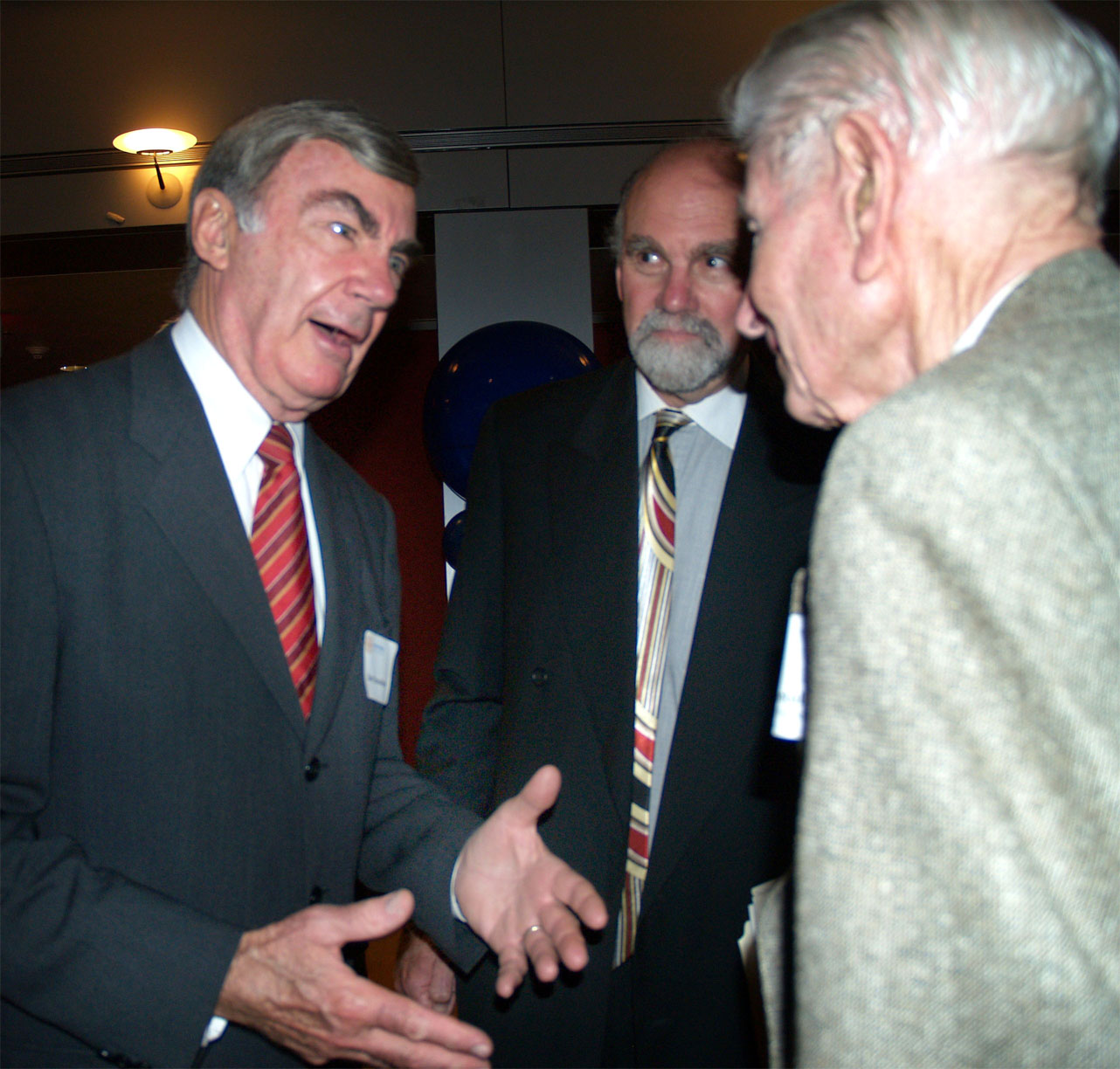
Donaldson in 2007

Donaldson was hired by ABC News as a Washington correspondent in October 1967. He covered the two major party political conventions in 1968 and in 1969 began anchoring the network's 11:00 pm Saturday and Sunday newscasts.

In 1971, Donaldson covered the Vietnam War for ABC News. He was ABC's chief Watergate correspondent in 1973–74, covering the trial of the Watergate burglars, the Senate Watergate hearings and the House Judiciary Committee's impeachment investigation of President Nixon.

=== Chief White House Correspondent ===
Donaldson covered Jimmy Carter's 1976 presidential campaign and became the network's White House Correspondent in January 1977, a post he held until January 1989. One of his most widely remembered questions during his tenure at the White House came during the Reagan administration: "Mr. President, in talking about the continuing recession tonight, you have blamed mistakes of the past, and you have blamed the congress. Does any of the blame belong to you?" To which Reagan retorted: "Yes, because for many years I was a Democrat!" In January 1998, Donaldson was once again assigned to the White House as the network's chief correspondent there and served until mid-1999. He covered the Lewinsky scandal and the impeachment of President Clinton.

=== This Week ===
Donaldson appeared as a panelist on the Sunday morning television program This Week with David Brinkley from its inception in 1981 and after Brinkley's retirement in 1996 co-anchored the This Week program with Cokie Roberts until the two were replaced in September 2002 by George Stephanopoulos. He still occasionally serves as a panelist on This Week.

=== Primetime Live and 20/20 ===
In August 1989, Donaldson became co-anchor of the network's new magazine program Primetime Live with Diane Sawyer. He and Sawyer co-anchored Primetime Live from 1989 to 1998 and its successor, 20/20 Wednesday, from 1998 to 2000. One of his reports featured a Nazi Gestapo officer named Erich Priebke who had escaped to Argentina after World War II. Donaldson's team located Priebke in 1994, and Donaldson interviewed him on a street in Bariloche, Argentina, about his role in the execution of 335 Italian civilians on the direct orders of Adolf Hitler in the caves outside Rome. When the report aired, Italy demanded Priebke's extradition and Argentina eventually complied. Priebke was sentenced to life in prison in Italy for his crimes.

=== Other ===
Donaldson anchored the ABC Sunday Evening News from its inception in 1979 until August 1989.

In 1990–91, Donaldson covered the Gulf War (Operation Desert Shield and Operation Desert Storm) and co-anchored Primetime Live from Kuwait City two days after the Iraqi troops were forced out.

In 1991, he ended the ABC News Nightline broadcast to announce the dissolution of the Soviet Union with playing the Anthem of the Soviet Union and a video of the last Soviet Kremlin Flag lowered and the Raising of the Russian Tricolor, including the resignation of Gorbachev as President of the USSR.

In August 1992, Donaldson and his producer David Kaplan went to Sarajevo on assignment. On the way into town from the airport, Kaplan, riding in a second vehicle, was shot to death by a sniper. That night from Belgrade, Donaldson, co-anchoring the program Primetime Live, reported on Kaplan's death.

In 2002, Donaldson anchored the first regularly scheduled U.S. news broadcast on the Internet and, in later years, hosted the ABC News Now "Politics Live" broadcast.

On August 2, 2006, during the last White House Press conference in the briefing room before undergoing major renovations, Donaldson shouted, "Mr. President, should Mel Gibson be forgiven?", referencing reports of the actor/producer's alleged anti-Semitic remarks. President George W. Bush laughed and looked up to see who had asked the question. Bush joked, "Is that Sam Donaldson? Forget it ... you're a 'has-been'! We don't have to answer has-beens' questions." Donaldson replied, "Better to have been a has-been than a never-was."

With the exception of the Republican convention in August 1992, Donaldson covered every major political party convention from 1964 to 2012, until he retired from ABC in 2009.

Donaldson was voted Best White House Correspondent in 1985 by readers of the Washington Journalism Review and Best Television Correspondent in 1986, 1987, 1988, and 1989 by readers of the same magazine. Among his other awards are four Emmys, three Peabodys, the Edward R. Murrow award 1997 (WSU), the Paul White award (RTNDA 1998), and he and his wife Jan were among those named as "Washingtonians of the Year" by Washingtonian magazine in 2002.

=== Federal aid scandals ===
==== Mohair subsidies ====
In 1995, the struggle in DC over whether to cut the growing deficit touched Donaldson directly. Bruce Ingersoll, award-winning journalist for the Chicago Sun-Times and The Wall Street Journal, published a column entitled "As Congress Considers Slashing Crop Subsidies, Affluent Urban Farmers Come Under Scrutiny," where he named Donaldson as one of the wealthy, absentee beneficiaries of Federal subsidies, the "third largest recipient" of federal funds in his area.

During the debate in Congress over whether to cut "pork," this article was read into the Congressional Record, and Donaldson was chastised by Senator Al D'Amato to "Give the money back," a phrase repeated multiple times in his floor speech and elsewhere.

There were claims that Donaldson received as much as $1 million in subsidies. The real number turned out to be around $188,000, but the scandal of a millionaire receiving money for a farm on which he was "absentee" still got significant public coverage.

The subsidy was held up as a sign of how meaningless much of the pork was, as the Federal government had stopped using mohair for uniforms in 1960, after only seven years of subsidies, but was still subsidizing its production over three decades later, and apparently giving out money to people other than "poor family farmers." Even the Department of Agriculture was on record as wanting the program ended.

Donaldson initially refused to comment, but eventually defended himself by describing the mohair subsidy as "built into the price of sheep," and claimed he had "argued against subsidies for years" and was glad when the program was finally "killed," but in fact mohair subsidies continued all the way to 2012.

==== Pest control ====
Only a year later, Donaldson was embroiled in another federal aid scandal. While still receiving federal mohair subsidies, it was revealed that he was also using federal resources to kill prairie dogs, bobcats, foxes, and coyotes on his ranch. His farm was reported to have used the USDA's Animal Damage Control agents 412 times in only 5 years. This sparked outrage among both deficit hawks and animal rights activists.

This was actually brought to light by Donaldson's own demands for more federal money. He claimed to have lost a number of sheep to predators despite the heavy use of federal resources, and therefore wanted federal money to pay for his losses: "The government helps ranchers and farmers and businesses of all kinds. If it's in existence and I am eligible to use it, I'll use it."

In an interview, Donaldson said of the animal rights complaints:

What are we going to do about the coyotes, that are eating the lambs like there's no tomorrow? They're eating so many lambs, I thought the other day I'd put out some mint jelly, in case they want it with their mutton. Every time I say this, the conservationists and the people who love animals just jump all over me. "What? A coyote is a predator and has a right to live." Yeah, they have a right to live, I'm all for that, but they're eating my lambs, folks. I just put it to you, doesn't the lamb have a right to live? "Yeah, but you're going to sell the lamb and they're going to kill the lamb for the money." That's right. If you're going to be in the sheep ranching business, you have to try to get rid of the coyotes. Otherwise, you're not going to stay in the ranching business.

== Career timeline ==
- 1961–1967: Reporter/Anchor WTOP-TV, Washington, D.C.
- 1967–1977: ABC News Capitol Hill Correspondent
- 1977–1989, January 1998 – August 1999: ABC News Chief White House Correspondent
- 1979–1989: World News Sunday anchor
- 1981–1996, 2002–2013: This Week panelist
- August 1989 – 1998: Primetime Live co-anchor
- November 1996 – September 2002: This Week co-moderator
- 1998–2000: 20/20 anchor
- 1999–2001: Sam Donaldson ABCNews.com host
- October 2001 – May 2004: The Sam Donaldson Show -- Live in America host
- May 2004 – February 2009: "Politics Live" anchor, ABC News Now
- February 2009: Retired from ABC News

== Accolades ==
- 1996: Golden Plate Award of the American Academy of Achievement
- 1997: Edward R. Murrow Award, Washington State University
- Various: Four Emmy Awards
- Various: Three Peabody Awards
- 2000: DuPont Award
- 2008: Paul White Award, Radio Television Digital News Association
- 2019: Honorary Doctor of Humane Letters, New Mexico State University

== Personal life ==
Donaldson's marriage to Jan Smith ended in divorce in 2014.

Donaldson has been married to Sandra Martorelli Donaldson since December 2014. They live in Albuquerque, New Mexico.

Donaldson has four children from previous marriages: Samuel III, Jennifer, Thomas, and Robert Donaldson.

In 1995, Donaldson had a melanoma removed from a lymph node. Since then, he has been an active supporter of cancer research.

Donaldson operates a family cattle ranch in Lincoln County, New Mexico. On July 5, 2004, three members of the ranch foreman's family were found murdered. Cody Posey, a 14-year-old and sole remaining survivor of the family, was arrested and charged with the murders, faced a life sentence, but was given a chance at rehabilitation, convicted and sentenced to juvenile detention until age 21. While in custody, Posey completed his high school degree and almost two years of college credits. Posey, who had suffered years of verbal and physical abuse, was released the day before 21st birthday in October 2010.

Donaldson appears in the 2008 political documentary about Lee Atwater, entitled Boogie Man: The Lee Atwater Story. In the film, he says, "An operative never comes and says, 'here is a story I'd like you to run for me, but just in private conversation, did you know this about so and so, we're still checking it mind you, but, but it's probably going to turn out to be true.' Well, you don't want to be beaten by your competition and wait until they announce it. They put it on the conveyor belt and you just run it out."

Donaldson is a past member of the board of directors of the Library of American Broadcasting, the American Academy of Achievement boards; the past president of the advisory board of the Woodrow Wilson International Center for Scholars; and chairman emeritus of the advisory board of the H. Lee Moffitt Cancer Center in Tampa, Florida. He is currently a member of the Board of New Mexico First, the State's bi-partisan booster organization, and the Ford Theater Advisory Council.

On December 1, 2012, Donaldson was arrested for driving under the influence of alcohol in Lewes, Delaware. Charges were dropped on Friday, November 8, 2013, by a Delaware judge, citing lack of probable cause for the arrest.

== Books ==
- Donaldson, Sam (1987). Hold On, Mr. President!. Random House. ISBN 0-449-21520-2.

Media offices
| Preceded by Tom Jarriel | ABC News Chief White House Correspondent; 1977–1989 | Succeeded by Brit Hume |
| Preceded by John Donvan | ABC News Chief White House Correspondent; 1998–1999 | Succeeded by Terry Moran |
| Preceded by David Brinkley | This Week moderator November 17, 1996 – September 8, 2002 | Succeeded by George Stephanopoulos |
