= Ron Cochran =

Canadian American TV news anchor

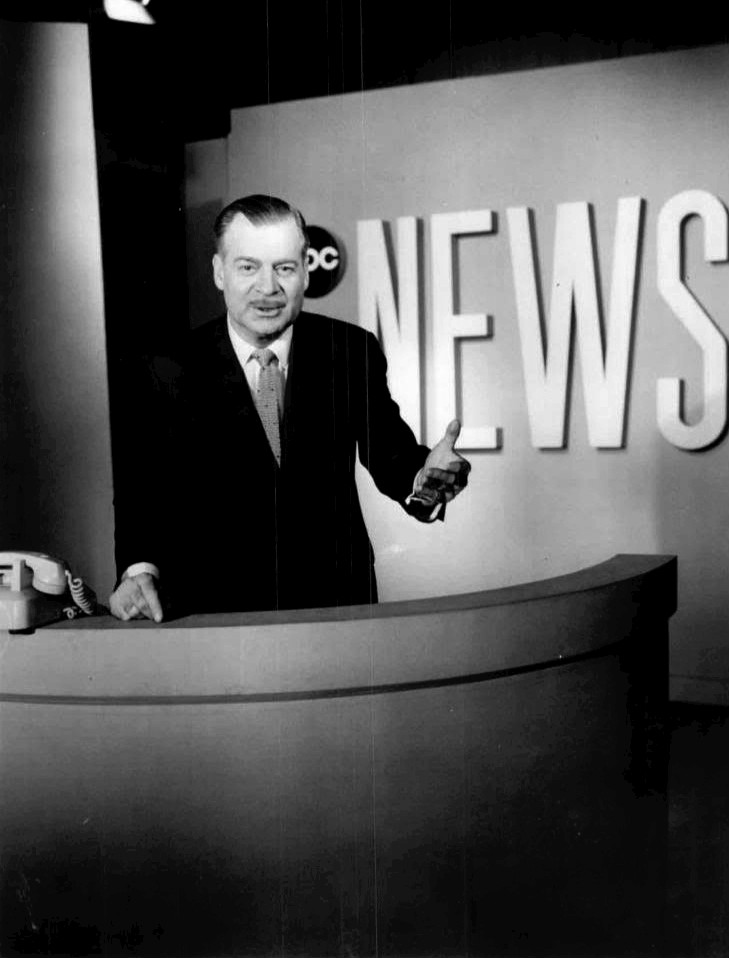
Ron Cochran in a promotional image for Ron Cochran with the News in 1963.

Ron Cochran (September 20, 1912 – July 25, 1994) was a Canadian-born American television news journalist who worked for ABC and CBS. He served as the anchor of Ron Cochran with the News, ABC's evening news program, from 1962 to 1965. In November 1963, he served as the network's principal anchor for the around-the-clock coverage of the assassination of US President John F. Kennedy. Before that, he hosted the CBS drama television series Armstrong Circle Theatre.

Cochran was born in Saskatchewan, Canada, and grew up in Fairfield, Iowa, where he received his elementary and secondary education. He majored in physics at Parsons College and went to the University of Florida for graduate study in that field. He decided on a career change before he finished the latter studies.

Cochran worked as a reporter for the Rock Island Argus before an audition resulted in a job broadcasting news for radio station WHBF, which was owned by the newspaper's management.

After working in Midwest radio stations, he joined the Federal Bureau of Investigation for two years. Then, in 1945, he went to work at a Boston radio station.

In 1951, he was hired by CBS, where he did both television and radio based in Washington. In 1954, he went to WCBS-TV, where he was a newscaster on the 7 P.M. and 11 P.M. news programs. He left WCBS in 1960 to work on a daily 1 P.M. newscast on CBS-TV. He also was the moderator of the CBS-TV programs Man of the Week, from 1952 to 1954, and Youth Takes a Stand, from 1954 to 1955, and CBS Radio's Answer, Please! from 1958 to 1959.

Cochran resigned from CBS News in July 1961 to become host of Armstrong Circle Theatre, saying, "Armstrong offered me an opportunity that I couldn't pass up".

After moving to ABC, he anchored Ron Cochran with the News from 1963 to 1965. He then started Ron Cochran Enterprises, which produced radio and television programs.

As previously noted, Cochran was the main anchor of ABC's break in coverage of the assassination of President John F. Kennedy on November 22, 1963. Cochran announced the death of President Kennedy as "confirmed" and ABC News ran a graphic showing Kennedy's picture and the dates 1917–1963 after a wire service report came to him that "government sources in Washington" had stated the President was dead, something both CBS' Walter Cronkite and NBC's Bill Ryan chose not to do. This wire report came to Cochran several minutes before assistant press secretary Malcolm Kilduff officially announced the President's death.

Despite the rival networks' expansion in 1963 of their evening newscasts to a full half-hour, ABC's evening newscast would run only 15 minutes during Cochran's tenure; the network deferred expansion until Peter Jennings, his successor, took over the anchor's desk for his first stint. Cochran later went to KGO-TV and anchored newscasts with Roger Grimsby.

Cochran married Beulah Tracht. They had a son, Ronald, and a daughter, Judy. He died on July 25, 1994, aged 81, in Lake Worth, Florida, after a heart attack.

Preceded by John Cameron Swayze, Al Mann, Bill Lawrence	ABC Evening News News anchor 1962 – 1964	Succeeded by Peter Jennings
