= ABC News Radio (United States) =

Radio service of ABC News in the United States

- Type: Radio network
- Country: United States
- Headquarters: ABC News World Headquarters; New York City; United States
- Branding: ABC News

Ownership
- Owner: ABC Audio; (ABC News)

History
- Launch date: January 1, 1968; 58 years ago

Coverage
- Availability: National, through regional affiliates.

Links
- Website: abcaudio.com/news-radio/

ABC News Radio is the news radio service of ABC Audio, a division of ABC News in the United States. Formerly known as ABC Radio News, ABC News Radio feeds 5-minute newscasts on the hour, and news briefs at half-past the hour, to its network affiliates. ABC News Radio is the largest commercial radio news organization in the US.

ABC Radio aired the first broadcast report of the assassination of President John F. Kennedy on November 22, 1963. Kennedy was shot in Dallas, Texas, at 18:30 UTC and Don Gardiner anchored the initial bulletin at 18:36:50 UTC, minutes before any other radio or television network.

== History ==
Beginning in the late 1950s, ABC fed hourly newscasts to affiliates at 5 minutes before the hour, to contrast it with CBS Radio News and NBC Radio News, which sent its newscasts to affiliates at the top of each hour. On January 1, 1968, the singular ABC radio network was split into 4 separate and distinct programming services. The American Contemporary Network, on major-market contemporary music stations like WABC New York, aired news at 5 minutes before the hour. American Information Network news ran at the top of the hour on major-market talk and information stations like KGO San Francisco. The American FM Network, carried on major-market FM stations such as WPLJ New York, aired news geared toward young adult listeners at 15 minutes past the hour, while the American Entertainment Network had news at the bottom of the hour, often carried by AM country music stations, such as WBAP in Dallas-Fort Worth.

ABC News Radio logo used from 2007 to 2013.

Before the split, ABC reached an understanding with the Federal Communications Commission concerning the "Chain Broadcasting" rule, which forced the sale of the NBC Blue Network and enabled ABC's creation in 1943. Each of the four networks could be cleared only when no other ABC network was on the air in a particular market. Though each of the 4 new "networks" were distributed to all member radio stations nationally over the same broadcast-quality telephone line, the move allowed ABC to have as many as 4 affiliates in one city – a major competitive advantage and a dramatic turning point in the history of network radio. Two additional news networks, ABC Rock and ABC Direction, were added on January 4, 1982, after the network became a satellite-delivered service. The network was strict in its insistence that there be no simultaneous broadcast of more than a single network in a market, except during crisis or special event coverage.

After the sale of most of ABC's radio assets to Citadel Broadcasting in 2007, the ABC Radio Network was operated by the broadcaster as part of the Citadel Media Networks division, and still distributed ABC News content. Citadel Broadcasting was later acquired by Cumulus Media. In July 2014, Cumulus announced that it would end its partnership with ABC News, and begin a new partnership with CNN to syndicate news content via the new Westwood One News network for its stations, beginning on January 1, 2015. In turn, ABC announced that it would take the syndication of its radio content in-house under a revived ABC Radio.

Despite many of ABC's former heritage radio properties no longer carrying any ABC programming, ABC affiliated with some other heritage radio stations, including WTOP-FM Washington, WLW Cincinnati, KOA Denver, KOMO Seattle, KTRS St. Louis, KSL Salt Lake City, and KMBZ Kansas City. Before being acquired by Westwood One, ABC News Radio programming was available in podcast form on iHeartRadio due to Cumulus radio stations streaming on iHeart. When Cumulus started using Westwood One/CNN for their national news, ABC News Radio's digital presence was moved exclusively to Slacker (now LiveOne) until 2020, when it was replaced with news from Associated Press.

On July 9, 2020, Westwood One made the decision to fold its news network on August 30, and shortly thereafter, Cumulus reaffiliated most of its news/talk stations with ABC with a handful of others affiliating with other networks. While those ABC's heritage radio stations used Westwood One News as their national news provider, a few Cumulus stations formerly affiliated with ABC (example KARN-FM Little Rock) carried CBS.

On May 21, 2026, Audacy, Inc. affiliated its heritage CBS News Radio affiliates (including KCBS San Francisco, KNX Los Angeles, WBBM Chicago, WCCO Minneapolis, and WWJ Detroit among others) with ABC News Radio, ahead of CBS News Radio's closure the following day.

== Format ==
Of the 6 networks, only Information, Entertainment and ABC FM News remain as separate newscast services today, with their programming delivered via satellite. The "Information" network newscasts clear on major-market stations. "Entertainment" network news airs mainly on small and medium-market stations. ABC FM News newscasts air on a small number of FM music stations. These ABC News Radio newscasts originate from the news division's bureaus in New York, Washington and Los Angeles and air exactly at the top of the hour. The standard format is the same for all three, with the Entertainment and FM networks having shorter stories and the Information network having slightly longer stories and more global coverage.

Individual soundbites and reporter packages are fed to stations via satellite and an affiliate website. In addition to the top-of-the-hour newscasts, ABC News also provides its radio affiliates with headlines, briefs and "status reports" that air every 10 minutes, as well as special reports, special event coverage and long form programming.

== News and Comment ==
ABC News Radio produced News and Comment, a twice-daily long-form program hosted by broadcaster Paul Harvey, who also would read the program's commercial messages in a seamless transition. This program originated from Chicago and began its run in 1951.

On January 1, 1968, News and Comment became a part of ABC's "American Entertainment Network", although the program was also heard on stations affiliated with the other ABC Networks, if the "Entertainment" affiliate was not as powerful as another ABC affiliate in a given market. A 5-minute long spin-off voiced by Harvey, The Rest of the Story, began in May 1976 and was offered to affiliates in the late afternoons, as well as on Saturday mornings.

After Paul Harvey's death on February 28, 2009, San Francisco-based broadcaster Gil Gross was appointed as the new host of News and Comment, while the Rest of the Story time slot was held by Doug Limerick. Shortly after their appointments, however, Mike Huckabee was hired to host his own thrice-daily commentary program, The Huckabee Report, offered to stations that had been carrying both programs in the same time slots. This program, however, was produced by the former ABC Radio Network, at that point rebranded as Citadel Media, eventually becoming Cumulus Media, and finally Westwood One. Huckabee took over distribution of the program himself as a digital-only feature in 2015.

== ABC News and Talk ==
Former logo

ABC News And Talk was a news/talk and entertainment radio channel programmed and distributed by ABC Radio Networks for satellite radio services. It aired on XM Satellite Radio channel 124, and Sirius Satellite Radio channel 143 both in the United States until September 24, 2007.

The channel also existed on Sirius Canada until February 2007. Each morning, the channel featured a six-hour news wheel, produced by ABC News Radio. In the afternoon, hourly newscasts preceded some of ABC Radio's top talk show talent, like Sean Hannity, KABC's Larry Elder and WBAP's Mark Davis.

ABC News And Talk used to host a mid-day talk show exclusively for satellite radio titled Live from 125. The show's host was rotated on a weekly basis so there were several different program personalities. This show was discontinued in 2006.

In September 2006, John Batchelor took a leave of absence from the ABC Radio network. Mark Levin took his place on the ABC News And Talk lineup. Levin's show was broadcast on a 2-hour tape-delay basis, which was assumed to be twofold: to protect Elder's spot in the lineup, since Elder had the slot prior to Levin's arrival, and so Levin can continue to grow his terrestrial affiliate base.

The channel was programmed by ABC Radio until June 12, 2007, when it was turned over to Citadel Broadcasting as part of the divestiture by ABC parent Disney of nearly all of its radio assets. The network was shut down September 24, 2007.

=== Former on-air staff ===
- ABC Satellite News has ceased production, as it was produced exclusively for this channel.
- Sean Hannity, ABC Radio Networks' (Citadel/Cumulus Media Networks and now Westwood One's) most popular host, can be heard live, all three hours, weekdays on XM's America Right and Sirius' SIRIUS Patriot Channel 144.
- Mark Levin can also be heard live, for 3 hours, weekdays on America Right and SIRIUS Patriot.
- Bob Brinker retired from radio broadcasting in 2018; Brinker died in 2024
- Mark Davis' show has since been dropped from ABC Radio Networks, reverting to a local show on WBAP, and Davis has reestablished his national presence by becoming a substitute host for various shows, including The Rush Limbaugh Show. He is now heard on KSKY since 2012.
- While The Larry Elder Show is no longer airing on either satellite provider, he has returned to his regular local (Los Angeles) drive-time (3-6 pm Pacific) time-slot on KABC. His show streams free over the internet during most live broadcasts, and is podcast for "Elderado" subscribers.
- The Satellite Sisters were not picked up by either service, and were dropped from ABC Radio Networks in October. Since then, their show is now an internet–based podcast.
- Peter Tilden will no longer be heard on either satellite provider. He was laid off by KABC in cost-cutting measures in February 2008, but was called back to work (replacing Doug McIntyre) in October 2009. This version of the show will strictly be local.
- John Batchelor returned to radio in 2008. As of 2009, he is heard on America's Talk on XM, though not yet on Sirius.

== Correspondents ==
- New York: Cheri Preston, Michelle Franzen, Aaron Katersky, Brad Mielke, Chuck Sivertsen, Dave Packer, Brian Clark, Mike Dobuski, Wayne Cabot, Stephanie Officer
- Chicago: Ryan Burrow
- Dallas: Jim Ryan
- Miami: Lionel Moise
- Rome: Megan Williams
- Los Angeles: Alex Stone, Tim Pulliam, Melissa Adan, Blake Troli
- Washington: Andy Field, Steven Portnoy, Karen Travers, Em Nguyen, Alex Presha, Faith Abubey, Ike Ejiochi, Nicole D'Antonio, Lindsay Watts, Perry Russom
- Mexico City: Conor Finnegan
- Jerusalem: Jordana Miller
- Austin: Olivia Osteen
- St. Louis: Kent Martin
- Orlando: Tony Marino
- Providence: Steve Klamkin
- Seattle: Jeff Pohjola

=== Notable former on-air staff ===
- Ann Compton – White House Correspondent; retired September 10, 2014, after 41 years at the network.
- Bill Downs
- Charles Gibson – anchored the Information Network newscast; retired in 2009
- Paul Harvey – long-time host of News and Comment
- Doug Limerick – anchored the Information Network newscast weekday mornings
