= ABC News (United States) =

News division of ABC

- News division of: ABC
- Key people: Almin Karamehmedovic (President)
- Founded: June 15, 1945; 81 years ago
- Headquarters: ABC News Headquarters; 7 Hudson Square; 310 Hudson Street; Lower Manhattan; United States
- Studios: ABC News Headquarters; 7 Hudson Square; (New York City); ABC-owned stations; (across the United States)
- Area served: Worldwide
- Broadcast programs: ABC World News Tonight; Nightline; This Week; 20/20; Good Morning America; World News Now; Good Morning America First Look; The View; Tamron Hall
- Parent: Disney Entertainment Television
- Units: ABC Audio; ABC News Studios; Lincoln Square Productions
- Slogan: "See the whole picture." "Every day more Americans choose ABC News, America's #1 news source."
- Website: abcnews.com

ABC News is the news division of the American television network ABC. Its flagship program is the daily evening newscast ABC World News Tonight with David Muir; other programs include morning news-talk show Good Morning America, Nightline, 20/20, and This Week with George Stephanopoulos. The network also includes daytime talk shows The View, Live with Kelly and Mark, and Tamron Hall. In addition to the division's television programs, ABC News has radio and digital outlets, including ABC News Radio and ABC News Live, plus various podcasts hosted by ABC News personalities.

== History ==
=== 20th-century origins ===
ABC began in 1943 as the NBC Blue Network, a radio network that was spun off from NBC, as ordered by the Federal Communications Commission (FCC) in 1942. The reason for the order was to expand competition in radio broadcasting in the United States, specifically news and political broadcasting, and broaden the projected points of view. Only a few companies, such as NBC and CBS, dominated the radio market. NBC conducted the split voluntarily in case its appeal of the ruling was denied, and it was forced to split its two networks into separate companies.

Regular television news broadcasts on ABC began soon after the network signed on its initial owned-and-operated television station (WJZ-TV, now WABC-TV) and production center in New York City in August 1948. Broadcasts continued as the ABC network expanded nationwide. Until the early 1970s, ABC News programs and ABC in general consistently ranked third in viewership behind CBS and NBC news programs. ABC had fewer affiliate stations and a weaker prime-time programming slate to support the network's news operations compared to the two larger networks, each of which had established their radio news operations during the 1930s.

=== Roone Arledge ===
Logo used from 1978 to 1999

By the 1970s, the network had effectively turned around, with its prime-time entertainment programs achieving more substantial ratings and drawing in higher advertising revenue and profits for ABC overall. With the appointment of the president of ABC Sports, Roone Arledge as president of ABC News in 1977, ABC invested the resources to make it a significant source of news content. Arledge, known for experimenting with the broadcast "model", created many of ABC News' most popular and enduring programs, including 20/20, World News Tonight, This Week, Nightline, and Primetime Live. ABC News' longtime slogan, "More Americans get their news from ABC News than from any other source." (introduced in the late 1980s), was a claim referring to the number of people who watch, listen to and read ABC News content on television, radio and (eventually) the Internet, and not necessarily to the telecasts alone.

In June 1998, ABC News (which owned an 80% stake in the service), Nine Network and ITN sold their respective interests in Worldwide Television News to the Associated Press (AP). Additionally, ABC News signed a multi-year content deal with the AP for its affiliate video service, Associated Press Television News (APTV), while providing material from ABC's news video service, ABC News One, to APTV.

=== 1985 Marilyn Monroe scandal ===
Scandal erupted on October 7, 1985, over a decision by Arledge, president of ABC News and Sports, to kill a 13-minute report about Marilyn Monroe, possibly due to his close ties to Ethel Kennedy. 20/20 drew criticism from the program's co-anchors, Hugh Downs and Barbara Walters, and the executive producer, Av Westin. Arledge said that he had killed the piece because it was "gossip-column stuff" and "does not live up to its billing." Downs, however, took issue with Arledge's judgment. "I am upset about the way it was handled," he said in an interview. "I honestly believe that this is more carefully documented than anything any network did during Watergate. I lament the fact that the decision reflects badly on people I respect and it reflects badly on me and the broadcast." Additionally, Westin said: "I don't anticipate not putting it on the air. The journalism is solid. Everything in there has two sources. We are documenting that there was a relationship between Bobby and Marilyn and Jack and Marilyn. A variety of eyewitnesses attest to that on camera." Two other aspects of the unaired report, according to an ABC staff member who has seen it, are eyewitness accounts of wiretapping of Monroe's home by Jimmy Hoffa, the teamster leader, that reveal meetings between her and the Kennedy brothers, and accounts of a visit to Monroe by Robert F. Kennedy on the day of her death. Fred Otash, a detective who said he was the chief wiretapper, is interviewed on camera, and ABC staff members said three other wiretappers corroborated his account. In addition, several people not in the book say on camera that Monroe kept diaries with references to meetings with the Kennedy brothers, according to a staff member who has seen the report. "It set out to be a piece which would demonstrate that because of alleged relations between Robert Kennedy and John F. Kennedy and Monroe, the presidency was compromised because organized crime was involved," he said. "Based on what has been uncovered so far, there was no evidence." Arledge's decision to kill the broadcast resulted in the subsequent decision of Geraldo Rivera to leave ABC entirely. Rivera was a 20/20 correspondent but did not work on that story. He had been publicly critical of Arledge's decision. Arledge, a champion and defender of Rivera, said he thought the story needed more work. The story probed purported affairs between actress Marilyn Monroe, President John F. Kennedy, and his brother Robert F. Kennedy.

=== 21st century ===
On August 7, 2014, ABC announced that it would relaunch its radio network division, ABC Radio, on January 1, 2015. The change occurred following the announcement that Cumulus would replace its ABC News radio service with Westwood One News (via CNN). On September 20, 2019, ABC Radio was renamed as ABC Audio as the network has evolved to offer a podcast portfolio and other forms of on-demand and linear content.

In April 2018, it was announced that FiveThirtyEight would be transferred to ABC News from ESPN, Inc., majority owned by the Walt Disney Company. On September 10, 2018, ABC News launched a second attempt to extend its Good Morning America brand into the afternoon with GMA3: What You Need to Know. In May 2019, ABC News Live, a news focused streaming channel, was launched on Roku. Following a reorganization of ABC's parent company, The Walt Disney Company which created the Walt Disney Direct-to-Consumer and International segment in March 2018, ABC News Digital and Live Streaming, including ABC News Live and FiveThirtyEight, were transferred to the new segment.

In an October 2018 Simmons Research survey of 38 news organizations, ABC News was ranked the second most trusted news organization by Americans, behind The Wall Street Journal.

Trump v. American Broadcasting Companies, Inc.
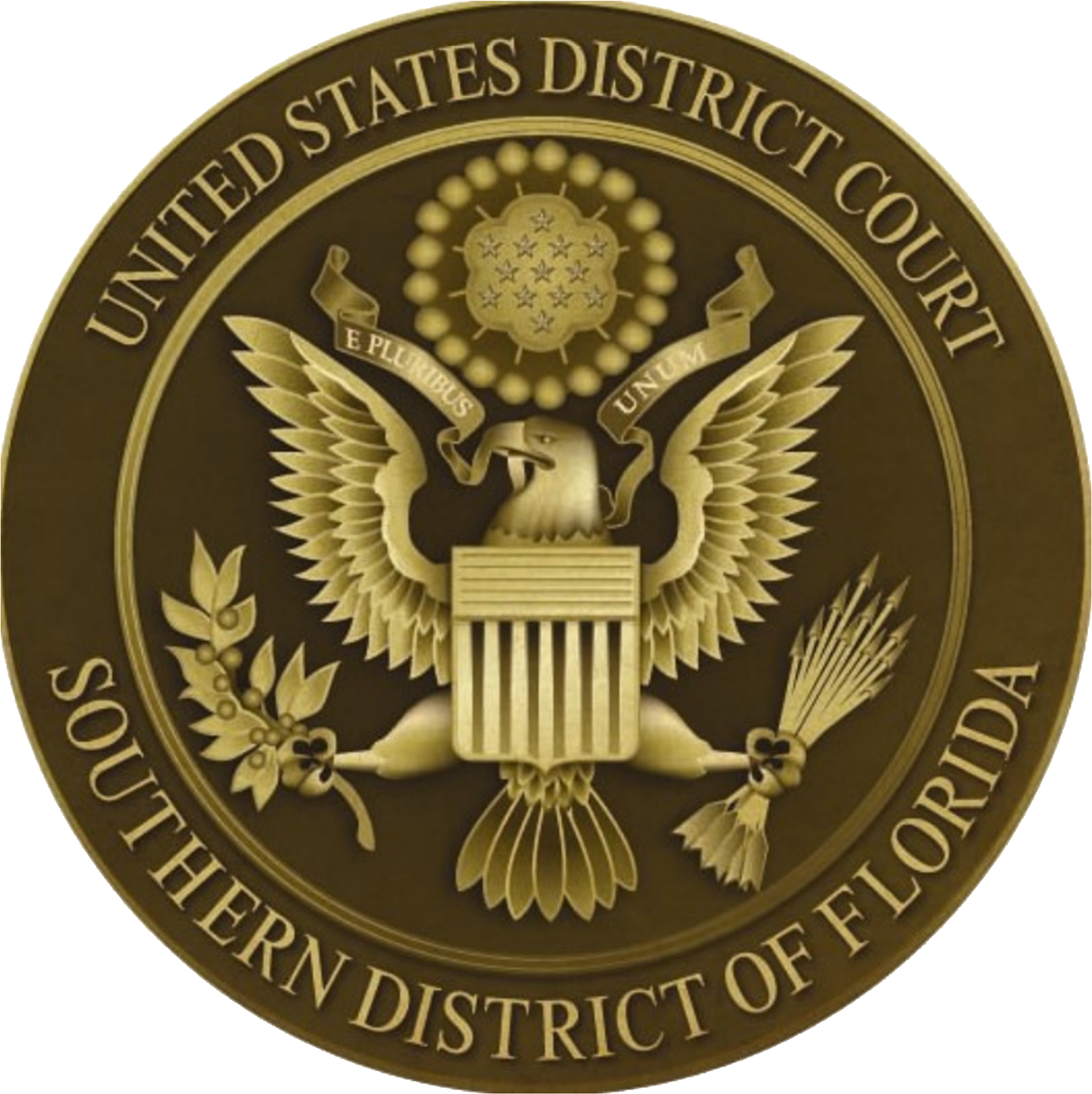
- Court: Southern District of Florida
- Started: March 18, 2024
- Docket nos.: 1:24-cv-21050

Outcome
- Case closed in December 2024 following settlement

Court membership
- Judge sitting: Cecilia Altonaga

In December 2024, ABC's owner, the Walt Disney Company, settled a defamation lawsuit brought by Donald Trump against ABC News, by agreeing to donate $15 million to Trump's future presidential library foundation and paying $1 million in Trump's legal fees. Disney also agreed to ABC and anchor George Stephanopoulos publishing a statement saying they regretted that Stephanopoulos, in an interview, had repeatedly said that Trump had been found liable for raping E. Jean Carroll.

US President Donald Trump, in 2025, says "I think the license should be taken away from ABC"

In November 2025, President Donald Trump became angry with an ABC News reporter for asking a question about the Jeffrey Epstein case and called for the revocation of the network's broadcasting license.

== Programming ==
=== Current ABC News programs ===
- ABC World News Tonight (1978–present)
- 20/20 (1978–present)
- Good Morning America First Look (1982–present)
- Good Morning America (1975–present)
- Good Morning America Weekend (1993–present)
- GMA3 (2018–present)
- Nightline (1980–present)
- This Week (1981–present)
- World News Now (1992–present)

=== Former ABC News programs ===
==== Newscast programs ====
- After the Deadlines (1951–1952)
- ABC News Weekend Report (1970s–1991)
- AM America (1975)
- Business World (1987–1990)
- Good Afternoon America (2012)
- The Health Show (1987–89)
- Turning Point (1994–1999)

==== Newsmagazines ====
- Open Hearing (1957–1958)
- Our World (1986–1987)
- 20/20 Downtown (1999–2001)
- Closeup (1960–1988)
- Day One (1993–1995)
- Primetime (1989–2012)
- Primetime Thursday (2000–2002)
- Turning Point (1994–1999)
- I-Caught (2007)

==== Public affairs ====
- College News Conference (1952–1960)
- Answers for Americans (1953–1954)
- Issues and Answers (1960–1981)

==== Digital programs ====
- The Debrief (2018–2019)
- The Briefing Room (2018–2019)
- 10% Happier (video broadcast of 10% Happier podcast) (2015–2017)
- Real Biz with Rebecca Jarvis (2014–2017)

=== Other programs ===
- Discovery (1962–1971)
- Make a Wish (1971–1976)
- Animals, Animals, Animals (1976–1981)
- Biography (1987–2005)
- Peter Jennings Reporting (1990–2005)
- Intimate Portrait (1994–2005) (co-production with Gay Rosenthal Productions)
- The Century: America's Time (1999)
- ABC 2000 Today (1999–2000)
- Medical Mysteries (2006–2008)
- NASCAR in Primetime (2007)
- What Would You Do? (formerly Primetime: What Would You Do?) (2008–2020, 2024–present)
- Popcorn with Peter Traves (2009–present)
- The Generic Detective (2020)
- The Con (2020–2022) (co-production with The Intellectual Property Corporation)
- Wild Crimes (2021)
- City of Angels | City of Death (2021) (co-production with Highway 41 Productions)
- Let the World See (2022)
- Have You Seen This Man? (2022)
- Keeper of the Ashes: The Oklahoma Girl Scout Murders (2022)
- Mormon No More (2022)
- The Murders Before the Marathon (2022) (co-production with Anonymous Content and Story Syndicate)
- Where Is Private Dulaney? (2022–present) (co-production with Show of Force and Versus Pictures)
- Death in the Dorms (2023)
- Web of Death (2023)

== Other services ==
=== ABC News Radio ===
ABC News Radio is the radio service of ABC Audio, a division of the ABC News. Formerly known as ABC Radio News, ABC News Radio feeds through Skyview Networks with newscasts on the hour to its affiliates. ABC News Radio is the largest commercial radio news organization in the US.

=== ABCNews.com ===
ABCNews.com launched on May 15, 1997, by ABC News Internet Ventures, a joint venture between Starwave and ABC formed in April 1997. Starwave had owned and operated ESPNet SportsZone (later known as ESPN.com) since 1995, which licensed the ESPN brand and video clips from ABC's corporate sister ESPN Inc. Disney wanted more control of their Internet properties, which meant ABCNews.com was operated as a joint venture with ABC News having editorial control. Disney had also bought a minority stake in Starwave before the launch of ABCNews.com and would later buy the company outright.

The website initially had a dedicated staff of about 30. In addition to articles, it featured short video clips and audio from the start, delivered using RealAudio and RealVideo technology. Some content was also available via America Online. In 2011, ABC News and Yahoo News announced a strategic partnership to share ABC's online reporting on Yahoo's website; the deal expanded in 2015 to include the Disney/ABC Television Group. In 2018, ABC News, and Good Morning America specifically, ended the hosting partnership with Yahoo, instead opting to continue separate web presences.

=== ABC News Live ===
ABC News Live is a 24/7 streaming video news channel for breaking news, live events, newscasts and longer-form reports and documentaries operated by ABC News since 2018, The channel is available through DirecTV Stream, Disney+, FuboTV, Google TV, Haystack News, Hulu, LG Channels, Pluto TV, Prime Video Live TV, Samsung TV Plus, Sling Freestream, The Roku Channel, Tubi, Vizio Watch Free+, Xumo, and YouTube TV. The service is under the direction of Justin Dial, Vice President of Streaming Content, Seniboye Tienabeso, Executive Director of ABC News Live, Chandra Zeikel, Executive Producer and Eric Ortega, Executive Producer.

This unit is producing:

- ABC News Live First, a daily four hour live morning show anchored by Diane Macedo from 8:00 a.m. to 12:00 p.m. (Eastern Time)
- ABC News Live, a daily four hour afternoon show anchored by Kyra Phillips from 12:00–4:00 p.m. (Eastern Time)
- ABC News Live Reports, a daily two hour afternoon show anchored by Kayna Whitworth from 5:00–7:00 p.m. (Eastern Time) (September 2023–)
- ABC News Live Prime, a nightly 90 minute news programmed anchored by Linsey Davis starting at 7:00 p.m. (Eastern Time) (February 2020–)
- GMA: The Third Hour, a weekday, hour-long daytime news program on ABC. It premiered in March 2020 as Pandemic: What You Need To Know, as a temporary replacement for its talk show Strahan, Sara and Keke to cover the onset of the Coronavirus pandemic in the United States. It has since replaced indefinitely. The program is currently anchored by various ABC News personalities following a major overhaul.

=== Former ===
==== Satellite News Channel ====
Satellite News Channel was a joint venture between ABC News and Group W that launched on June 21, 1982, as a satellite-delivered cable television network. SNC used footage from ABC News and seven Washington, D.C.–based crews and stories from other overseas networks to provide a rotating newscast every 20 minutes. However, this channel had difficulty getting clearance from cable systems, so ABC News and Group W decided to sell it to its competitor, CNN (a subsidiary of Time Warner's Turner Broadcasting System). CNN ceased Satellite News Channel's operations on October 27, 1983. SNC was either replaced by CNN or CNN2 on most cable systems.

==== ABC News Now ====
ABC News Now was a 24-hour cable news network that launched on July 26, 2004, as a digital subchannel by ABC News, being the company's second attempt in the 24-hour cable news world after Satellite News Channel. It was offered via digital television, broadband and streaming video at ABCNews.com and on mobile phones. It delivered breaking news, headline news each half hour, and a wide range of entertainment and lifestyle programming. The channel was available in the United States and Europe. Its Talk Back feature allowed viewers to voice their input by submitting videos and personal thoughts on controversial issues and current topics. It was shut down as a digital subchannel after its experimental phase ended with the Presidential inauguration in 2005. ABC News Now was replaced on cable providers with Fusion on October 28, 2013.

==== Fusion ====
Fusion was a digital cable and satellite network owned and operated by Fusion Media Group, LLC, which was a joint venture between ABC News and Univision Communications. ABC and Univision formally announced their launch on May 2, 2012. Launched on October 28, 2013, Fusion features a mix of traditional news and investigative programs along with satirical content aimed at English-speaking Hispanic and Latino American adults between the ages of 18 and 34. The network replaced ABC News Now, a mainly streaming service of ABC News content. In December 2015, it was reported that Disney was in talks to sell its stake in Fusion to Univision. The split was complete on April 21, 2016; Univision alone would continue to operate Fusion until December 31, 2021, when it shut down the network.

== Settlement of Donald Trump 2024 defamation suit ==
In March 2024, Donald Trump filed a defamation lawsuit against ABC News and George Stephanopoulos for defamation, alleging that Stephanopoulos's statements during an interview of Trump on This Week were "false, intentional, malicious and designed to cause harm". Journalist E. Jean Carroll had sued Trump for rape and sexual assault; the jury in the case, Carroll II, had found him liable for sexual assault and awarded Carroll $5 million in damages. In July, ABC News moved to dismiss the case, citing Judge Kaplan's comments that Carroll's rape accusation was "substantially true"; the motion was rejected by the presiding judge. In December, after Trump had won the 2024 presidential election, ABC News settled the defamation lawsuit a day after a judge ruled that both Trump and Stephanopoulos were required to sit for depositions in the case.

Legal experts said that the settlement, which occurred prior to motions for summary judgments, was agreed to earlier than is typical in the pre-trial procedures of defamation cases. They said that it may have been linked to Trump's status as a president-elect or was negotiated to avoid turning over potentially damaging information in the discovery process. The New York Times reported that according to company insiders Disney leadership was concerned that a Trump-friendly jury in Florida might potentially award Trump a sum exceeding the settlement, to be followed by a risky appeals process.

The terms of the settlement required ABC News to pay $15 million to Trump's presidential library and $1 million to cover Trump's legal fees, as well as issue a public apology expressing regret for Stephanopoulos's inaccurate claims against Trump.

== Personnel ==
=== Current television anchors, correspondents, and reporters ===
New York (Main Headquarters)

- Dan Abrams – Chief Legal Analyst (2011–present)
- Rhiannon Ally – Co-Anchor, World News Now and Good Morning America First Look (2022–present); Correspondent (2021–present)
- Joy Behar – Friday Moderator & Co-Host, The View (1997–2013, 2015–present)
- Gio Benitez – Co-Anchor, Good Morning America: Weekend Edition (2023–present); Transportation Correspondent (2013–present)
- Sam Champion – Meteorologist WABC-TV; fill in meteorologist on Good Morning America (2006–2013, 2016–present)
- Juju Chang – Co-Anchor, Nightline (1996–present)
- Alexis Christoforous – Business Correspondent (2022–present)
- Linsey Davis – Anchor, ABC News Live Prime (2020–present); Anchor, World News Tonight Sunday (2021–present), Good Morning America and ABC World News Tonight Substitute Anchor (2007–present)
- Andrew Dymburt – Co-Anchor, World News Now and Good Morning America First Look (2021–present); Correspondent (2020–present)
- Will Ganss – Multi-Platform Reporter (2012–present)
- Whoopi Goldberg – Moderator & Co-Host, The View (2007–present)
- Alyssa Farah Griffin – Co-Host, The View (2022–present)
- Sara Haines – Co-Host, The View (2016–present); Correspondent (2013–present)
- Sunny Hostin – Co-Host, The View; Senior Legal Correspondent (2016–present)
- Rebecca Jarvis – Chief Business, Technology, and Economics Correspondent (2013–present)
- Whit Johnson – Co-Anchor, Good Morning America: Weekend Edition; Anchor, World News Tonight Saturday (2021–present), Good Morning America and ABC World News Tonight Substitute Anchor (2018–present)
- Aaron Katersky – Chief Investigative Correspondent (2003–present)
- CeFaan Kim – Correspondent/Correspondent, WABC-TV (2021–present)
- Diane Macedo – Anchor, ABC News Live First; Correspondent (2016–present)
- David Muir – Anchor and Managing Editor, World News Tonight (2014–present); Co-Anchor, 20/20 (2011–present); Anchor (2003–present)
- Ana Navarro – Co-Host, The View (2022–present); Political Commentator (2014–present)
- Byron Pitts – Co-Anchor, Nightline; Chief National Correspondent (2013–present)
- John Quiñones – Anchor, What Would You Do? (2008–present) Correspondent (1982–present)
- Will Reeve – Correspondent (2018–present)
- Deborah Roberts – Co–Anchor, 20/20 (2022–present); Senior National Affairs Correspondent (1995–present)
- Robin Roberts – Features Reporter, Good Morning America (1995–present) Co-Anchor, Good Morning America (2005–present); Anchor, The Year (2002–present)
- Diane Sawyer – Anchor (1989–present)
- Lara Spencer – Co-Anchor, Good Morning America (1999–2004; 2011–present)
- George Stephanopoulos – Co-Anchor, Good Morning America (2009–present); Anchor, This Week (1997–present)
- Michael Strahan – Co-Anchor, Good Morning America (2014–present)
- Somara Theodore – Weather Anchor, Good Morning America: Weekend Edition; Meteorologist
- Bob Woodruff – Military Correspondent (1996–present)
- Ginger Zee – Weather Anchor, Good Morning America (2013–present) and World News Tonight; Chief Meteorologist (2011–present)

Washington, D.C.

- Mary Bruce – Senior White House Correspondent, Weekday and Weekend Fill-In & Substitute Anchor (2006–present)
- John Donvan – Washington Correspondent (1980–1985, 1988–present)
- Devin Dwyer – Senior Washington Correspondent (2009–present)
- Jonathan Karl – Co-Anchor, This Week (2021–present); Chief Washington Correspondent (2003–present)
- Rick Klein – Vice President and Washington Bureau Chief (2007–present)
- Kyra Phillips – Anchor, ABC News Live; Correspondent (2018–present)
- Martha Raddatz – Co-Anchor, This Week (2016–present); Chief Global Affairs Correspondent (1999–present)
- Rachel Scott – Senior Political White House Correspondent, Weekday, Weekend Fill-In & Substitute Anchor (2016–present)
- Pierre Thomas – Chief Justice Correspondent (2000–present)
- Selina Wang – Senior White House Correspondent (2023–present)

Atlanta

- Steve Osunsami – Senior National Correspondent (1997–present)

London

- Lama Hasan – Foreign Correspondent (2000–present)
- James Longman – Chief International Correspondent (2017–present)

San Francisco

- Becky Worley – Consumer Correspondent; Technology Contributor (2005–present)

Current ABC News Radio personnel

- Michelle Franzen – Midday Anchor
- Steven Portnoy – Washington DC-based National Correspondent, ABC News Radio
- Alex Stone – Los Angeles-based and Phoenix-based Correspondent, ABC News Radio (2004–present)

Contributors

- Donna Brazile – Contributor, This Week
- Chris Connelly – Contributor, Good Morning America and 20/20 (1980–1988; 2000–present)
- Darrell Blocker – Contributor, Good Morning America and This Week
- Chris Christie – Contributor (2018–present)

=== Former ===
- Mona Kosar Abdi (2019–2023)
- Sharyn Alfonsi (2008–2011)
- Christiane Amanpour (2010–2012)
- Jack Anderson
- Roone Arledge
- Jennifer Ashton (2011–2024)
- Thalia Assuras
- Jim Avila
- Ashleigh Banfield (1991–1993)
- Adrienne Bankert (2016–2021)
- Rona Barrett (1966–1980)
- Mike Barz
- Martin Bashir (2005–2010)
- Willow Bay (1994–1998)
- Steve Bell
- Jules Bergman
- John Berman (1995–2012)
- Richard E. Besser (2009–2017)
- Bill Beutel
- Charles Bierbauer
- Deirdre Bolton (2020–2023)
- Erma Bombeck
- Abbie Boudreau (2010–2019)
- Howard Bragman
- David Brinkley
- David Brooks
- Hilary Brown (1973–1977, 1981–1984, 1992–2009)
- Aaron Brown
- Hal Bruno
- Chris Bury (1982–2013)
- Andrea Canning (2004–2012)
- Marysol Castro (2004–2010)
- David Chalian
- Rebecca Chase
- Sylvia Chase
- Leo Cherne
- Julia Child (1980–2001)
- Liz Cho
- Spencer Christian (1986–1998)
- Connie Chung (1998–2001)
- Ron Claiborne (1986–2018)
- Bob Clark
- John Coleman
- Ron Cochran (1963–1965)
- Pat Collins (1972–1977)
- Ann Compton (1973–2014)
- Bertha Coombs (1997–2002)
- Anderson Cooper (1995–2000)
- Nancy Cordes
- Dan Cordtz (1974–1989)
- Ron Corning
- Katie Couric (2011–2014)
- Catherine Crier
- Mort Crim (late 1960s–early 1970s)
- Chris Cuomo (early 2000s–2013)
- Don Dahler (1999–2001)
- John Daly (1952–1960)
- Ted David
- Morton Dean (1988–2002)
- Arnold Diaz (1995–2003)
- Greg Dobbs (1969–1992)
- Sam Donaldson (1967–2009)
- Linda Douglass
- Matthew Dowd
- Bill Downs
- Hugh Downs (1978–1999)
- Barrie Dunsmore
- Nancy Dussault (1975–1977)
- Stephanie Edwards
- Linda Ellerbee (1986–1987)
- Josh Elliott (2011–2014)
- David Ensor
- Paula Faris (2012–2018)
- Gillian Findlay
- Lisa Fletcher
- Jami Floyd (1998–2005)
- Jack Ford (1999–2002)
- Marshall Frady
- Pauline Frederick
- Ray Gandolf
- David Garcia
- Anne Garrels
- Charles Gibson (1975–2009)
- Kendis Gibson (2013–2019)
- Richard Gizbert
- Charles Glass (1973–1976, 1983–1993)
- Don Goddard
- Bianna Golodryga
- Marci Gonzalez (2013–2021)
- Jeff Greenfield
- Bill Greenwood
- Roger Grimsby
- Gil Gross (1971–2011)
- Matt Gutman (2005–2025)
- David Hartman (1975–1987)
- Dan Harris (2000–2021)
- Kaylee Hartung (2019–2023)
- Elisabeth Hasselbeck (2003–2013)
- Sandy Hill
- Brandi Hitt
- John Hockenberry
- T. J. Holmes (2014–2023)
- Lisa Howard
- Quincy Howe
- Brit Hume (1973–1996)
- Bob Jamieson (1990–2008)
- Linzie Janis (2013–2018)
- Tom Jarriel (1964–2002)
- Peter Jennings (1964–2005)
- Timothy Johnson (1975–2012)
- Star Jones (1997–2006)
- Jackie Judd (1987–2003)
- Larry Kane (1965–1978)
- Ken Kashiwahara (1972–1998)
- Herb Kaplow
- Neal Karlinsky (2000–2017)
- David Kerley (2004–2020)
- Jim Kincaid
- Dana King
- Christianne Klein
- Dan Kloeffler
- Jeffrey Kofman
- Ted Koppel (1963–2005)
- Robert Krulwich
- Peter Lance (1973–1987)
- Bill Lawrence
- Elisabeth Leamy
- Lisa Ling (1999–2002)
- Tom Llamas (2014–2021)
- Joan Lunden (1975–2000)
- Lauren Lyster
- Vicki Mabrey
- Catherine Mackin
- John MacVane
- Sheila MacVicar
- Rob Marciano (2014–2024)
- Liz Marlantes
- Dave Marash
- Miguel Marquez
- Michel Martin
- Rachel Martin
- Debbie Matenopoulos (1997–1999)
- Andrea McCarren
- Terry McCarthy
- Cynthia McFadden
- Lisa McRee
- John McWethy
- John Miller
- Antonio Mora
- Terry Moran (1997–2025)
- DeMarco Morgan (2022–2025)
- Edward P. Morgan
- Geoff Morrell
- Judy Muller (1990–2005)
- Ben Mulroney
- Vinita Nair
- Heather Nauert
- Amna Nawaz
- Rob Nelson
- Kevin Newman (1994–2001)
- Reena Ninan
- Michele Norris
- Bill O'Reilly
- Ryan Owens
- Jesse Palmer
- Keke Palmer
- Tara Palmeri
- Perri Peltz
- Tony Perkins (1980s–1985, 1999–2005)
- Indra Petersons
- Stone Phillips (1980–1992)
- Eva Pilgrim (2012–2025)
- Morgan Radford
- Vic Ratner (1973–2014)
- Harry Reasoner
- Dean Reynolds (1984–2007)
- Frank Reynolds
- Bill Ritter
- Geraldo Rivera
- Tanya Rivero
- Amy Robach (2012–2023)
- Cokie Roberts
- Max Robinson
- Judd Rose
- Brian Ross (1994–2018)
- Louis Rukeyser
- Pierre Salinger
- Marlene Sanders
- Forrest Sawyer
- Dick Schaap
- Jay Schadler (1981–2015)
- John Scali
- Mara Schiavocampo
- Nick Schifrin
- David Schoumacher
- John Schriffen
- Mike Schneider
- Jim Sciutto
- Martin Seemungal
- Barry Serafin (1979–2004)
- Lara Setrakian
- Bill Shadel
- Bernard Shaw
- Sherri Shepherd (2007–2014)
- Lynn Sherr (1977–2008)
- Claire Shipman
- Lewis Shollenberger
- Joel Siegel
- Nate Silver (2018–2023)
- Carole Simpson (1982–2006)
- Howard K. Smith
- Rachel Smith
- Kate Snow (2003–2010)
- Nancy Snyderman
- Hari Sreenivasan
- Betsy Stark
- Alison Stewart
- Bill Stewart
- John Stossel
- Kathleen Sullivan
- Stephanie Sy
- John Cameron Swayze
- Jake Tapper
- Fred Thompson
- Richard Threlkeld
- Jeffrey Toobin
- Lem Tucker
- Garrick Utley
- Sander Vanocur
- Elizabeth Vargas (1996–2018)
- Cecilia Vega (2011–2023)
- Meredith Vieira (1994–2006)
- Chris Wallace
- Clarissa Ward
- Barbara Walters
- Peggy Wehmeyer
- Bill Weir (1998–2012)
- George Will
- Jim Wooten
- David Wright (2000–2021)
- John Yang
- Jessica Yellin
- Bob Young
- Paula Zahn
- Jeff Zeleny
- Dave Zinczenko

In Australia, Sky News Australia airs daily broadcasts of ABC World News Tonight (at 10:30 a.m.) and Nightline (at 1:30 a.m.) as well as weekly airings of 20/20 (on Wednesdays at 1:30 p.m., with an extended version at 2:00 p.m. on Sundays) and occasionally Primetime (at 1:30 p.m. on Thursdays, with extended edition at 2:00 p.m. on Saturdays). Coincidentally, that country's public broadcasting, the Australian Broadcasting Corporation, operates its unrelated news division that is also named ABC News. The U.S. ABC News maintains a content-sharing agreement with the Nine Network, which also broadcasts GMA domestically in the early morning before its own breakfast program.
