= ABC Audio =

American radio network

- Country: United States

Ownership
- Owner: ABC News (Disney Entertainment)

History
- Founded: January 1, 2015 (11 years ago)
- Launch date: January 1, 2015
- Former names: ABC Radio (2015–2019)

Coverage
- Availability: Available on select radio affiliates

Links
- Website: abcaudio.com

ABC Audio is a radio syndicator, radio network and digital audio network in the United States. It is under the ownership of the Walt Disney Company, parent company of American Broadcasting Company (ABC), with satellite distribution being handled by Linkup Communications. It launched on January 1, 2015, as ABC Radio; it was renamed ABC Audio in 2019.

== Background ==
ABC Radio originally began after the split of NBC Red and NBC Blue (later Blue Network) networks with ABC taking over operations of the latter from RCA in 1943 before adopting its name 2 years later. ABC Radio was known to broadcast the first nationwide report of the assassination of President John F. Kennedy. Kennedy was shot in a motorcade in Dallas, Texas, at 18:30 UTC on November 22, 1963, and ABC Radio's Don Gardiner anchored the network's initial bulletin at 18:36:50 UTC, minutes before any other radio or television network followed suit.

The networks associated with ABC included Watermark Inc. (which ABC bought in 1982), Satellite Music Network (a 1989 purchase), ESPN Radio (launched in 1992) and Radio Disney (debuted in 1996).

Despite a number of different owners (Capital Cities Communications and later Disney), the radio division remained under ABC's wing until June 12, 2007, when it was sold to Citadel Broadcasting as well as most of its O&O stations in a restructuring effort. Under the terms of the reverse Morris trust, ABC shareholders held a controlling stake in Citadel, who licensed the ABC name for two more years until it rebranded as Citadel Media Networks in 2009.

On September 16, 2011, Cumulus Media purchased Citadel Broadcasting and rebranded the network division as Cumulus Media Networks. In 2013, Cumulus Media Networks merged with Dial Global Radio Networks to form the current Westwood One.

ABC maintained ownership of its Radio Disney network and its ESPN Radio owned-and-operated stations. In 2015, it announced plans to sell off all but one of its Radio Disney station licenses and stop distributing that network through terrestrial radio. The network succeeded in selling off most of its stations, leaving only KRDC; KRDC flipped to a country music format separate from the Radio Disney network but still carrying the Radio Disney brand. Its license, along with ESPN Radio's KSPN, have remained held by "ABC Radio Los Angeles Assets." ABC completed the sale of KRDC in 2023. The ESPN Radio network and its remaining owned-and-operated stations would be sold to Good Karma Brands, with ESPN maintaining the intellectual property ownership over the network.

== History ==
=== ABC Radio ===
ABC Radio logo from 2015 to 2019

On August 7, 2014, ABC announced that it would relaunch its radio network division on January 1, 2015. The change occurred following the announcement that Cumulus would replace its ABC News radio service with Westwood One News (via CNN). ABC will continue to make its radio news programming (via ABC News Radio and its FM counterpart ABC News Now) available through the network, and will also expand to create new radio programming based on other ABC owned properties such as Good Morning America, Dancing With The Stars and Jimmy Kimmel Live. Skyview Networks would handle advertising sales and satellite distribution.

By December 23, 2014, ABC News had signed up over 1,000 affiliated stations for at least one of ABC News, ABC Digital and ABC Air Power networks. This included 200 new affiliates and multiple stations affiliating with more than one service. Major new key affiliates added included WTOP-FM, WGN and KFI.

In April 2018, ABC announced that it planned to develop new syndicated radio programs with Skyview. The pair made a deal in August 2018 to syndicate “The Dana Cortez Show” morning show formerly on “98.5 The Beat” KBBT San Antonio.

Around 2015, ABC News began experimenting with podcasts and added an audio channel to its app. On March 28, 2018, the company began its first daily podcast, Start Here. Paula Faris launched a podcast on November 13, 2018, with three episodes of Journeys of Faith.

Local Radio Networks moved its twelve 24/7 music formats on January 1, 2019, to ABC Radio for marketing and talent sharing and Skyview Networks for satellite distribution. ABC News Radio programming was previously offered to Local Radio affiliates.

Vice president and general manager Steve Jones left April 4, 2019 to work at Skyview. For the interim, four ABC News executive would head up ABC Radio: ABC News executive director, programming/news coverage Andrew Kalb, ABC News senior manager, business development Abe Velez, ABC Radio director of affiliate relations Heidi Oringer and ABC News Radio executive director of operations Jeff Fitzgerald. He was replaced in May 2019 by Stacia Philips Deshishku promoted from the position of Washington Deputy Bureau Chief.

=== ABC Audio ===
ABC Audio logo from 2019 to 2021

On September 20, 2019, ABC Radio was renamed ABC Audio as the network has evolved to offer a podcast portfolio and other forms of on-demand and linear content. Vice president Deshishku, who made the announcement acknowledges that "the power of radio remains critical to our business, as does the ABC News Radio brand within ABC Audio." In March 2020, ABC Audio indicated that ESPN Audio would take over podcast ad sales.

== Programs and services ==
- ABC News Radio
  - ABC News Now
- ABC Air Power
- The Deja Vu Show
- ABC Digital
- ABC Sports Radio
- Perspective
- This Week
- World News This Week
- Your Body with Dr. Jen Ashton

=== Podcasts ===
- 10% Happier with Dan Harris (March 11, 2016–present)
- 20/20 (November 4, 2017–present)
- COVID-19 Immunity in Our Community (March 31, 2021-present)
- Cutthroat, Inc. (March 26, 2020-May 7, 2020). 7 episodes.
- The Dropout (January 22, 2019-February 26, 2019)
- Everybody's Got Something (September 19, 2016–present)
- The Essentials: Inside the Curve (April 20, 2020-June 13, 2020). 10 episodes.
- Have You Seen This Man? (October 23, 2019-November 19, 2020). 7 episodes.
- The HeirPod (October 3, 2019—present) ABC News Royal Contributor Omid Scobie hosts
- In Plain Sight: Lady Bird Johnson (March 1, 2021-April 12, 2021). 8 episodes.
- Inside Frozen 2 (November 11, 2019-December 9, 2020). 7 episodes.
- Inside the Midnight Order (July 11, 2024-August 8, 2024)
- Inside the Oscars (March 25, 2021-April 26, 2021). 6 episodes.
- The Investigation (February 11, 2019-February 7, 2020)
- Journeys of Faith (November 13, 2018-April 21, 2020) ten episodes with 3 premiere episodes
- A Killing on The Cape (October 25, 2017–November 29, 2017). 6 episodes.
- Life After Suicide (May 1, 2019-June 18, 2019)
- Motivated (June 26, 2017–December 31, 2017)
- A Murder on Orchard Street (October 3, 2017–November 30, 2017). 8 episodes.
- Nightline (November 30, 2017–present)
- No Limits with Rebecca Jarvis (January 9, 2017–December 29, 2019). 145 episodes.
- Perspective (November 9, 2017–present)
- Popcorn with Peter Travers (August 26, 2016–present)
- Pop Culture Moms (February 27, 2024-present)
- Powerhouse Politics (February 19, 2016–present)
- Radioactive: The Karen Silkwood Story (November 12, 2024-present)
- Reclaimed: The Forgotten Years (October 2, 2023-October 30, 2023)
- Reclaimed: The Lifeblood of Navajo Nation (November 10, 2024-present)
- Reclaimed: The Story of Mamie Till-Mobley
- This Week with George Stephanopoulos (November 12, 2017–present)
- Truth and Lies: Jeffrey Epstein (January 9, 2020-July 10, 2020). 10 episodes.
- Tulsa's Buried Truch (April 6, 2021-April 20, 2021). 3 episodes.
- Uncomfortable (March 21, 2017–March 12, 2018)
- The View
- World News This Week (November 3, 2017–present)
- World News Tonight with David Muir (December 1, 2017–present)
- Start Here (March 28, 2018 – present) a twenty-minute audio cast hosted by Brad Mielke
