= Bill Greenwood =

Bill Greenwood may refer to:

- Bill Greenwood (baseball) (1857–1902), American professional baseball player
- Bill Greenwood (cricketer) (1909–1979), English cricketer
- Bill Greenwood (reporter) (1942–2020), American reporter for ABC News
