= David Ensor =

David Ensor may refer to:

- David Ensor (politician) (1906–1987), British actor and Labour Party politician, Member of Parliament for Bury and Radcliffe 1964–1970
- David Ensor (journalist), Group Exec. Vice President for Communications at Mercuria Energy Group. Former security correspondent for CNN
