= ABC News Now (radio network) =

Radio news network

- Type: Radio network
- Country: United States
- Availability: National, but not available in all areas
- Owner: ABC Audio (through ABC News)
- Launch date: 2006
- Official website: abcnewsnowradio.com

ABC News Now is an Internet-delivered news radio that is currently owned by The Walt Disney Company's ABC Audio division. The network was previously distributed by Cumulus Media Networks (through Cumulus Media) and licensed the ABC branding from Disney (which produces the network's programming via its ABC News Radio unit) until the end of 2014 when Cumulus launched its own in-house news division from its newly acquired Westwood One radio network. "ABC News Now" draws a music audience between the ages of 25 and 54 with the latest news interlined into the individual affiliates' music playlist.

According to a survey taken, 73% of the listeners were interested in news and many were mostly interested in hard news over lifestyles and headlines over in-depth reporting.

== History ==
Previous "ABC FM News" logo used until late 2010.

When The Walt Disney Company still owned the original ABC Radio Networks, it launched the network as ABC FM News on a dozen affiliates in 2006 with the news beginning at :15 past the hour, but due to low ratings and the fact that ABC News is distributed hourly on thousands of AM radio affiliates, the FM news unit was discontinued in early 2007. However shortly after the ABC/Citadel merger, the "FM" network was reactivated. Depending on the current affiliates, times may vary. In December 2010, the network was changed to "ABC News Now". Despite having the same name as the now-former digital TV network, they were not owned by the same broadcasting company at the time the TV network was still active.

Logo in 2014

Starting in 2015, this network is brought back under Disney's wing after ABC Radio was relaunched.

Each newscast ends with the "This is <optional mentioning of a newsreader's name>, ABC News" end cue. Some FM stations that carry ABC News Now—including WLNG in Sag Harbor, New York—use the alternate opening where a newsreader mentions the "ABC News" branding without the "Now" part.

== Current affiliates ==
- WLNG (Sag Harbor, New York)
- WKOZ-FM (Carthage, Mississippi)
