= Dion Lim =

American journalist

- Born: Michigan, U.S.
- Education: Emerson College
- Occupation: News reporter
- Employer: KGO-TV

Dion Lim is an American news anchor and former reporter/anchor for KGO-TV/ABC7. She is known for reporting on violence against Asian Americans.

== Early life ==
Lim was born in Michigan and moved to Connecticut as a teenager. She often states, including in her first book published by McGraw-Hill, being one of only a handful of Asian Americans in her predominantly white communities.

== Career ==
Lim's first on-air job was in Springfield, Massachusetts, and she was then offered a job as an anchor in Kansas City. Lim also worked as a news anchor in Charlotte, North Carolina, and the Tampa Bay area of Florida. While working, she faced racism from viewers, including being compared to Connie Chung.

Lim was working for KGO-TV when the COVID-19 pandemic began. She had reported on previous attacks on Asians, such as the attack on an elderly man collecting cans in San Francisco, but she saw instances of anti-Asian sentiment increasing during the pandemic. She wrote in an op-ed that reporting on these attacks gave her purpose. In an interview with Lawrence Yee and J. Clara Chan of TheWrap, she and fellow journalist CeFaan Kim spoke about the experience of being Asian American journalists reporting on the subject. She was also interviewed about her coverage of anti-Asian violence on a PBS NewsHour segment.

In January 2021, she conducted an interview with Chesa Boudin, the San Francisco district attorney. During the interview, Lim questioned him about a fatal car crash caused by 45-year-old Troy McAlister, a parolee Boudin's office had previously declined to charge following other infractions.

== Honors ==
- Named in nonprofit Gold House's list of 2021's 100 most impactful Asians and Pacific Islanders
- 2020 Emmy Award, Anchoring: "Three Hour Solo Anchoring, Gilroy Shooting"
- Certificate of Honor recipient from the San Francisco Board of Supervisors

== See also ==
- Xenophobia and racism related to the COVID-19 pandemic
