= Westwood One (disambiguation) =

Westwood One is an American radio network owned by Cumulus Media.

Westwood One may also refer to:

- Westwood One (1976-2011), previous incarnation of the radio network
- Westwood One News, a defunct radio news network operated by Westwood One
