= Liz Marlantes =

American broadcast journalist

Elizabeth Carol Marlantes
- Education: Harvard 1996 (magna cum laude) Am hist & lit Oxford University master's degree English literature
- Occupation: broadcast journalist
- Employer: ABC news
- Spouse: Nathan Scott Tyrrell (m. 2000) (Harvard 1995, cum laude)
- Parent(s): Carol W. and Dr. Lorian Louis Marlantes

Liz Marlantes is an ABC News Correspondent. She joined ABC News in February 2005 as a general assignment correspondent and is based in ABC News' Washington D.C. bureau.

Marlantes graduated magna cum laude from Harvard University. In 1996, where she studied American history and literature. She received a master's degree in English literature from Oxford University in England.

Marlantes began her journalism career in 1999 as a general assignment reporter and editor on the national news desk in Boston for the Christian Science Monitor. In 2004, Marlantes, along with her colleague, Abraham McLaughlin, won the Press Club's National Headliner Award for the series, "Vox Americana", about American attitudes prior to the Iraq War. During the 2004 presidential election Marlantes' work was noticed by Washington Post press watcher, Howard Kurtz, who opined that she was one of the bright, young journalists that is a rising star in journalism.

During her tenure at the Christian Science Monitor, Marlantes was often seen and heard providing commentary on news programs such as "This Week with George Stephanopoulos," "Nightline," "The McLaughlin Group," "The Chris Matthews Show," "Inside Politics," and "Wolf Blitzer Reports." She was a panel discussion member on "Fox News Sunday" roundtable in 2011 and 2012.

== See also ==
- ABC News
- This Week (USA)
