= Alexis Christoforous =

U.S. TV news correspondent

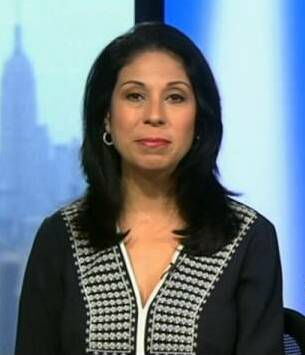
- Alexis in 2015
- Born: 19 October 1970 (age 55)
- Education: Fiorello H. LaGuardia High School of Music & Art and Performing Arts, New York University
- Occupations: Anchor, Correspondent
- Years active: 1994–present
- Employer: Bloomberg News
- Children: 3

Alexis Christoforous (born October 19, 1970) is a New York-based Correspondent for Bloomberg News. Prior to 2025, she previously reported for ABC News and CBS News.

Previously, she worked for Yahoo Finance as an Anchor and Correspondent, interviewing CEOs of Fortune 500 companies and covering major business events including The World Economic Forum in Davos, Switzerland, and the annual meeting of Warren Buffett's Berkshire Hathaway.

Prior to Yahoo Finance, she was an Anchor and Correspondent for CBS News where her reports were seen on CBS' "The Early Show", "CBS Evening News Weekend", "CBS News Sunday Morning with Charles Osgood" "CBS Up to the Minute," "CBS This Morning" as well as over 200 local CBS affiliate stations internationally. Her reports were also heard on the CBS Radio Network and WCBS Newsradio 880.

From 1999–2005 Christoforous was Anchor and Correspondent for CBS Marketwatch where she anchored the nationally syndicated program "MarketWatch Weekend." She was also a fill-in anchor for the local CBS affiliate, WCBS-TV, New York. In addition to her business reporting, Christoforous conducts many entertainment interviews including with Tony Bennett, Madonna, and Ringo Starr.

Her father is Greek-Cypriot and her mother is Italian-American.

Christoforous is a graduate of Fiorello H. LaGuardia High School of Music & Art and Performing Arts where she was a drama major. She graduated cum laude from New York University with a degree in Broadcast Journalism. She lives in New York City with her husband and three children.

From April 2022 to December 2025, Christoforous reported for ABC News. Her reports are featured across the ABC News platform including "ABC News Live", "Good Morning America"," "Nightline", ABC-TV affiliate stations, as well as the ABC Radio Network.

In 2026, she returned to Bloomberg for New York and Wall Street assignment reports, and co-anchoring for Bloomberg Radio's Bloomberg Surveillance.

== Early career ==
She began her business news career at Bloomberg Television and Radio in 1994, where she anchored the national PBS program "Bloomberg Morning News" and was Bloomberg's first reporter to report live from the floor of the New York Stock Exchange.

Christoforous covered the stock market bull run of the early 1990s and the subsequent Internet bubble burst of 2000. She reported on the economic impact of the September 11, 2001, attacks, the resignation of New York Stock Exchange CEO Richard Grasso and the wave of Wall Street scandals, including Enron, Worldcom and Martha Stewart.

== See also ==
- New Yorkers in journalism
