= Vic Ratner =

American journalist

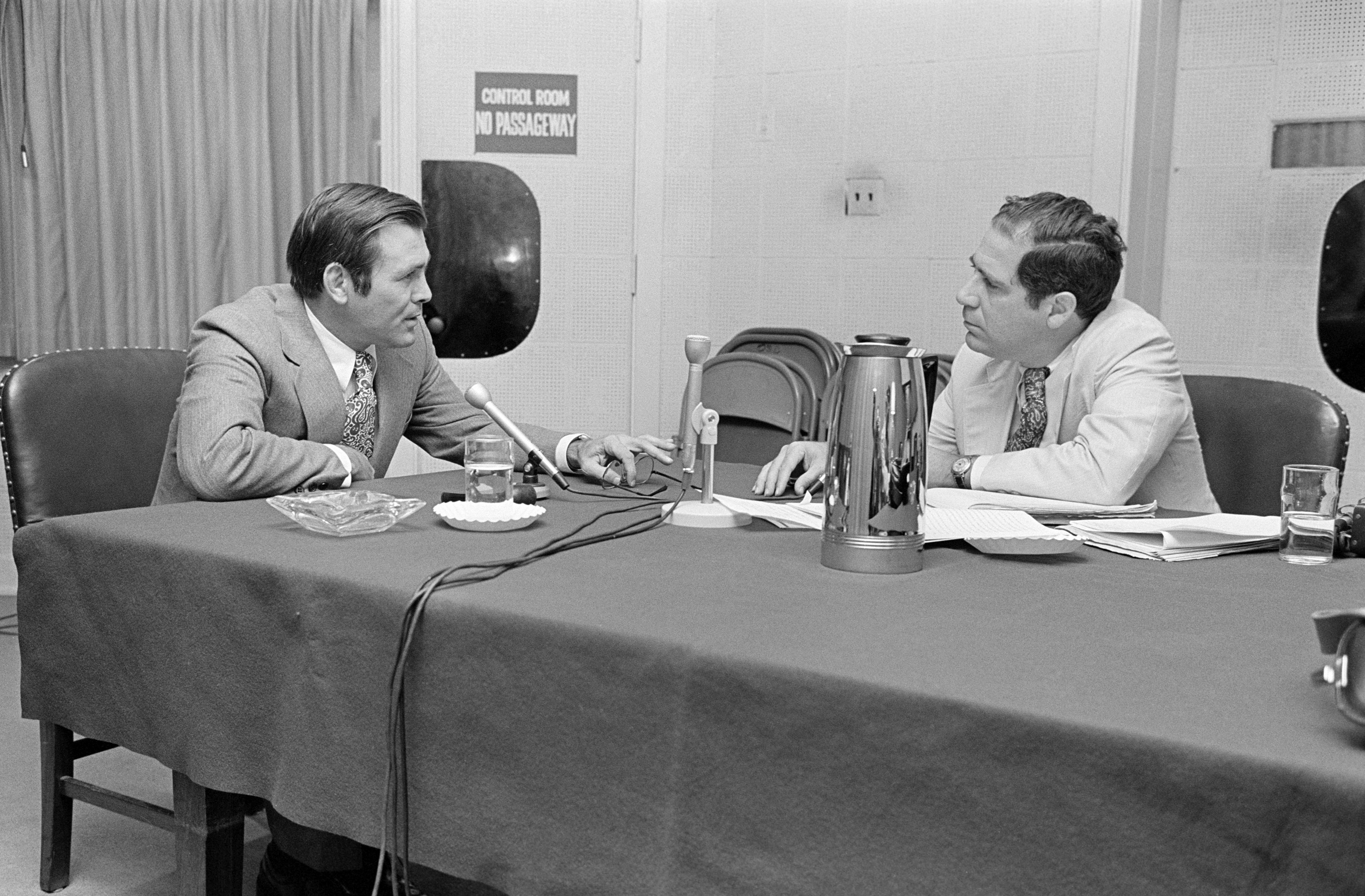
The Honorable Donald H. Rumsfeld (left), U.S. Secretary of Defense, is interviewed by Mr. Vic Rattner, ABC Radio News, in the Pentagon Studio, Washington, D.C., Jul. 19, 1976.

Vic Ratner has covered the news for ABC News Radio in 47 countries and 49 states. Named a general assignment correspondent for ABC News in 1973, he was primarily assigned to cover Congressional activities on Capitol Hill, but also reported on a variety of major news stories for World News This Morning, Good Morning America and the ABC Radio Networks.

Ratner was the lead Congressional correspondent for ABC Radio's extensive coverage of the impeachment investigation and trial of President Bill Clinton in 1999. That was his second impeachment assignment; upon joining ABC News, he covered the original Watergate burglary trial and the subsequent investigations, which led to the resignation of President Richard Nixon.

On assignment for Presidential Politics 2000, Ratner followed the major candidates of both political parties through major primary and caucus states. In 1992 and 1996, he was a floor reporter for ABC Radio at the Democratic & Republican conventions, and covered the Presidential campaigns and elections. He has covered the travels and crises of six American Presidents. He also played a key role in ABC News Radio's coverage of the Egypt Air and John F. Kennedy Jr. plane crashes.

A veteran space reporter, Ratner was the only radio network correspondent on the air live when the space shuttle Challenger blew up. He remained on the air that day for over five hours, providing on-the-scene information and background on the tragedy for ABC News audiences.

Previously Ratner served as correspondent, news director and anchor for radio and television stations in several major cities, including New York and Philadelphia. In 1997, he was the chairman of the executive committee of the House Radio Television Correspondents' Gallery (one of three press rooms or "galleries" serving as newsrooms for members of the media who cover the U.S. House of Representatives).

Ratner is the recipient of a number of awards for his work, including the prestigious Ohio State Award and the National Headliner Award. A native of New York City, he holds a master's in mass communications from the Annenberg School of Communications and a bachelor's in business from the University of Pennsylvania. While at the University of Pennsylvania, he was active on WXPN, which in those years was the student run and managed radio station serving Philadelphia and the Delaware Valley, where he broadcast news and other events with the same skill he further honed when he made radio news his career.

He resides with his wife, Judith, in Chevy Chase, MD. He retired from ABC News in January 2014.
