= Terry McCarthy (journalist) =

Nonprofit administrator (1961-)

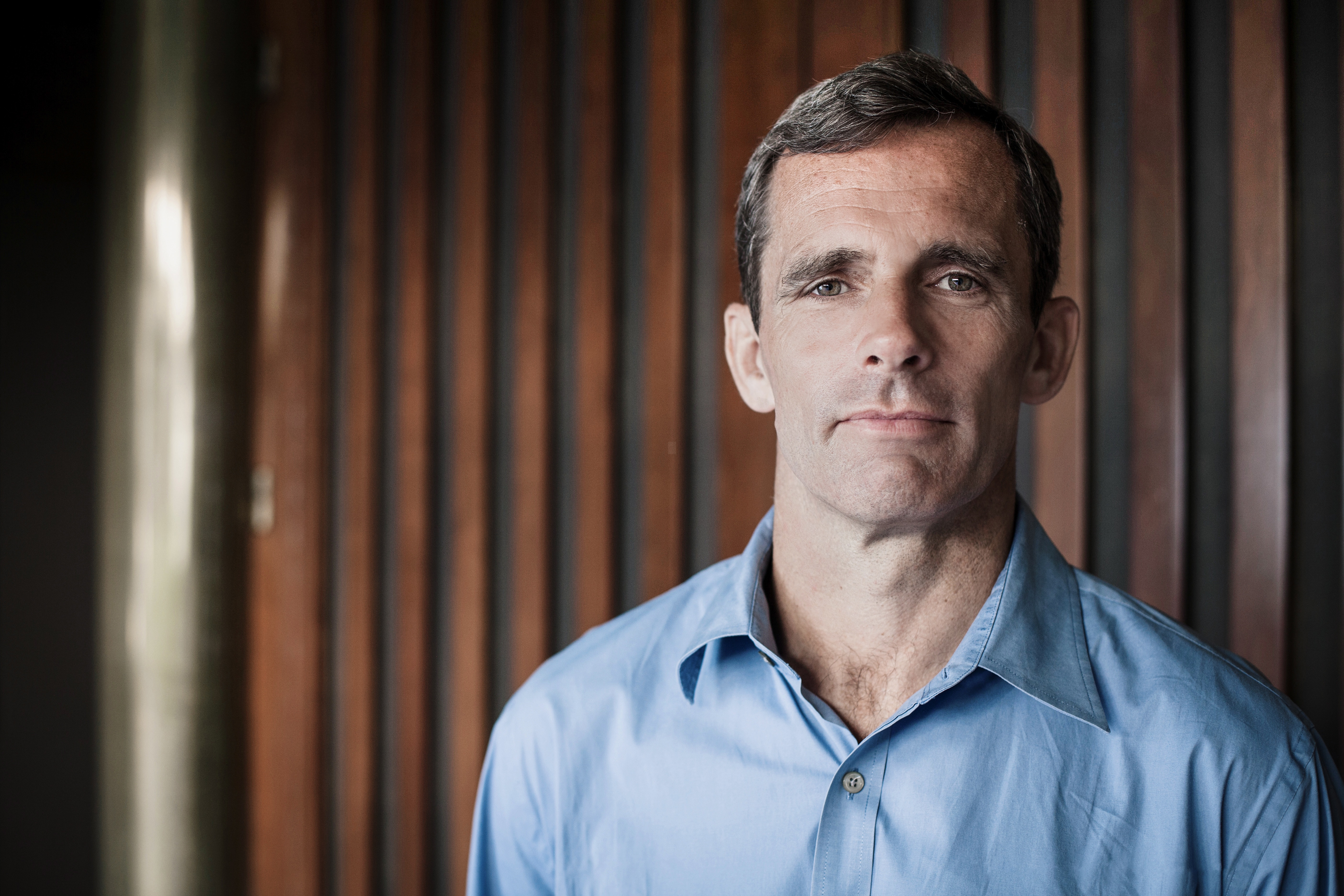
- Education: BA University College Dublin
- Occupations: Journalist; Writer; CEO
- Spouse: Jennifer McCarthy
- Children: 4

Terry McCarthy is CEO of the American Society of Cinematographers (ASC), where he oversees live events on films and TV series, as well as the ASC's technology committees, education programs, and the publishing of its 100-year old magazine, American Cinematographer. He previously headed the American Academy in Berlin and the Los Angeles World Affairs Council. McCarthy was a foreign correspondent based in Bangkok, Tokyo, Shanghai, Kabul and Baghdad, and won four Emmy Awards and an Edward R. Murrow Award. He has worked with The Independent, TIME Magazine, ABC News and CBS News.

== Career ==
=== Time ===
During his tenure at TIME (1998-2005), McCarthy served as the Los Angeles Bureau Chief and East Asia Correspondent in Shanghai. He wrote about China's internet and car industries, the fall of Indonesian dictator Suharto and the death of Khmer Rouge leader Pol Pot. From LA he did in-depth stories about the Green River serial killer in Seattle, the fight over new oil drilling in Alaska and the science of sharks. Immediately after 9/11 McCarthy went to Afghanistan to cover the ousting of the Taliban from Kabul, and in 2003 he covered the US invasion of Iraq. He set up TIME’s bureaus in Kabul and Baghdad. In both 2004 and 2005, McCarthy received an Emmy award for a joint ABC-Times News Series on Iraq.

=== ABC News ===
McCarthy was foreign correspondent for ABC News in the Middle East, Asia and Latin America from 2006 to 2009. He was the Principal Baghdad Correspondent during the US surge in Iraq and covered the trial and execution of Saddam Hussein. He traveled down the Yangtze River in China, focusing on the economic, political and environmental impact of the man-made waterway. He covered life in Mexico City during the swine flu epidemic of 2009, and filmed inside the eye of a category 4 hurricane off Florida in a C 130 hurricane hunter. In 2008, he won an Emmy for the series Iraq: Where Things Stand for ABC World News with Charlie Gibson.

=== CBS News ===
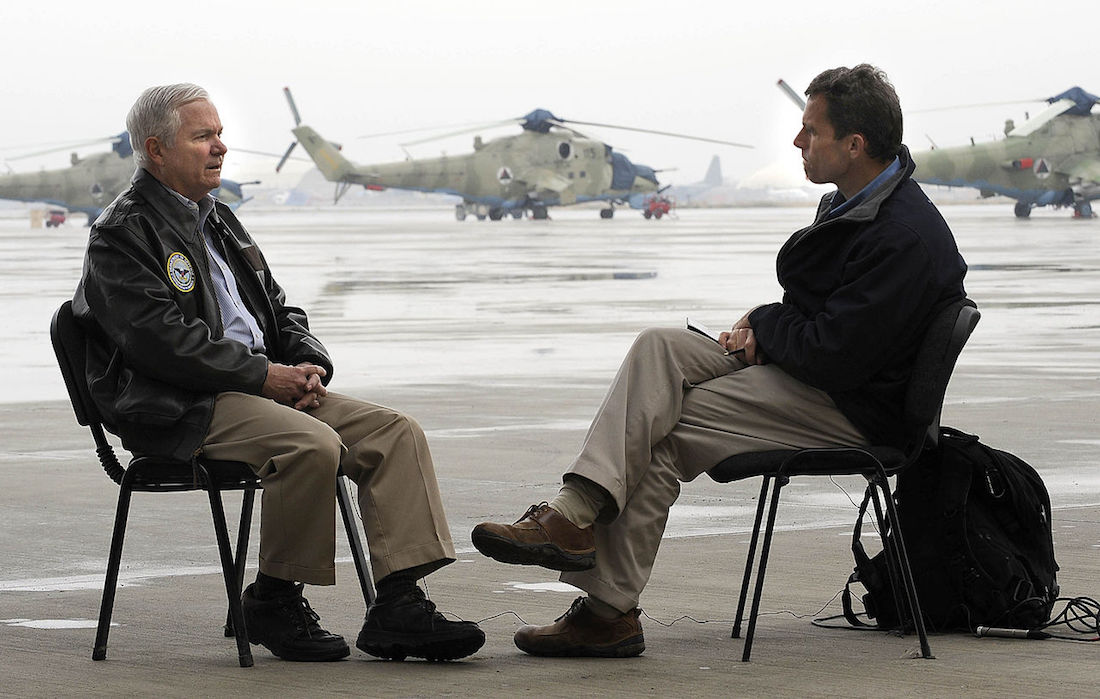
Secretary of Defense Robert Gates with Terry McCarthy

During his time at CBS News (2009-2011), McCarthy reported on the Middle East, Central Asia and China. While in Afghanistan, he was embedded with the 3rd Battalion 1st Marines, also known as the Thundering Third. His coverage focused on the 1st EOD Company, a team of Explosive Ordnance Disposal (bomb disposal) experts, which aired as part of the Afghanistan: The Road Ahead series on CBS Evening News with Katie Couric. He followed Egypt’s anti-Mubarak revolution in Cairo’s Tahrir Square, traced the steps of the al Qaeda “underpants bomber” in Yemen, traveled along China's Silk Road, reported on Shanghai's real estate boom and did in-depth reporting on cyber-attacks on US corporations. In 2011, McCarthy received an Emmy for Outstanding Continuing Coverage and the Edward R. Murrow Award for Video News Series for his work on the Afghan Bomb Squad.

=== Los Angeles World Affairs Council ===
In 2012, McCarthy was appointed president and CEO of the Los Angeles World Affairs Council, a foreign affairs forum. He interviewed speakers including Timothy Geithner, Elon Musk, Stanley McChrystal, John McCain and Bill Clinton. He produced two conferences on The Future of Asia in 2016 and 2017 and a conference on the Future of the Automobile in 2018.

=== American Academy in Berlin ===
From September 2018 to April 2019, McCarthy was the president of the American Academy in Berlin, which was established in 1994 by Ambassador Richard C. Holbrooke and other distinguished Germans and Americans to foster greater understanding and dialogue between the United States and Germany. McCarthy interviewed German President Frank-Walter Steinmeier, Russian writer Masha Gessen, US Ambassador and former N Korean envoy Christopher R. Hill and President of the Metropolitan Museum of New York, Daniel H. Weiss.

== Awards and recognition ==
- Four Emmy Awards: ABC News/Time Magazine 2004 (Iraq), ABC News 2005 (Iraq), ABC News 2008 (Iraq), CBS News 2011 (Afghanistan),
- Edward R. Murrow Award for coverage of Marine Corps battalion in Afghanistan in 2010, CBS News
- Human Rights Press Award, "Taking on the System," Oct. 9, 2000, Time Asia feature on women's rights
- Honorary Degree as a Doctor of Literature from University College Dublin

== Public events ==
McCarthy is a frequent speaker and moderator for programs that focus on the media and foreign coverage, American foreign policy, events in the Middle East, and the rise of China. He also provides commentary and expert opinions for publications including The New York Times and Yale Global Online. McCarthy presented a TEDx talk titled The Cost of War in 2014.
