= WLNG =

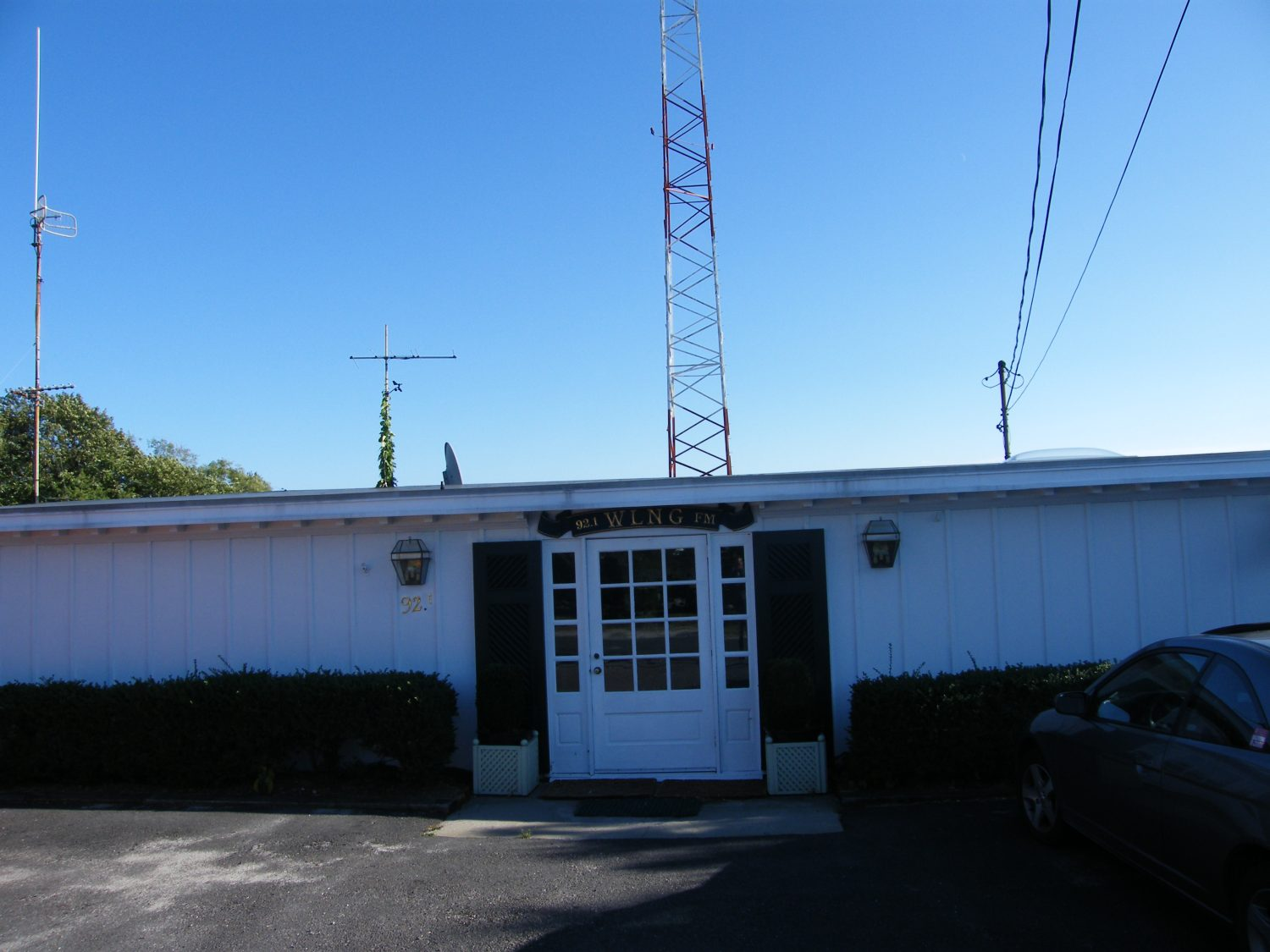
- WLNG studios
- Sag Harbor, New York; United States
- Broadcast area: Eastern Long Island; Southeastern Connecticut
- Frequency: 92.1 MHz
- Branding: WLNG 92.1 FM

Programming
- Format: adult hits; oldies
- Affiliations: ABC News Now; ABC News Radio; Fox News Radio; NBC News Radio

Ownership
- Owner: Bark Out Loud Dogs Media, LLC

History
- First air date: April 13, 1969
- Former call signs: WLNG-FM (1968–2000)
- Call sign meaning: Long Island

Technical information
- Licensing authority: FCC
- Facility ID: 39640
- Class: A
- ERP: 5,300 watts
- HAAT: 106 meters (348 ft)
- Transmitter coordinates: 40°58′19.3″N 72°20′52.2″W

Links
- Public license information: Public file; LMS
- Webcast: Listen live
- Website: www.wlng.com

WLNG (92.1 FM) is an oldies/adult hits radio station licensed to Sag Harbor, New York, and serving eastern Long Island. WLNG is owned and operated by Bark Out Loud Dogs Media, LLC, a company led by meteorologist Bill Evans and his wife Sandra Foschi.

== Programming and history ==
WLNG has only had three ownership changes since its founding in 1963.

Fitzgerald C. Smith (1922–2005) started the station on August 13, 1963. Fitzgerald (known as Jerry) had been a reporter for The New York Times and NBC radio. WLNG began broadcasting on AM at 1600 kHz. In 1996 the 1600 frequency was sold to WWRL so that they could increase the power of their station which was on the same frequency closer to New York City. WLNG has been broadcasting on FM since 1969. Its FM transmitter is located on a hill in Noyack, New York, which disc jockeys call "Mount Sidney" after longtime station president Paul Sidney (1940–2009). The station's call letters come from Long Island. It transmitted in monaural until January 20, 2011, a rarity on the FM band which is mostly stereo.

The station was sold to Robert King in 1969. King was owner of Montauk Caribbean Airlines (later Long Island Airways) which offered commuter air service between East Hampton and New York City. The station was operated by a trust after his death in 2014.

WLNG has earned a reputation as a throwback to an earlier era with its frequent use of jingles, reverb, frequent remote broadcasts at local events, and personality disc jockeys. In 1998, on the occasion of the station's 35th anniversary on the air, and president Paul Sidney's 34th year there, he stated "The key to staying around for 35 years is pretty simple: Be local, in news, sound and music."

The station's target market is the Hamptons and eastern Long Island, though the station has been noted as being heard "from Mastic to Montauk; the signal even reaches parts of Rhode Island and Connecticut". According to Sidney and local business people, the station built good relationships with local establishments; as of 2004, the station was producing 250 remote broadcasts per year from community locales, events and businesses.

The station is noted for its use of numerous jingles (many from the original PAMS jingle library), which are often aired back-to-back. Paul Sidney, who was with the station beginning in 1964, started the jingle practice. As the use of jingles declined in the 1970s, Sidney "became obsessed with them" and collected over 2,000. As he put it in a New Yorker magazine "Talk of the Town" article in 2002, "We're the only station that when we say 'Here comes fourteen in a row' we're not talking about records."

WLNG was one of the first radio stations in the country to focus on playing oldies, and identified itself as "The Oldies Station" beginning in the early 1960s despite a consultant's warning. While the station included current hits in rotation for decades and even as recently as 1999, today its playlist is almost all oldies.

As of 1988, WLNG competed with 22 other stations in its market. In 2005, Edison Research wrote about WLNG's standing in the area:

"...one of the oddest success stories of recent months: WLNG Eastern Long Island, N.Y., whose broad playlist, retro jingles, and endless remotes have made it a radio junkie's favorite for years. Then the market got its first ratings, and suddenly WLNG was No. 3 12-plus – an individually owned station hanging in when the groups were pulling out, or at least getting nervous."

In 1995, the station began leasing transmission tower space to Connecticut-based classical and NPR-affiliate WSHU-FM, during a period of increasing competition for listeners in specific demographics. At the time, the station was described by a competitor (WEHM), as probably generating "the most sales in the region", and Sidney stated that "banks regarded WLNG as the most successful station on the East End".

On May 29, 2015, longtime WLNG air personality Rusty Potz ended his run on the "Potz On The Program". Potz, who had been in radio for 52 years, retired to Sarasota, Florida, with his wife, Margaret, although he continues to work part-time selling advertising for the station.

At the start of 2019, with Evans and Foschi taking over the station half a month prior, the station's format was refined with its focus continuing on local programming.

== News and sports ==
WLNG's local news coverage, according to the station's vice president in 2007, is considered the best by many locals and is famous for being the definitive source "with close to a 90% share" for weather information during major storms. On July 17, 1996, the station was broadcasting a live remote from Jamesport, New York when TWA Flight 800 crashed into the nearby Atlantic Ocean, and states that it was the first to break news of the event.

In 2007, the station became affiliated with ESPN 1050, for local broadcasts of ESPN sports radio, however it was not without some coverage difficulties, according to Newsday.

Before the 2011 Hurricane Irene, WLNG was listed as the "reliable resource for the latest on the hurricane's progress" by Rep. Tim Bishop, (D-New York), and was the designated broadcast information source.

During Hurricane Sandy in 2012, WLNG continued broadcasting and streaming online on generator power, using flashlights, as the storm surge rose to "ankle deep" in the studio. When a "burning" smell was detected, the station finally went off air from 8 pm. Monday until 3 a.m Tuesday when the water subsided. After the storm, WLNG helped coordinate relief supplies and vehicles with local police.

== Specials ==
The station has allowed guest hosts on air, if their airtime was sponsored. In 1987, a pair of (sponsored) 5th grade students broadcast for three hours, during which "all did not go well", catching the attention of New York Times "Long Island Journal Desk" columnist Diane Ketchum.

== Recognition ==
- In 1993, WLNG won a National Association of Broadcasters Crystal Radio Award "for excellence in community service".
- In 2007, Paul Sidney was inducted into the New York State Broadcasters Association Hall of Fame.
- On the March 20, 2014, and January 6, 2016, episodes of The Tonight Show Starring Jimmy Fallon, Billy Joel and Jimmy Fallon discuss a plot they have to "crash" the WLNG studio in Sag Harbor. They claim the plan was devised during a party at Howard Stern's house of which they both attended
