= Bob Clark (television reporter) =

American television journalist

Bob Clark (May 1922 – December 9, 2015) was an American television journalist. Born in Omaha, Nebraska, he received a B.S. and M.A. while studying journalism and politics. Clark was a television reporter and White House Correspondent for ABC News from the 1960s until the 1970s. He is most remembered for reporting the assassinations of John F. Kennedy in 1963 and Robert F. Kennedy in 1968. Clark was riding in a press car in President Kennedy’s Dallas motorcade in 1963. He witnessed RFK’s 1968 murder at the Ambassador Hotel in Los Angeles. Clark was the only person to see both Kennedy brothers after each was shot in Dallas, Texas, and Los Angeles, California, respectively.

He was also a contributing host to the ABC Sunday interview program, then entitled Issues and Answers, now known as This Week. Later in his life, around the 1990s, Clark was a guest commentator on C-SPAN.

He died on December 9, 2015, at the age of 93.
