= Issues and Answers =

US weekly TV news program

- Presented by: Howard K. Smith; Bob Clark
- Opening theme: Second Suite in F for Military Band, Movement III: "Song of the Blacksmith" (Op. 28, No. 2)
- Composer: Gustav Holst
- Country of origin: United States
- Original language: English

Production
- Producer: Peggy Whedon
- Running time: appx. 30 minutes

Original release
- Network: ABC
- Release: November 27, 1960 – November 8, 1981

Related
- This Week (successor)

Issues and Answers was a weekly Sunday morning talk show telecast by the American Broadcasting Company from November 27, 1960 to November 8, 1981. At the time, Sunday morning talk shows as they are now carried actually aired in mid-afternoons on Sundays before sports divisions had taken over the time slot in full, and the network distributed the show either live airing or for later broadcast to its affiliates (though interviews were often recorded in the later part of the previous week on Thursdays or Fridays).

Issues and Answers was ABC's counterpart to NBC's Meet the Press and CBS's Face the Nation. It featured TV reporters interviewing selected newsmakers of the contemporary time period – mainly domestic and foreign government officials and other insiders. Unlike the other networks' news-interview TV programs, which featured newspaper and radio reporters along with TV correspondents, Issues and Answers more commonly featured only personnel from ABC News.

For its entire run it was produced by Margaret "Peggy" Whedon, one of ABC's first female correspondents.

Issues and Answers aired its last edition on November 8, 1981, and replaced on November 15 by the re-formatted and hour-long This Week with David Brinkley, which remains on the air as of 2025, and now features George Stephanopoulos as moderator.
