= Bill Evans (meteorologist) =

American journalist

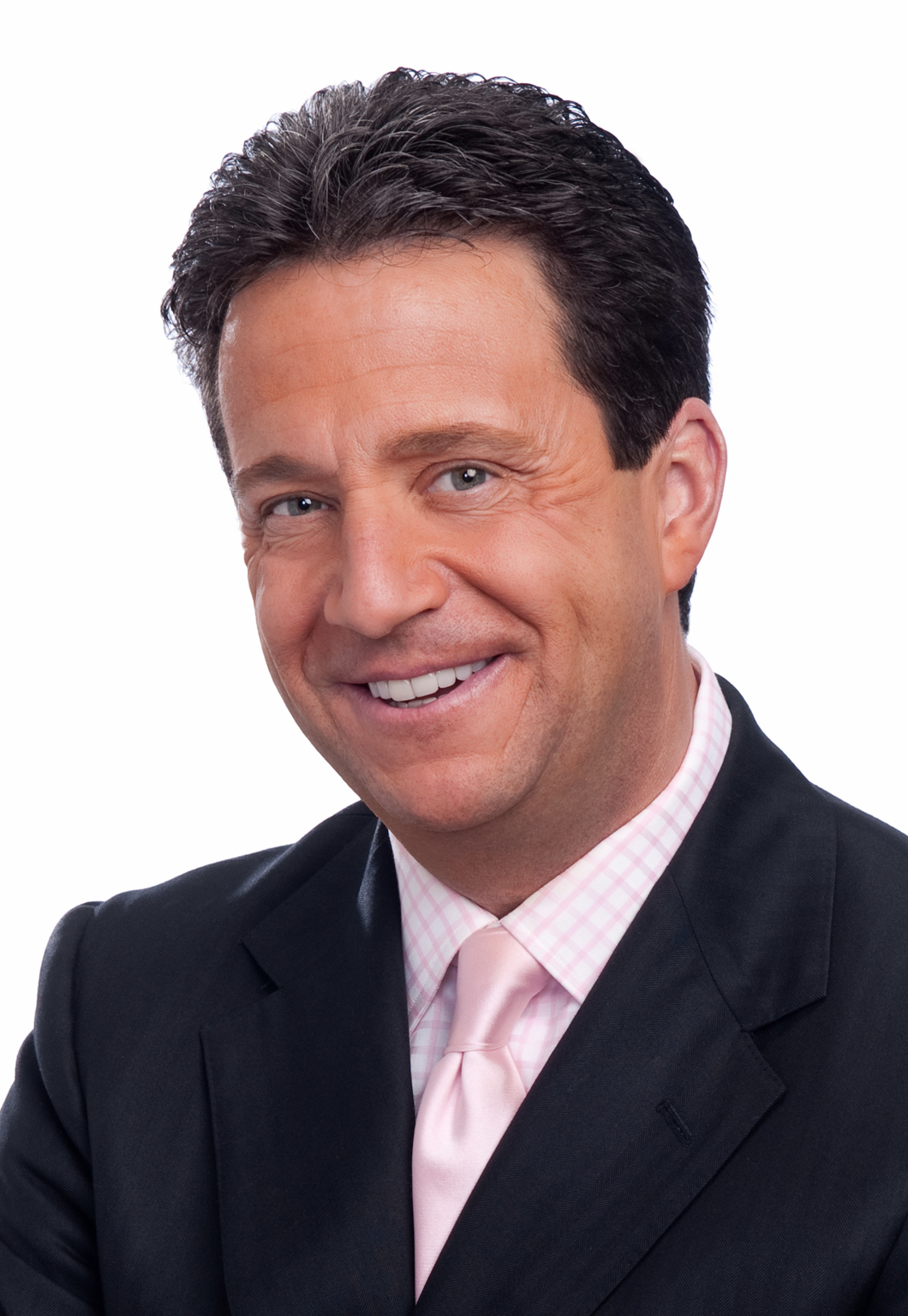
- Born: William Howard Evans; 16 July 1960 (age 65); Meridian, Mississippi
- Occupation: Meteorologist

William Howard Evans (born 16 July 1960) is an American meteorologist and the former weatherman for WABC-TV, the ABC affiliate in New York City.

== Early career ==
Evans's broadcasting career began at the age of 13 in his hometown of Meridian, Mississippi on WDAL Radio and WTOK-TV. He attended Mississippi State University, where he studied business administration, and Jackson State University, where he studied meteorology.

In 1985 the National Weather Service named him "Outstanding Meteorologist" for his forecasting and reporting during Hurricane Elena.

Before coming to New York, Evans was meteorologist for WALA-TV in Mobile, Alabama and was morning show host on WABB-FM. He also held similar jobs in Dallas, as both meteorologist at WFAA-TV and morning show host for KHYI-FM.

== WABC-TV ==
Evans was the Senior Meteorologist for Eyewitness News This Morning and Eyewitness News at Noon. He is now on WLNG Radio.

Evans is a 15-time Emmy award winner for "Outstanding On-Camera Achievement in Weather Broadcasting." He had been with WABC-TV from 13 December 1989 until 5 February 2019.

In 2016 Evans was awarded the prestigious Ellis Island Medal of Honor.

For years he played himself in The Christmas Spectacular at Radio City Music Hall. Evans has also played Lumiere (the candlestick) on Broadway in Disney's Beauty and the Beast. He has appeared on ABC's Good Morning America. He also appeared on ESPN Sports Center and The Michael Kay Show on ESPN NY Radio 98.7 FM. Evans has appeared on the show "How Stuff Works" on the Discovery Channel and Live with Kelly and Ryan.

== Other broadcasting ==
Evans also reported the weather for 95.5, WPLJ-FM and sister stations NASH FM 94.7 and 77WABC in New York City.

On 14 December 2018, Evans and his wife Sandra Foschi purchased WLNG in Sag Harbor, New York.

== Charitable interests ==
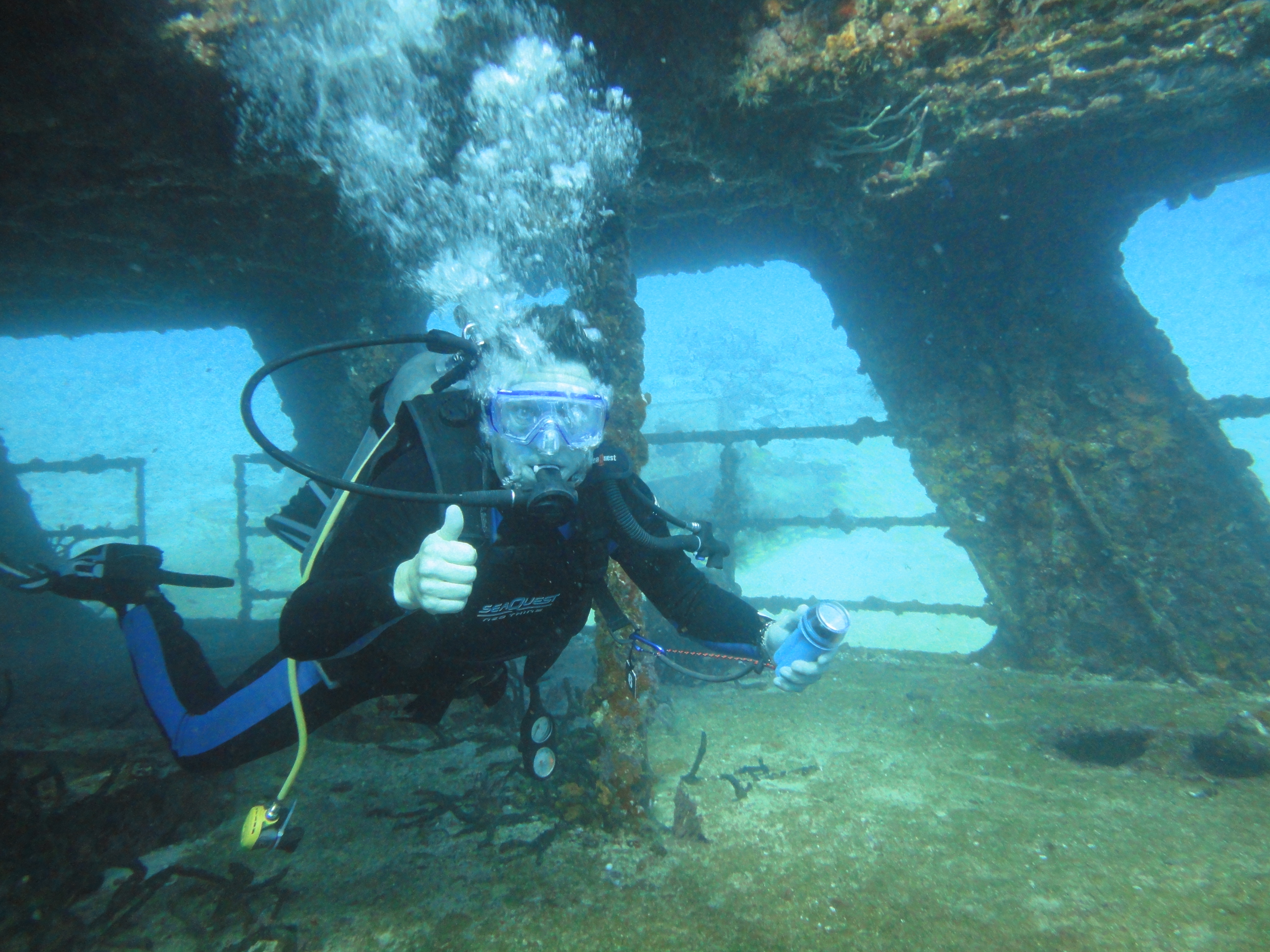
Bill Evans scuba diving

Evans helps raise funds for children's charities Babies Hospital at Columbia Presbyterian, the Juvenile Diabetes Association, Junior Achievement, and the National Young Adult Institute. He also hosts golf tournaments to raise funds for The Red Cross of New Jersey and Special Olympics of New York.

== Writing ==
Evans' first novel Category 7: The Biggest Storm in History, was co-written by Marianna Jameson. Evans promoted the work on a 2007 book tour. The story is about "weather folk" tracking a hurricane as it approaches New York City.

Evans has gone on to release more novels in the "eco-thriller" genre, including "Frozen Fire", a sequel to "Category 7", "Dry Ice", and "Blackmail Earth". Evans also penned a weather book for kids entitled: "It's Raining Fish & Spiders".

=== Bibliography ===
- Evans, Bill; Jameson, Marianna (10 July 2007). Category 7: The Biggest Storm in History. Forge Books. ISBN 978-0-7653-1735-3.
- Evans, Bill; Jameson, Marianna (23 June 2009). Frozen Fire. Forge Books. ISBN 978-0-7653-2008-7.
- Evans, Bill; Jameson, Marianna (16 August 2011). Dry Ice. Tor Books. ISBN 978-0-7653-2472-6.
- Evans, Bill (22 May 2012). It's Raining Fish and Spiders. Forge Books. ISBN 978-0-7653-2132-9.
- Evans, Bill (19 June 2012). Blackmail Earth. Tor Books. ISBN 978-0-7653-2783-3.
