= Jackie Judd =

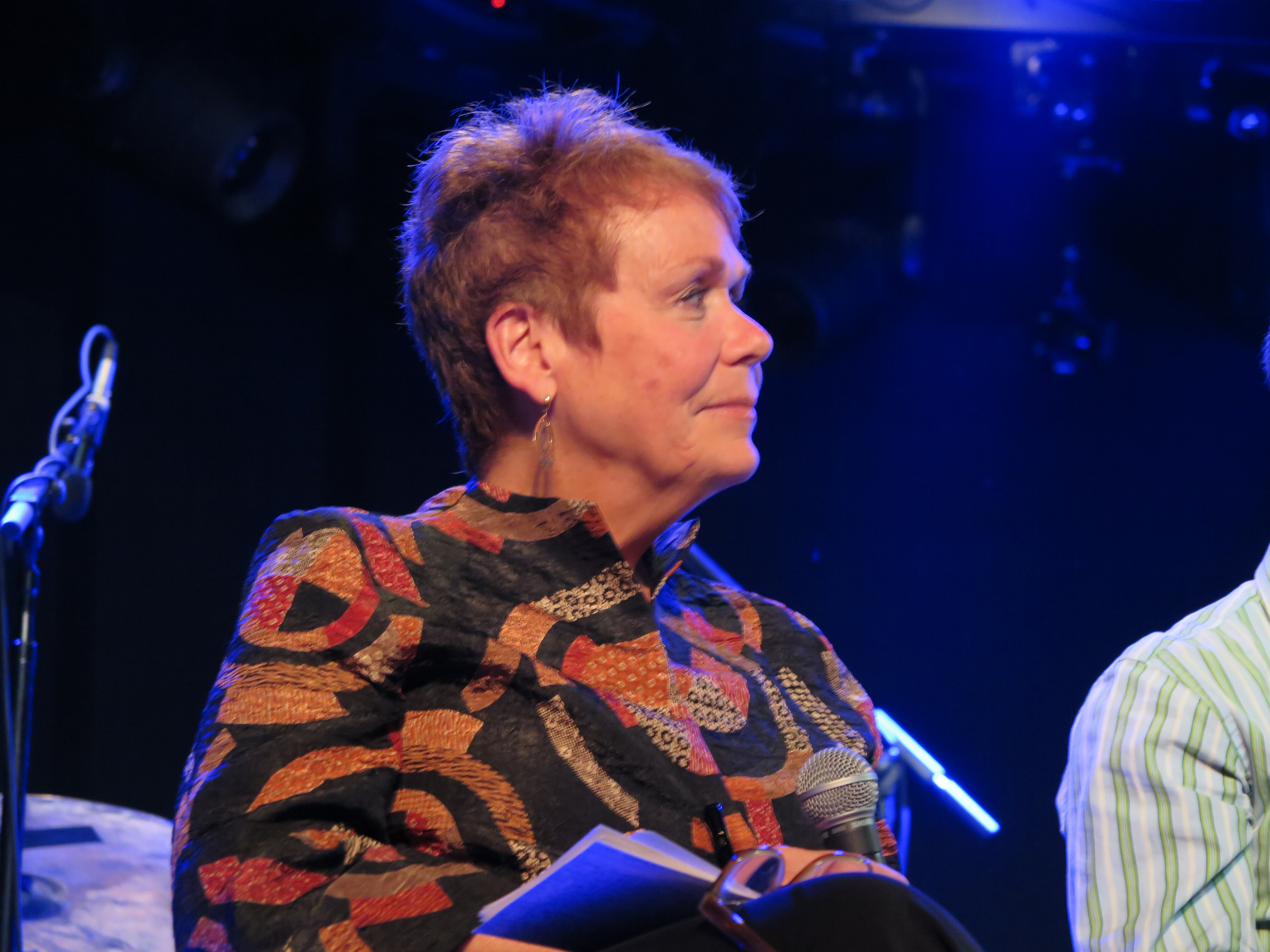

Personal details
- Profession: medical journalism

Jackie Judd is a health media journalist.

== Life ==
Judd attended Woodlawn High School in Baltimore County, Maryland and received a bachelor of arts degree from American University in 1974. She began her career in radio, eventually working for National Public Radio and CBS News Radio before becoming a television journalist.

From 1987 to 2003 Judd worked in the Washington bureau of ABC News. She left on-camera journalism to join the staff of the Kaiser Family Foundation in 2003.
