= Aaron Katersky =

American journalist

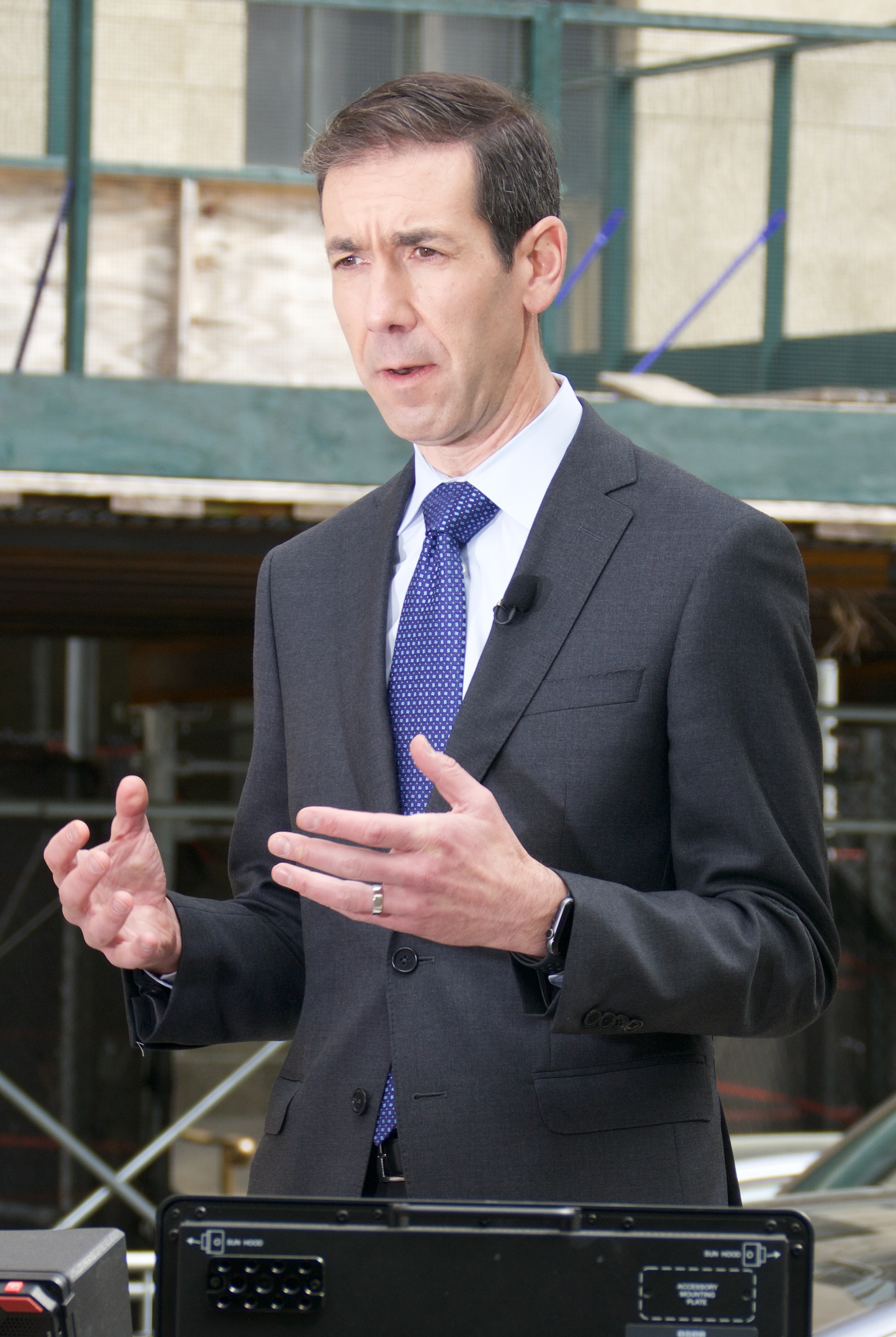
- Aaron Katersky in 2024, reporting outside the Prosecution of Donald Trump in New York
- Born: June 12, 1975 (age 51)
- Education: Syracuse University
- Occupation: Broadcast journalist
- Title: Correspondent, ABC News Radio

Aaron Katersky is a Senior Investigative Reporter for ABC News based in New York City. He covered the Iraq War, the death of Pope John Paul II, and the Arab Spring as a correspondent for ABC News Radio.

Katersky also reports on military affairs from posts around the country, on Wall Street from the New York Stock Exchange, on terrorism from the federal courts and on world affairs from the United Nations. He is ABC News Radio's special events anchor, leading live coverage of Michael Jackson's death, the 2008 presidential election and the wedding of Prince William and Catherine Middleton in London.

Prior to working at ABC News, Katersky worked at radio stations in Houston, Syracuse, New York, Hartford, Connecticut and Southeastern Massachusetts.

In December 2024, Katersky appeared in the Luigi Mangione documentary Manhunt: Luigi Mangione and the CEO Murder - A Special Edition of 20/20.

Katersky is a graduate of Syracuse University with dual degrees in broadcast journalism and religion. Originally from Scituate, Massachusetts, he now lives in New York City with his wife, Marcy.
