= David Wright (journalist) =

American journalist

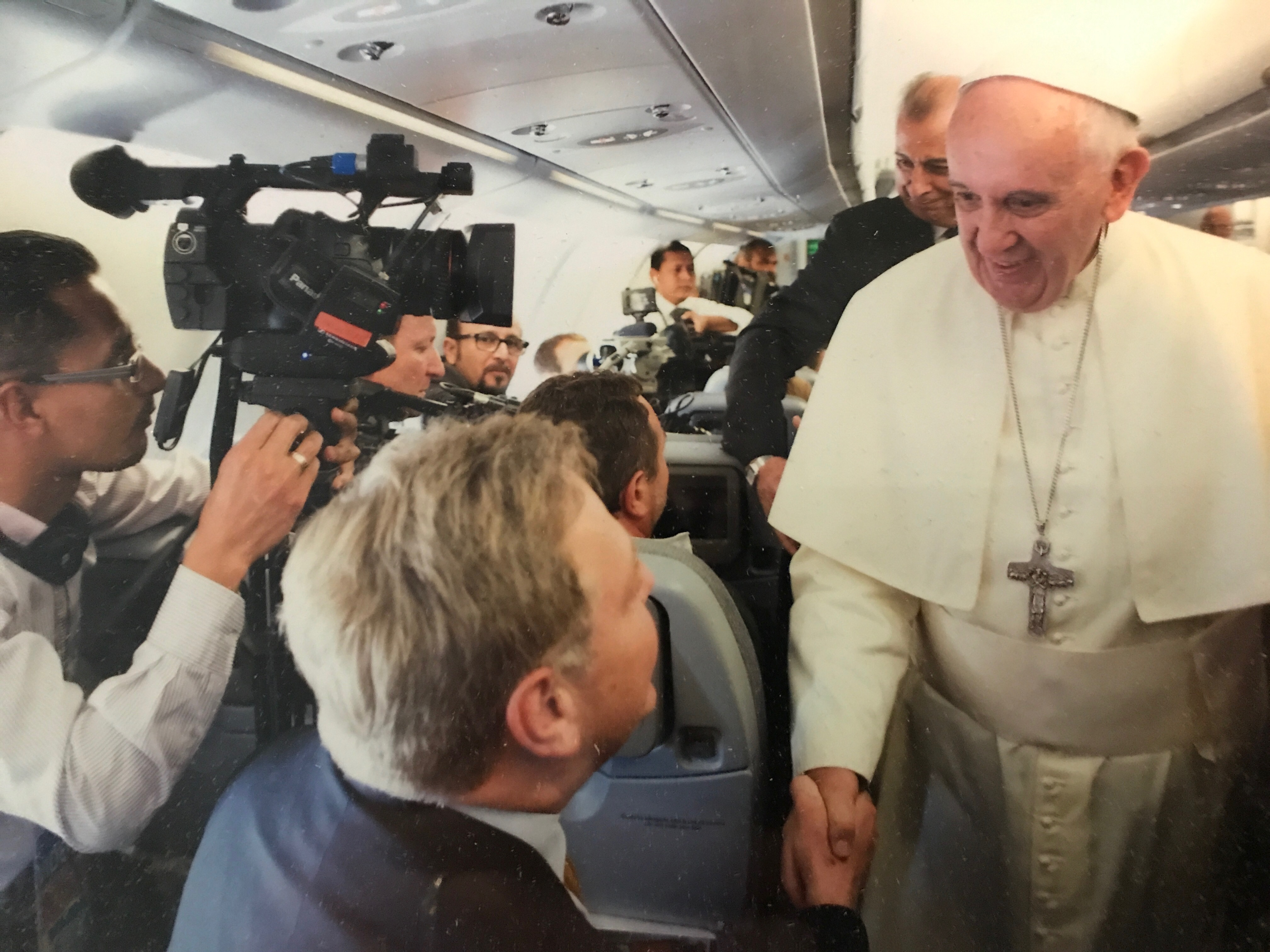
- Wright interviewing Pope Francis
- Born: Buffalo, New York, U.S.
- Education: Harvard University (BA); Merton College, Oxford (MA)
- Occupation: Journalist
- Employer: ABC News
- Spouse: Victoria Brannigan (m. 2005)
- Children: 3

David Wright is a Canadian-American broadcast journalist best known for his work as a correspondent for ABC News. His work has appeared on Nightline, World News Tonight, Good Morning America and 20/20.

== Early life and education ==
Wright was born in Buffalo, New York. His father, Dr. John Wright, is a former professor and dean at the University at Buffalo School of Medicine. His mother, Deanna Wright, is deceased. Wright graduated from Williamsville East High School. He earned his bachelor's degree magna cum laude from Harvard University and a master's degree from Merton College, Oxford.

== Career ==
Wright began his career in public radio as a reporter at WBFO-FM Buffalo, WBUR-FM Boston, and KQED-FM San Francisco, where he hosted the award-winning statewide broadcast The California Report and was also a frequent contributor to NPR nationally. His first job in TV news was as a reporter at KRON-TV, then the NBC affiliate in the San Francisco Bay Area.

Wright has filled in as host of "The Madeleine Brand Show" on Southern California Public Radio, On Point on NPR, and the weekend edition of All Things Considered.

As a correspondent for ABC News, Wright has reported from six continents, interviewed six U.S. presidents, and covered two papal transitions. He joined ABC News in November 2000 and has been posted to bureaus in London, Washington, D.C., Los Angeles, and New York City.

As a foreign correspondent, Wright has reported from conflict zones, including Gaza, Lebanon, Iraq, Afghanistan, Congo and Sudan His work in Afghanistan in the immediate aftermath of the September 11 attacks shared a Peabody Award as part of ABC's overall coverage of 9/11. He has made more than a dozen trips to Iraq, starting with the UN weapons inspections in 2002 before the US invasion, and his stories from Baghdad and Fallujah in 2003 shared a News & Documentary Emmy Award His reporting from the Darfur region of Sudan won an Emmy and the David Kaplan Award from the Overseas Press Club.

Wright has covered the Holy See and the Catholic Church for ABC News since the final years of Pope John Paul II. He reported from Rome during Pope John Paul's final days and the conclave that followed, part of the ABC News team that shared a 2006 Alfred I. duPont–Columbia University Award. When Pope Benedict XVI resigned in 2013, he covered the conclave that ended with the election of Pope Francis. Wright has traveled on multiple trips with Popes Benedict and Francis in Europe, the Middle East, Africa, and the Americas. He covered Pope Francis' historic trip to Ireland, as he sought to atone for the clerical sexual abuse crisis. He also covered the testimony of Archbishop Carlo Maria Viganò that led to calls for Pope Francis to resign. Wright conducted the only national TV interview with the embattled Bishop of Buffalo, his hometown, over his mishandling of sexual abuse claims. The Catholic Herald reported the Nightline interview "piqued Rome's interest" and was likely a factor in Malone's eventual ouster.

In 2008, he covered then Senator Barack Obama's historic bid for the Democratic nomination. During the general election that year, was assigned to cover Republican John McCain.

Wright was Nightline's lead political reporter during the 2016 United States presidential election from the New Hampshire primaries to the Presidential transition of Donald Trump. He led ABC's weekend coverage of the Trump Administration for most of his term in office.

Wright's Nightline reports on sexual assault allegations against yoga guru Bikram Choudhury were nominated for a 2015 Emmy Award.

Wright has also reported on wildlife and conservation efforts around the world. He has traveled to see Giant Pandas in China, Spirit bears in British Columbia, polar bears in Hudson's Bay, and mountain gorillas in Congo.

=== Suspension and removal from political coverage ===
On February 26, 2020, ABC News suspended Wright, who was video taped without his knowledge in a bar by Project Veritas complaining about the network's coverage. In the hidden camera video, Wright allegedly said of Trump: "We don’t hold him to account. We also don’t give him credit for what things he does do." He also self-identified as a socialist and complained about the fluffy content on ABC, giving as an example Walt Disney characters on Good Morning America. ABC is a division of The Walt Disney Company. The video was described as choppy and Project Veritas has a history of deceptively editing videos.

A February 26 statement by ABC News said, in part, "Any action that damages our reputation for fairness and impartiality or gives the appearance of compromising it harms ABC News and the individuals involved." It added that Wright would be reassigned from political reporting after serving his suspension "to avoid any possible appearance of bias." On a shareholder call, Disney CEO Bob Chapek elaborated: "He (Wright) said some things that made us question his objectivity and obviously when you're reporting the news, there's no place for someone who's got a heavily subjective opinion. So internally we dealt with that situation."

ABC/Disney's capitulation to Project Veritas brought a strong rebuke from respected journalists. Erik Wemple of the Washington Post wrote: "If ABC News has any concerns about Wright’s alleged bias — even the appearance of such — then it should present the evidence." Former Nightline anchor Ted Koppel and former Nightline Executive Producer Tom Bettag called Wright one of the network's finest correspondents, adding: "Here’s the bottom line: Mr. Wright deserves to be judged on the accuracy and objectivity of what he delivers to ABC News and puts on the air. Based on our collective experience of more than 100 years in broadcast journalism, Mr. Wright is a reporter who provides an unbiased product. He’s an excellent writer, too!"

== Personal life ==
Wright met his wife, former Sky News producer Victoria Brannigan, in Rome when they were both covering the funeral of Pope John Paul II. They were married in a Roman Catholic ceremony at the Basilica of Santa Maria in Trastevere in 2005. They have three daughters and live in New York.
