= Nancy Cordes =

American journalist (born 1974)

- Born: Nancy Weiner; August 10, 1974 (age 52); Los Angeles, California, U.S.
- Other name: Nancy Weiner
- Education: University of Pennsylvania (BA); Princeton University (MPP)
- Occupation: Journalist
- Spouse: Harald Cordes
- Children: 2

Nancy Cordes (born August 10, 1974; née Weiner) is the CBS News chief White House correspondent, based in Washington, D.C. She is a regular contributor to all CBS News programs and platforms.

== Early life ==
Born Nancy Weiner in Los Angeles, Cordes grew up in Hawaii on the islands of Kauai and Oahu. Her mother, Linda Weiner, is a pediatrician. Her father, Robert Weiner, is a general surgeon and former medical director at Kauai Hospice. She graduated from the Punahou School in Hawaii. In 1995, she graduated magna cum laude from the University of Pennsylvania where she was a member of Phi Beta Kappa. Cordes received a master's degree in public policy at Princeton University's Woodrow Wilson School of Public and International Affairs.

== Career ==
(from CBS News On-Line) Nancy Cordes is CBS News' chief White House correspondent based in Washington, D.C. She was previously CBS News chief Congressional correspondent. Cordes led coverage from Capitol Hill as rioters stormed the U.S. Capitol in January 2021 and as Donald Trump became the first American president in history to be impeached twice. During her 12 years covering Congress, she reported extensively on government shutdowns, COVID-19 relief legislation negotiations, five Supreme Court confirmations, the congressional investigation into Russian election interference, the 2017 tax cut bill, the battle over President Obama's health care law, the rise of the Tea Party, and ongoing debates over immigration reform, gun control and many other policy issues.

Cordes has been a major contributor to CBS News' election coverage since 2008. On Election Night 2020, Cordes was part of the in-studio anchor team and led coverage of House and Senate races. In 2016 she was the lead CBS News correspondent covering Hillary Clinton's presidential bid and co-hosted a primary debate in Iowa. She covered President Obama's bid for re-election in 2012.

Cordes joined CBS News in 2007 as transportation and consumer safety correspondent. Previously, Cordes was an ABC News correspondent based in New York (2005–07), where she reported for all ABC News broadcasts and covered major news stories including Hurricane Katrina, the war in Iraq and the 2004 election. Before that, she was a Washington-based correspondent for NewsOne, the affiliate news service of ABC News (2003–04). Prior to ABC News, Cordes was a reporter for WJLA-TV Washington, D.C. (1999-2003). While at WJLA-TV, Cordes covered the Sept. 11, 2001, attack on the Pentagon, the 2000 presidential race, the Washington, D.C.-area sniper attacks and peacekeeping efforts in Bosnia. She began her career as a reporter for KHNL-TV in Honolulu (1995–97).

== Personal life ==
Cordes married Harald Cordes in 2006.
