= Michelle Franzen =

American journalist

- Born: Michelle Renee Franzen; 30 August 1968 (age 58); Gifford, Illinois, U.S.
- Other names: Michelle Franzen Buettner, Michelle Buettner
- Education: California Polytechnic State University
- Occupation: ABC News Radio anchor
- Children: 1

Michelle Renee Franzen (born August 30, 1968) is a New York-based midday anchor for ABC News Radio. From 2001 to 2013 she was a national correspondent for NBC News. She has reported on a wide range of issues and events for various television stations, as well as MSNBC, The Today Show, and NBC Nightly News. Franzen has a journalism degree from California Polytechnic State University in San Luis Obispo, California.

Franzen started her career at Santa Barbara's KEYT station and worked as a producer, anchor, and reporter. In 1995, she joined KFTY in Santa Rosa, California as a general assignment reporter. In 1996, Franzen began working as a fill-in weekend anchor and general assignment reporter for KTXL in Sacramento, California. After leaving KTXL, Franzen became a reporter for KRON in San Francisco.

Franzen is a member of the advisory board for the journalism department of California Polytechnic State University.
