= David Ensor (journalist) =

American television and radio journalist

- Ensor in 2026 at Politics and Prose
- Born: David Burnham Ensor
- Education: University of California, Berkeley; Phillips Academy Andover
- Occupations: Television and radio journalist
- Relatives: Robert Ensor (grandfather)

David Burnham Ensor is an American television and radio journalist. As a communications executive, he has experience in government, business and the non-profit sector.

Ensor was the founding Director of the George Washington University Project for Media and National Security, a non-profit group bringing reporters, military leaders and national security leaders together for face-to-face conversations, in support of fact-based journalism. The Project includes the Defense Writers Group, a forty-year Washington, D.C. institution.

He was an Executive Vice President of the Atlantic Council, a Washington, D.C. think tank on international issues 2016–2017. In the Fall Term of 2015, he was a Fellow at the Shorenstein Center, at Harvard University's Kennedy School of Government.

Ensor served as the 28th director of the Voice of America, 2011–2015. During his four years leading VOA, its audience increased almost 40 percent. He co-founded a daily Russian-language television show Current Time responding to the Russian invasion of Crimea, developed a partnership with the BBC fighting Ebola in Africa; and helped defend VOA against political attempts to weaken its journalistic independence. He helped VOA reach more than 187 million globally per week in 45 languages, on television, radio, internet, social media.

In 2010–2011, he served as Director for Communications and Public Diplomacy of the U.S. Embassy in Kabul, Afghanistan. He led American efforts to help Afghans build a modern mobile telephone, social media, radio and television infrastructure, and a broad range of press and cultural activities designed to help Afghanistan recover from 30 years of war. He was one of the highest ranking representatives of President Obama's "civilian surge" to serve in Afghanistan.

From 2006 to 2009, Ensor was the spokesman and Executive Vice President for Communications at Mercuria Energy Group. Prior to joining Mercuria Energy Group he worked for 31 years as a journalist for National Public Radio, ABC News, and CNN.

== Education ==
Ensor earned a bachelor's degree with honors in European history from the University of California, Berkeley. He graduated from Phillips Academy Andover in 1969.

== Career as a journalist ==
Ensor has worked as a television and radio journalist for more than 30 years. From 1975 to 1980, Ensor was a reporter in Washington, D.C. for National Public Radio. He joined ABC News as White House correspondent in 1980, reporting on the presidency of Jimmy Carter. During his career at ABC News Ensor also served as a diplomatic correspondent for ABC News based at the U.S. State Department, and reported from Warsaw, Rome and Moscow. In August 1999, Ensor joined CNN, where he worked as national security correspondent based in Washington, D.C, reporting on the U.S. intelligence community and on national security issues such as international terrorism, the proliferation of weapons of mass destruction and the national missile defense debate. For his 2004 CNN documentary, Warsaw Rising, on the 1944 Polish uprising against the Nazis, he received an Emmy nomination, a National Headliner Award and the Knight's Cross of the Order of Merit, from the President of Poland. He left CNN in 2006.

== Organizations ==
Ensor is a member of the Council on Foreign Relations.

== Personal life ==
Ensor is the son of Mideast oil expert Andrew F. Ensor and grandson of the historian Sir Robert Ensor, one of the founders of the Fabian Society and of the Labour Party (UK).

== Publications ==
- "In Volatile Europe Danger and Opportunity Abound", with Fred Kempe, Handelsblatt.com, June 2, 2016
- "How Washington Can Win the Information War", Foreign Policy, December 14, 2015
- "No, Governor Kasich, Voice of America's Not About 'Judeo-Christian Values'", Politico, November 2015
- "Exporting the First Amendment" Shorenstein Center paper, Kennedy School of Government, Harvard University, December 14, 2015
- "Poland Is Moving to Shut Off Independent News. What Will Biden Do?", Politico, August 26, 2021
