= CeFaan Kim =

American television journalist

CeFaan Kim is an American journalist of Korean descent. He is currently an ABC News correspondent and reporter for WABC-TV in New York City. Previously, he worked as a reporter for News 12 Westchester/Hudson Valley and as the Queens Reporter for NY1 News, and a political producer for NY1 News.

== Personal life ==
CeFaan Kim was born and raised in Philadelphia, Pennsylvania. He graduated from New York University in 2003 with a bachelor's degree in broadcast journalism. He is a U.S. Army Reserve veteran. He graduated the non-commissioned officer’s academy on the Commandant’s List.

== Career ==
Kim started his career in 2003 as a field producer for NY1 News in New York City. While there, he covered several major political events, including the 2008 presidential campaigns of Hillary Clinton, Rudy Giuliani and Barack Obama. Kim later joined News 12 Westchester/Hudson Valley in 2012, where he worked as a reporter. He most notably covered the deadly Metro-North crash in 2015.

In September 2015, Kim joined Eyewitness News. In addition to breaking news coverage, he also reported extensively on poverty in the Asian American community in New York. In December 2016, Kim reported exclusively on Asian American seniors who ride casino buses to make ends meet.

During the pandemic shutdown, he reported nightly from the streets of New York City, speaking with health care workers, gravediggers, farmers and others impacted by the health crisis.

Throughout the COVID-19 pandemic CeFaan reported at the forefront covering the rise of anti-Asian crimes and racism that emerged as a consequence., interviewing and telling the stories of countless victims. His reporting helped spark a national conversation on anti-Asian hate and changed how the NYPD investigates anti-Asian hate crimes.

CeFaan also reported daily on the Black Lives Matter protests that followed the murder of George Floyd. He covered the 2020 presidential election recount in Pennsylvania, the Chelsea terrorist bombing and protests of President Trump's travel ban at JFK airport.

In May 2021, ABC News announced that CeFaan Kim would be joining as a correspondent, splitting his time between the legacy news organization and WABC-TV.

He is the former co-chair of the Asian American Journalists Association's Media Watch Committee and serves as an AAJA mentor.

== Awards ==
He is the recipient of a National Edward R. Murrow Award for his coverage during the coronavirus pandemic, a regional Edward R. Murrow Award for his anti-Asian hate coverage, a regional Edward R. Murrow Award for his part in team coverage when New York City Mayor Eric Adams was indicted on federal charges, and five Emmy awards including for his coverage during the BLM protests.

Kim was honored by Gold House in May 2021. Kim was among 100 API leaders who were recognized for their impact in advocacy, journalism and other categories.
