= Bill Greenwood (cricketer) =

English cricketer

Henry William Greenwood (4 September 1909 – 24 March 1979) was an English cricketer who played for Sussex and Northamptonshire between 1933 and 1949. He was born in East Preston, West Sussex, and died in Bromley. He appeared in 79 first-class matches as a right-handed batsman and wicketkeeper. He scored 2,590 runs with a highest score of 115 and claimed 68 wickets including fourteen stumpings.
