= Los Angeles World Affairs Council =

American non-profit, non-partisan organization

The Los Angeles World Affairs Council & Town Hall (LAWACTH), the Los Angeles office within the national network of World Affairs Councils of America, is a non-profit, non-partisan organization which arranges speaker events, debates, seminars, and film screenings with international themes. It is a membership-based organization supported by membership fees and contributions. Speakers have included heads of state, political leaders, and entrepreneurs in technology and science. A subset within the LAWAC is the Young Professionals program, which engages young people in the workforce in global affairs issues and networking.

== History ==
LAWAC was founded in 1954. Since that time, the Council has hosted eight US presidents and more than 250 heads of state and government. Most Los Angeles World Affairs Council events feature major international political figures in either speech or interview formats. Events are generally on weekday evenings. Question-and-answer sessions follow these remarks, offering opportunities for audiences to engage with speakers directly. Additionally, upper-level Council members are included in VIP receptions prior to events for discussion and photographs.

== Notable speakers ==
- President George W. Bush
- President George H. W. Bush
- President Ronald Reagan
- President Bill Clinton
- Prime Minister Tony Blair
- King Abdullah II of Jordan
- George Soros
- Condoleezza Rice
- President Vicente Fox
- General David Petraeus
- President Hamid Karzai
- Charles, Prince of Wales
- King Abdullah II of Jordan
- The Dalai Lama
- Joseph Nye, Dean of the Harvard Kennedy School of Government
- Dick Cheney
- John McCain
- Arkadi Ghukasyan, President of the Republic of Artsakh
- Jeffrey Sachs
- Timothy Geithner
- Lawrence Summers
- Peter Diamandis
- Elon Musk
- Kofi Annan
- Prince Bandar Bin Sultan Bin Abdul Aziz Al Saud, Ambassador of Saudi Arabia to the United States
- Edward Peck, Former United States Ambassador to Iraq
- Daniel Ayalon, Ambassador of Israel to the United States
- Philippe Kirsch, President of the International Criminal Court
- Caspar Weinberger, Former Secretary of Defense
- Donald Rumsfeld, Former Secretary of Defense
- James Wolfensohn, President of the World Bank
- Robert Gates
- Stanley McChrystal
- Steve Forbes

The council creates transcripts of the speeches and makes them available through its website archives.

== Student programs ==
The Council also has a high school program for which members can sponsor additional reservation fees to enable local high school groups to attend events. Students who participate in the Council's High School Program often engage in discussions with speakers prior to events. Internships are also available through the Council for local university students, enabling them to participate in event facilitation and general council operations.
