= Bill Greenwood (reporter) =

American journalist (1942–2020)

William Warren Greenwood (March 28, 1942 – January 19, 2020) was an American television reporter known for his work with ABC News.

Greenwood was hired by ABC News in October 1979. Prior to working with ABC News, Greenwood worked for stations WZRO in Jacksonville Beach., Florida, and WMBR in Jacksonville, before moving to WPDQ in 1964. In 1966, he joined station WWDC in Washington, D.C. He was part of the ABC News team that won the 2005 Edward R. Murrow Award for outstanding news coverage and the 2002 Peabody and DuPont awards for live coverage of the September 11 attacks.
