= Alex Stone =

American radio correspondent

- Occupation: Journalist
- Title: Radio Correspondent, ABC News

Alex Stone is a Los Angeles–based national radio correspondent for ABC News. Since joining ABC News, Stone has covered stories around the globe, including the 2004 Southeast Asia tsunami and the 2011 Japan earthquake and tsunami. In 2005 Stone spent weeks in New Orleans and the surrounding areas of Louisiana covering Hurricane Katrina and the storm's aftermath. He has covered Olympics in China, Canada, England, and South Korea. He has also covered numerous high-profile trials for ABC News, including the cases of Scott Peterson, Kobe Bryant, Michael Jackson and OJ Simpson.

Stone has covered countless wildfires. Before joining ABC News, he was trained by members of Boulder, Colorado's wildland team to meet federal firefighter classroom and physical fitness "pack test" requirements to be on the front lines of wildfires.

Stone joined the network in October 2004. Before ABC, he was a general assignment reporter at KOA Radio in Denver. While attending the University of Colorado at Boulder he reported the news on the weekdays and anchored Colorado's Morning News Saturday.

Stone began his career at KSRO Radio in Santa Rosa, California, while he attended high school. He started working at KSRO at the age of 12 for a program called Teens on Air. At 13 he joined the KSRO news team and covered local news for the morning show before school, and anchored the afternoon news after classes.

Stone has won several national Edward R. Murrow Awards for coverage of airport security, the nation's Emergency Alert System, the Japan tsunami, and the 2015 terror attack in San Bernardino, California.
