= This Week (American TV program) =

American Sunday morning political affairs program

- Genre: Public affairs/news analysis program
- Created by: Roone Arledge
- Presented by: David Brinkley; Sam Donaldson; Cokie Roberts; George Stephanopoulos; Jake Tapper; Christiane Amanpour; Martha Raddatz; Jonathan Karl
- Narrated by: Charles Gibson (2012–2014)
- Theme music composer: Score Productions (1981–2011); DreamArtists Studios (2011–present)
- Country of origin: United States
- Original language: English
- No. of seasons: 41

Production
- Production locations: ABC News Washington Bureau, Washington, D.C. (1981–2008, 2014–present); Newseum, Washington, D.C. (2008–2013); ABC News Headquarters, New York City (2011–2025); 7 Hudson Square, New York City (2025–present)
- Camera setup: Multi-camera
- Running time: 44 minutes
- Production company: ABC News Productions

Original release
- Network: ABC
- Release: November 15, 1981 – present

Related
- Issues and Answers

This Week, originally titled as This Week with David Brinkley and billed as This Week with George Stephanopoulos since 2012, is an American Sunday morning political affairs program airing on ABC. It premiered on November 15, 1981, replacing Issues and Answers with David Brinkley as its original anchor until his retirement in 1996. The program has been anchored by George Stephanopoulos since 2012, after first hosting it from 2002 to 2010. Martha Raddatz and Jonathan Karl have been co-hosts since 2016 and 2021, respectively. The program airs live at 9:00 a.m. Eastern Time although many stations air the program at a later slot to air local newscasts, especially those in other time zones. During the David Brinkley era, the program drew consistent #1 ratings and in the Stephanopoulos era generally runs in third place among the Sunday morning talk shows, behind Meet the Press and Face the Nation.

== History ==
In 1960, ABC launched its first Sunday talk show Issues and Answers, which featured policy discussions, prior to the age of political pundits dominating the talk shows. One of its early hosts was Howard K. Smith, who also had his own prime-time public affairs program Howard K. Smith: News and Comment air on the network during the 1962–1963 season. Among the program's later hosts was Bob Clark.

On November 15, 1981, David Brinkley came to the network from NBC News and was given full responsibility for the show, which was relaunched as This Week with a network time slot at 10:30 AM Eastern Time. During Brinkley's run, three major sponsors were part of the show: General Electric (which departed after taking control on NBC in 1987), Archer Daniels Midland and Merrill Lynch.

On November 10, 1996, David Brinkley retired as host of This Week but continued to appear on the program providing commentary segments until September 28, 1997. Following Brinkley's retirement, ABC News journalists Sam Donaldson and Cokie Roberts subsequently became co-hosts of This Week. Since 1981, the names of the primary anchors have been included with the show's title, such as This Week with David Brinkley and during this era, the program was billed as This Week with Sam Donaldson & Cokie Roberts (or This Week with Sam & Cokie).

George Stephanopoulos, who joined the panel in 1997, became the host of This Week on September 15, 2002; he ended his first tenure with the program on January 10, 2010, shortly after being named the co-host of Good Morning America. ABC News Senior White House Correspondent Jake Tapper served as the interim anchor from March to July 2010.

On April 20, 2008, production of This Week relocated to the Newseum in Washington, D.C., in a studio that overlooks the U.S. Capitol. In addition, the program began broadcasting in high definition, becoming the first Sunday morning talk show to broadcast in HD. Following the transition, the program discontinued the segments Images and Voices. ABC and This Week moved out of the Newseum in 2013 due to infrequent use of the studio and other facilities, with the former studio later being used for the Washington bureau of cable news channel Al Jazeera America.

Christiane Amanpour, a longtime world affairs correspondent at CNN, began as the program's host on August 1, 2010. During her first two months as host, the ratings for This Week reached their lowest point since 2003. In December 2011, it was announced that Amanpour would step down as anchor of the program, while returning to CNN in turn. On January 5, 2012, ABC News announced that Stephanopoulos would return as the host of This Week. With the return of Stephanopoulos as moderator, the program began using former Good Morning America and World News Tonight anchor Charles Gibson to perform the voice-over heard during the opening of each broadcast; this lasted until 2014.

In 2016, Martha Raddatz was named co-anchor of This Week, alternating each weekend with Stephanopoulos. By 2024, Donald Trump sued ABC over a This Week interview, in which George Stephanopoulos said Trump had been found liable for "rape", though the technical jury determination in E. Jean Carroll v. Donald J. Trump was for "sexual abuse". Though many lawyers thought ABC would win the suit due to the high legal bar for defamation of public figures, after Trump was elected president a second time, ABC settled and paid $15 to the Trump presidential library, $1 million in legal fees, and gave an apology.

On April 7, 2025, This Week's New York–based editions moved to its new home in 7 Hudson Square sharing space with ABC World News Tonight, 20/20, and special live event coverage for presidential elections, midterm elections, and other breaking news coverage.

As of 2026, when Stephanopoulos is not available, Raddatz and Jonathan Karl (who joined in 2021) alternate weekends hosting.

=== Ratings ===
In February 2009, the ratings gap between Meet the Press and its competitors – This Week and CBS' Face the Nation – began closing. Meet the Press posted its lowest ratings since NBC News correspondent David Gregory became moderator in early February of that year, with the February 1 telecast averaging just 3.9 million viewers. Face the Nation averaged 3.33 million total viewers, while This Week came in just behind with 3.32 million. This Week beat Meet the Press on January 11, when George Stephanopoulos interviewed President-Elect Barack Obama.

== Key features ==
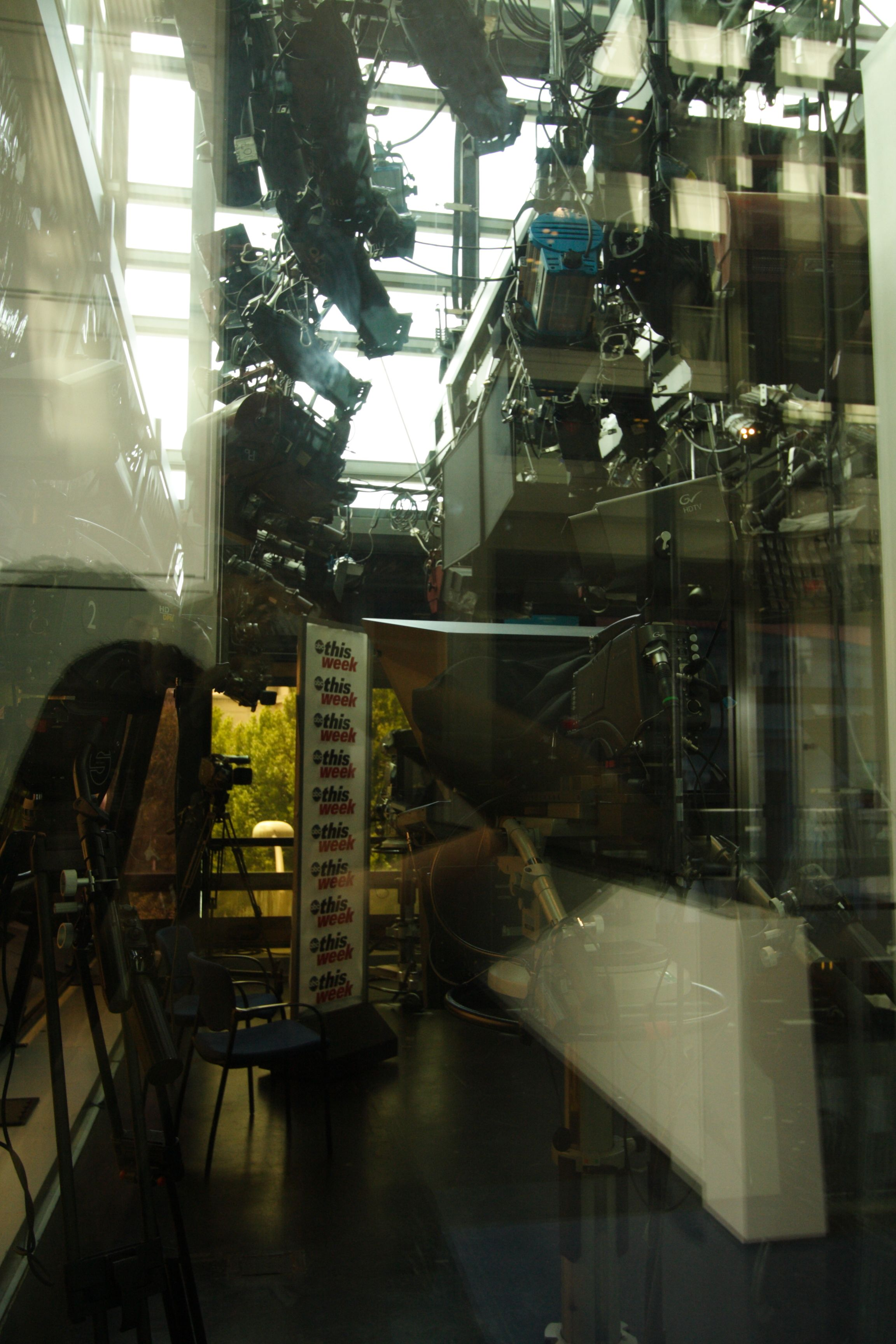
Former This Week Newseum studio

One of the key features of This Week is the roundtable discussion (currently branded as The Powerhouse Roundtable), which included pundits such as George Will and ABC News correspondents such as Sam Donaldson and Cokie Roberts, and other guests discussing the major issues of the week. Will, a regular panelist who was with the program from its launch with David Brinkley until he left ABC to join Fox News as a contributor in 2013, sometimes contributed short reports to the broadcast.

After Stephanopoulos became host in 2002, new segments were added to the program including:

- Images, a selection of photographs illustrating various news stories from the past week.
- In Memoriam, a listing of prominent deaths, including all reported military deaths, that occurred during the week.
- Sunday Funnies, excerpts from various late night talk and sketch comedy programs that aired during the week.
- Voices, excerpts from various interviews conducted during the week.

In 2010, Jake Tapper arranged with Bill Adair to get PolitiFact.com to fact check the statements made by panelists and guests featured on This Week.

== On-air staff ==
=== Hosts ===
- David Brinkley (November 15, 1981 – November 10, 1996)
- Sam Donaldson and Cokie Roberts (November 17, 1996 – September 8, 2002)
- George Stephanopoulos (September 15, 2002 – January 10, 2010, January 8, 2012 – present)
- Jake Tapper (March–July 2010)
- Christiane Amanpour (August 1, 2010 – December 25, 2011)
- Martha Raddatz, co-host (January 24, 2016 – present)
- Jonathan Karl, co-host (February 21, 2021 – present)

== Regular panelists ==
The Powerhouse Roundtable typically includes three or four panelists along with the moderator. Recurring panelists have included George Will, Cokie Roberts, Sam Donaldson, Bill Kristol, Fareed Zakaria, Martha Raddatz, Peggy Noonan, Victoria Clarke, Donna Brazile, Ann Coulter, Paul Krugman, Jay Carney, Claire Shipman, E.J. Dionne, Jr., Robert Reich, David Corn, Katrina vanden Heuvel, Mark Halperin, Joe Klein, Van Jones, David Brooks, Matthew Dowd, Mary Matalin, Ed Gillespie, Reince Priebus, Sarah Isgur and Chris Christie.

== International broadcasts ==
ABC News programming, including This Week, is shown weekly on the 24-hour news network OSN News in the Middle Eastern/North Africa region. It also airs in Australia on SBS, in Japan on NHK BS 1.

== See also ==
- ABC News
- Sunday morning talk show
- Issues and Answers (ABC News' predecessor program to This Week)
- Meet the Press
- Face the Nation
- Fox News Sunday
- State of the Union
