= Westwood One News =

Defunct Radio news network operated by Westwood One

- Country: United States
- Branding: Westwood One News

Programming
- Affiliations: CNN

Ownership
- Owner: Westwood One
- Parent: Cumulus Media

History
- Founded: July 30, 2014; 11 years ago
- Launch date: January 1, 2015; 10 years ago
- Closed: August 30, 2020; 4 years ago

Westwood One News was a radio news network launched on January 1, 2015, and operated by Westwood One through its parent company Cumulus Media. Using audio from CNN reports and correspondents, and anchored by Cumulus employees, it provided radio stations with hourly newscasts as well as voiced reports that could be individually used by member stations. It was discontinued on August 30, 2020.

Unlike most radio networks, the programming was unbranded as a "white-label" service with no mention of either Westwood One or CNN. The anchors and correspondents simply gave their names without saying what service they worked for. That way, Westwood One News could be carried under the station's local branding. For example, many Nash FM-branded country music ran the content under the title "Nash News."

== Background ==
Months after Cumulus acquired Westwood One in 2013, merging it with the former Cumulus Media Networks, the radio network acquired exclusive content from CNN. The news division was created months before Cumulus' deal with ABC News Radio was set to expire at the end of 2014. Until then, most Cumulus radio stations (including the former ABC-owned heritage stations carried over from the Citadel Broadcasting acquisition) used ABC News as their national news source. Cumulus also replaced the former NBC News Radio service previously distributed by the original Westwood One network, which was acquired under the "Dial Global" name in 2012. NBC News Radio had replaced Westwood One's CNN Radio service several years earlier. Westwood One also distributed CBS News Radio until December 2017.

Most of the first affiliates were Cumulus Media-owned stations, however as of February 2019 the network had expanded to over 900 affiliates.

On July 9, 2020, citing "extraordinary circumstances in the current marketplace" and a need to prioritize the company's resources, Westwood One announced that the service would be discontinued on August 30. Its final newscast aired at 11:30 p.m. ET that night. Most former affiliates—mostly Cumulus News and Talk stations—reaffiliated with ABC News Radio while a handful of others changed affiliations to Fox News Radio.
