= ABC News Radio =

ABC News Radio may refer to:

- ABC News Radio (United States) – American news radio service
- ABC NewsRadio – Australian news radio service
