= Nightline =

American late-night news program since 1980

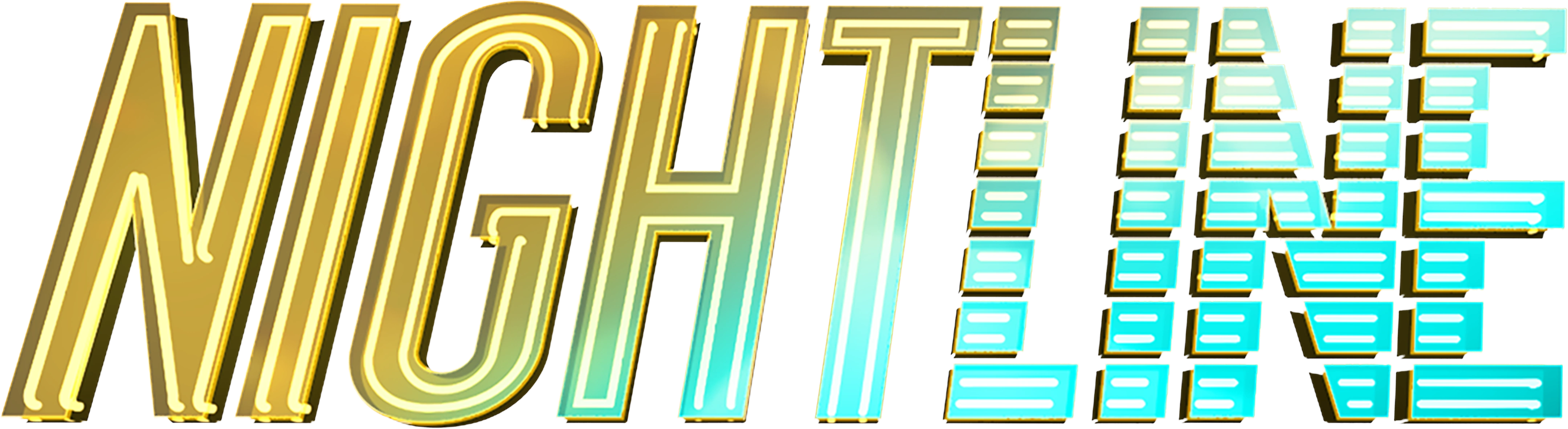
- Also known as: The Iran Crisis—America Held Hostage (1979); ABC News Nightline
- Genre: News program
- Created by: Roone Arledge
- Directed by: Paul Verciglio; Ron Halper
- Presented by: Byron Pitts; Juju Chang; (for past anchors, see section)
- Theme music composer: Score Productions (1979–1997); Edd Kalehoff (1997–2005); VideoHelper (2005–2014); Matthew Kajcienski and Adam Schoenberg (2018–present)
- Composers: Matthew Kajcienski and Adam Schoenberg (2018–present)
- Country of origin: United States
- Original language: English
- No. of seasons: 38

Production
- Executive producer: Eman Varoqua (2021–present)
- Production locations: ABC News Washington Bureau, Washington, D.C. (1980–2007); Times Square Studios, New York City (2005–2006, 2009–2025); ABC News Headquarters, New York City (2006–2009, 2025–present)
- Camera setup: Multi-camera
- Running time: 20 minutes (1980–1981); 30 minutes (1981–1983, 2013–present); 60 minutes (1983); 31 minutes (1983–2011); 25 minutes (2011–2013)
- Production company: ABC News Productions

Original release
- Network: ABC
- Release: November 8, 1979 – present

Related
- 20/20

Nightline (or ABC News Nightline) is ABC News' late-night television news program broadcast on ABC in the United States with a franchised formula to other networks and stations elsewhere in the world. Created by Roone Arledge, the program featured Ted Koppel as its main anchor from March 1980 until his retirement in November 2005. Its ongoing rotating anchors are Byron Pitts and Juju Chang. Nightline airs weeknights from 12:37 to 1:07 a.m., Eastern Time, after Jimmy Kimmel Live!, which had served as the program's lead-out from 2003 to 2012.

In 2002, Nightline was ranked 23rd on TV Guide's 50 Greatest TV Shows of All Time. The program has won four Peabody Awards, one in 2001, two in 2002 for the reports "Heart of Darkness" and "The Survivors," and one in 2022 for "The Appointment".

Through a video-sharing agreement with the BBC, Nightline repackages some of the BBC's output for an American audience. Segments from Nightline are shown in a condensed form on ABC's overnight news program World News Now. There was also a version of Nightline for sister cable channel Fusion.

== History ==
=== The Iran Crisis—America Held Hostage (1979) ===
The program began on November 8, 1979, four days after the start of the Iran hostage crisis. ABC News president Roone Arledge figured that the best way to compete against NBC's The Tonight Show Starring Johnny Carson was to update Americans on the latest news from Iran. At that time, the show was called The Iran Crisis—America Held Hostage: Day "xxx", where xxx represented the number of days that Iranians held the occupants of the U.S. Embassy in Tehran, Iran as hostages. At first, World News Tonight lead anchor Frank Reynolds hosted the 20-minute special reports.

Shortly after its creation, Reynolds stopped hosting the program. Ted Koppel, then ABC News's State Department Correspondent, took on the hosting duties. A few days later a producer had the idea of displaying the number of days on America Held Hostage (e.g., Day 15, Day 50, Day 150, etc.).

=== Ted Koppel's Nightline (1980–2005) ===
By the end of the hostage crisis in 1981 (after 444 days), the program – which had been retitled the previous year as Nightline – had entrenched itself on ABC's programming schedule, and made Koppel a national figure. ABC had previously used the title "Night Line" for a short-lived 1 a.m. talk show starring Les Crane that was broadcast over the network's New York City flagship station, WABC-TV, starting in 1963.

The program originally aired four nights a week (on Monday through Thursdays) until 1982, when the sketch comedy program Fridays was shifted to air after Nightline. By this time, the news program had expanded to 30 minutes. For much of its history, the program prided itself on providing a mix of investigative journalism and extended interviews (something that continues to be featured to this day, albeit at a reduced extent), which would look out of place on World News Tonight.

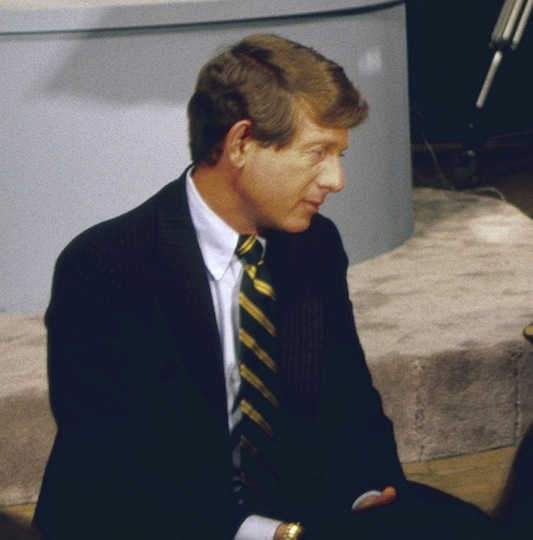
Ted Koppel in 1982

The format of the show featured an introduction by the host, then a taped piece on the specific topic of the night; then after a commercial break, there was a live interview related to the topic of the piece. In 1983, ABC attempted to change the program's format to feature multiple topics and expand it to one hour, as opposed to focusing on a single topic in a half-hour. This switch proved to be unsuccessful, and after a few months, the original format of the program was restored. Once the original format returned, reverting to a 31-minute structure, it remained unchanged through the end of Koppel's tenure; it was changed following his retirement.

The program remains unique in American media, considering its nightly broadcasts. Most other similar shows only air once a week, though usually in a prime time slot for a full hour. Nightline is usually less sensationalistic than the weekly news magazines (which often emphasize soft news programming, stories of such type – such as pop culture-related stories – Nightline has incorporated to a moderate degree following Koppel's departure), though the program has caused controversy on occasion.

In 1982, Koppel interviewed Palestine Liberation Organization (PLO) chief Yasser Arafat on the program, in which he had indicated that he would not accept conditions from the U.S. to recognize the PLO. In 1984, the program featured an interview with Supreme Court Chief Justice Warren Burger, marking his first live television appearance. In honor of the 40th Anniversary of D-Day in 1984, Nightline aired a special edition which "covered" the landings on Normandy as though modern television news, along with satellite reports, had existed at the time. The following year in 1985, the program conducted its first on-remote broadcast from South Africa.

In 1986, the program featured interviews with the Philippines' first female president, Corazon Aquino, and outgoing president Ferdinand Marcos, the latter of which tried to defend the extravagant lifestyle (including the extensive shoe collection) of his wife Imelda during the country's economic hardship. In an interview with Nightline in 1987, Colorado Democratic senator and 1988 presidential candidate Gary Hart admitted to having cheated on his wife, Lee Ludwig, with Donna Rice, in the aftermath of an exposé in the Miami Herald that revealed the affair, leading to his withdrawal from the presidential election. That year, Nightline broadcast for the first time in the Soviet Union. In 1988, Nightline conducted a special report on-location from Jerusalem.

External videos
- Koppel interviewed by Jeff Greenfield on Nightline: History in the Making and the Making of Television, May 30, 1996, C-SPAN

In 1996, Times Books published Nightline: History in the Making and the Making of Television, about the program's history up to that point, with author credits attributed to Koppel and Nightline producer Kyle Gibson. The book received numerous lackluster reviews. In Walter Goodman's review of the book for The New York Times, he observed "Ted Koppel announces in his introduction to Nightline that he did none of the interviews that went into the book and that although he 'influenced' and 'contributed' to it, 'in the final analysis Kyle wrote it.'" Ken Tucker in Entertainment Weekly pointed in an unfavorable manner to the book's use of the third person: "Throughout Nightline the book, the star is referred to in the third person: 'Koppel said' this or that; 'Koppel hadn't been asleep an hour when the phone rang.'" Frederic M. Biddle of The Boston Globe wrote "This book reminds us not only that good television doesn't necessarily translate into scintillating prose, but that behind every successful journalist lurks a good editor – who in this case didn't show up."

==== Memorable subjects ====
During Ted Koppel's tenure as anchor (and on rare occasions since his departure), Nightline devoted each episode to a unique subject. Since its inception, the program has covered many subjects (science, education, politics, economics, society, and breaking news). Many candidates for government offices, such as David Duke (in November 1991), have appeared on Nightline to try to promote themselves. Seeing that there are a large number of prisons in the United States, it created an ongoing series in 1994 called "Crime and Punishment". The program also aired a series of episodes called "America: In Black and White" dealing with individual aspects of American race relations, and another on homosexuality titled "A Matter of Choice?".

Over the years, Nightline had a number of technological firsts. The program did the first live report from the base of Mount Everest. In November 1992, science reporter Michael Guillen did the first live broadcast from Antarctica. There were times when a major breaking news story occurred as late as 11:00 p.m. Eastern Time, resulting in the subject of that night's edition being changed in order to cover the story in some form of detail, depending on the depth of information available at the time of broadcast. Examples of this were the deaths of John Lennon (1980) and Yasser Arafat (2004).

Nightline also held a series of town hall meetings; these included the Israeli-Palestinian Town Meeting in 1987, one with Nelson Mandela on June 21, 1990, and one discussing the War in Iraq in 2003. The first such "Town Meeting", in 1987, was an extended edition (running for four hours and 12 minutes, until 3:47 a.m. Eastern Time, on the night of its broadcast) discussing the AIDS epidemic of that period in the U.S. A major portion of the episode was devoted to interviews where important people were asked tough questions on the spot. Another series of town hall meetings featured public discussions and appearances by Japanese officials on the poor performance of American business during the 1980s, contrasted with the success of Japanese businesses. These town hall meetings coincided with the corporate takeovers of U.S. companies by Japanese corporations during the early 1990s (such as MCA by Matsushita, and CBS Records and Columbia Pictures by Sony Corporation).

What had been intended to be a benign episode dedicated to the 40th anniversary of Jackie Robinson breaking Major League Baseball's color barrier ended up being remembered for one of the show's controversial moments. The April 6, 1987 broadcast included longtime Los Angeles Dodgers executive Al Campanis, who had been with the franchise since before Robinson's debut. When Ted Koppel asked Campanis about why there were so few black field managers or general managers in the sport, Campanis responded awkwardly, saying that blacks may lack the "necessities" to succeed in those positions. Despite Koppel offering Campanis numerous chances to clarify or retract his remark (asking Campanis several times "Do you really believe that?"), Campanis' subsequent responses only worsened his position. Koppel ultimately scolded Campanis on-air for proposing the "same kind of garbage" that Robinson's critics and skeptics had peddled in 1947. Shortly after the interview, the Dodgers fired Campanis.

Later in 1987, the program broadcast an exclusive interview with televangelists Jim and Tammy Faye Bakker, following the former's sex scandal that brought down their PTL ministry. On December 3, 1990, Nightline played Madonna's controversial music video "Justify My Love" in its entirety, then interviewed Madonna live about the video's sexual content and censorship. The video contained imagery of sadomasochism, voyeurism and bisexuality. When asked whether she stood to make more money selling the video than airing it on MTV, she shrugged and answered, "Yeah, so? Lucky me." She also mentioned that the banning was hypocritical, as male artists were able to show music videos on the channel which contained sexist and violent imagery. She also mentioned that in her "Vogue" music video she had worn a see-through lace top which exposed her breasts, but this was passed by the channel.

In 1997, Nightline aired "ABC Exclusive" footage of the trial of former Cambodian dictator Pol Pot, in violation of a verbal agreement between ABC News and freelance journalist Nate Thayer to use the footage of Pot's trial. Thayer later sued Koppel and ABC News for $30 million in punitive damages and unspecified compensatory damages.

==== Reading of the names ====
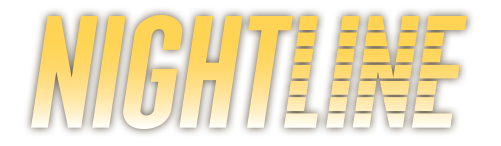
Former logo, used from January 1998 to December 2017. This variant (which was displayed upright until November 2002) is based on the program's original 1980–97 logo.

On April 30, 2004, Koppel read the names of members of the United States Armed Forces who were killed in the Iraq War since it began in March 2003. This prompted controversy from conservatives who believed that Koppel was making a political statement, and from management at Hunt Valley, Maryland–based television station owner Sinclair Broadcast Group, which felt that ABC was undermining the war effort in Iraq; in protest, ordered forced its ABC-affiliated stations not to air that night's edition, and instead had the stations air a special in which the "merits" of the war would be debated. Sinclair invited Koppel to participate in the replacement program, but he declined.

Others, most notably the television columnist for The Washington Post, thought it was a ratings stunt for sweeps; indeed Nightline was the highest-rated program during that time period, and had about 30% more viewers than other editions of the program which aired that week. ABC responded to the controversy, saying that the program was meant to be "an expression of respect which seeks to honor those who have laid down their lives for this country."

Koppel repeated the format on May 28, 2004, reading the names of service members killed in the war in Afghanistan, and on May 30, 2005, reading the names of all service members killed in Afghanistan or Iraq between the last program and the preparation of the program. This time, all of Sinclair's ABC stations aired the program as scheduled.

==== Ratings and threats of cancellation ====
For many years, rumors had been spread about the show's possible cancellation. However, during the so-called "late night wars" of 1993, when the Late Show with David Letterman began competing with The Tonight Show with Jay Leno, some in the industry believed that Nightline would wind up in first place. On occasion, when a significant news story occurred, Nightline would top its entertainment rivals in the ratings.

In 2002, ABC attempted to hire David Letterman away from CBS, a move that would likely have forced the network to cancel Nightline. However, Letterman opted to sign a renewed contract with CBS to remain host of the Late Show. An unverified story suggested that Letterman would have made the move had a Letterman talk show on ABC started at 12:05 a.m. Eastern Time in order to preserve Nightline. When ABC debuted Jimmy Kimmel Live! as a late-night talk competitor to Tonight and the Late Show in January 2003, it was placed at the 12:06 a.m. Eastern timeslot instead of the 11:35 p.m. slot occupied at the time by Nightline, again preventing its cancellation.

==== Koppel's final broadcast and "Closing Thought" ====
In March 2005, Ted Koppel announced that he would be leaving the show at the end of his contract. On November 22, 2005, Koppel retired from Nightline after 25 years as anchor of the program, and left ABC News after 42 years with the network, although it was an early departure from both as his contract was not set to expire until December.

Koppel's final broadcast of Nightline did not feature clips, memorable interviews or famous moments from his tenure as host, as would be typical when an anchor retires. Instead, it featured Koppel's 1995 interview with college professor Morrie Schwartz, who was suffering with amyotrophic lateral sclerosis. For this broadcast, Koppel interviewed sports journalist Mitch Albom, who had been a student of Schwartz. Albom talked about how the Nightline interviews led and inspired him into contacting Schwartz personally, and then visiting him weekly. These visits became the basis of the book Tuesdays with Morrie, chronicling lessons about life learned from Schwartz. The interview was significant because Morrie was actually interviewed 3 times including the 1995 interview which took place a couple weeks before Morrie's death.

Every so often, Koppel ended the program with a "Closing Thought", in which Koppel usually expressed his opinion on the subject of the night's broadcast. On his final night, urging viewers to continue watching the program, Koppel concluded his final Nightline broadcast with the following "Closing Thought":

There's this quiz I give to some of our young interns when they first arrive at Nightline. I didn't do it with the last batch; it's a little too close to home. "How many of you", I'll ask, "can tell me anything about Eric Sevareid?" Blank stares. "How about Howard K. Smith or Frank Reynolds?" Not a twitch of recognition. "Chet Huntley? John Chancellor?" Still nothing. "David Brinkley" sometimes causes a hand or two to be raised, and Walter Cronkite may be glad to learn that a lot of young people still have a vague recollection that he once worked in television news.
What none of these young men and women in their late teens and early twenties appreciates, until I point it out to them, is that they have just heard the names of seven anchormen or commentators who were once so famous that everyone in the country knew their names. Everybody.
Trust me, the transition from one anchor to another is not that big a deal. Cronkite begat Rather, Chancellor begat Brokaw, Reynolds begat Jennings. And each of them did a pretty fair job in his own right. You've always been very nice to me, so give this new anchor team for Nightline a fair break. If you don't, I promise you the network will just put another comedy show in this time slot. And then you'll be sorry. That's our report for tonight, I'm Ted Koppel in Washington, [and] from all of us here at ABC News, good night.

=== Post-Koppel Nightline (2005–present) ===
British journalist and producer James Goldston was appointed as the program's executive producer in 2005. He opted to scrap the format of the existing broadcast, and on November 28, 2005, replaced Koppel with a three-anchor team of Martin Bashir (Goldston's compatriot and colleague on ITV's Living with Michael Jackson) and Cynthia McFadden at Times Square Studios in New York City and Terry Moran in Washington, D.C.

Along with the new anchors, Nightline began airing live each night (outside of pre-taped story packages) and switched to a multi-topic format (similar to the format attempted during the short-lived 1983 expansion to an hour-long broadcast, although condensed to fit a half-hour timeslot) – that covers multiple stories in each broadcast. The conversion to a multi-topic format has received some criticism due to the fact that it is more difficult to focus on a story subject in depth when there is much less time devoted to it, and that more stories seen on the program seem to focus more on popular culture, rather than news events. However, ratings increased after the new format was implemented, even beating the Late Show with David Letterman for three consecutive weeks in August 2006 and again in 2008.

On July 11, 2006, in his first appearance on the program since leaving Nightline in November 2005, Ted Koppel made a surprise appearance on that night's broadcast to discuss the prisoner situation at the Guantanamo Bay detention camp with co-anchor Terry Moran, and to discuss his then upcoming series for the Discovery Channel.

On August 7, 2006, ABC shut down full-time Nightline production from Times Square and moved the program to the ABC News Headquarters in Lincoln Square, citing high production costs and logistical problems, though some special editions still do originate from Times Square Studios. In 2009, Nightline announced that an online program was in development that would be hosted by the show's anchors through Twitter, encouraging viewer discussion on the website.

In a 2008 interview with correspondent Bob Woodruff featured on the program, former United States Senator and 2004 Democratic presidential candidate John Edwards admitted to having had an adulterous affair unbeknownst his wife, Elizabeth, with a campaign staffer (later identified as Rielle Hunter) who worked on his campaign for the then-forthcoming 2008 presidential election, which he would drop out of. In the 2009–2010 television season, the series narrowly beat Late Show with David Letterman as the highest-rated late-night program in the United States in terms of total viewers, assisted by the Tonight Show conflict and notable interviews with Bill Clinton, Terry Jones, and Sarah Palin.

==== 2010s ====
Logo used from 2003 to 2018

Former logo, used from January 2018 to March 2025

In August 2010, Martin Bashir left Nightline to serve as a correspondent with NBC News and host a daytime news/interview program on MSNBC; he was subsequently replaced by Bill Weir.

On January 20, 2011, ABC News president Ben Sherwood announced that Jimmy Kimmel Live! (for which Nightline had been serving as its lead-in since that program premiered in January 2003) would have its start time moved five minutes earlier to 12:00 a.m. Eastern Time, reducing Nightline's running time from 31 to 25 minutes. It was also announced that ABC would produce up to 13 hours of prime-time news content under the Nightline brand. For the 2011–2012 television season, Nightline again placed as the most-watched late-night television program among the major networks.

In 2011, Goldston departed as executive producer to move to Good Morning America.

On August 21, 2012, ABC announced that the program would switch timeslots with Jimmy Kimmel Live! beginning January 8, 2013: Nightline was moved one hour later to 12:35 a.m. Eastern Time, while Kimmel moved to the program's former 11:35 p.m. timeslot, in order to compete with fellow late night talk shows The Tonight Show and the Late Show with David Letterman. Upon the move, Nightline was also expanded to 30 minutes.

As part of this move, ABC also announced that it would launch a prime time news magazine extension of Nightline, which was originally scheduled to premiere on March 1, 2013; the premiere of this program – later retitled The Lookout, which focuses mainly on consumer reports and is produced by the Nightline staff – was subsequently pushed back to May 29, 2013, airing in a Wednesday 10:00 p.m. Eastern timeslot. Another prime time version of Nightline, Nightline Prime, premiered on March 15, 2014, in a Saturday 9:00 p.m. Eastern timeslot; this series featured reporters using small cameras to cover stories from within.

In October 2013, Good Morning America weekend co-anchor Dan Harris was named as a co-anchor of Nightline, replacing Bill Weir (who had recently left ABC News to become a correspondent for CNN). In August 2014, Cynthia McFadden left Nightline and ABC News to become a correspondent for NBC News, and was replaced as co-anchor by existing ABC News correspondent (and frequent contributor to the program) Juju Chang. On December 18, 2014, it was announced that Dan Abrams would step down as an anchor of the program after that night's broadcast (although he would remain with ABC News as a correspondent and legal analyst), and would be replaced by Byron Pitts effective the following day (December 19).

==== 2020s ====
From March 16, 2020, Nightline presented extended coverage of the initial impact of the COVID-19 pandemic in the United States; co-anchor Pitts explained that the show was "leaning more heavily into [its] roots", and was consistent with the show itself having been "born in response to a crisis, giving facts, context and, when possible, comfort as our nation dealt with the Iran hostages". It was also announced that the program would temporarily return to its former 11:35 p.m. time slot from March 17 to April 10, replacing Jimmy Kimmel Live! (which went on hiatus with reruns until March 30, when the program returned with original episodes produced from Kimmel's home). Nightline was the highest-rated late-night program that week in total and key demographic viewership.

On March 24, 2020, Nightline marked its 40th anniversary; Ted Koppel made a guest appearance, where he discussed his wife's vulnerability to COVID-19 due to chronic obstructive pulmonary disease (COPD), and opined that "it's time more than ever in this country to come to the realization that what we need more than anything else, is reliable, credible journalists."

In 2022, ABC News launched a sister newsmagazine, IMPACT x Nightline, that streams on Hulu.

On March 24, 2025, as part of the program's 45th anniversary, Nightline reintroduced the all-caps italicized version of the 1997 logo (which itself was introduced in 2003), albeit in gold and cyan color. According to ABC News, they reintroduced the old logo to honor its iconic legacy, blending elements from its original look with an updated, modern design. As part of celebration, Byron Pitts and Juju Chang anchored the special episode together and feature archival footage and recount “Nightline's” place in journalism. At the same time, the show's production was moved from Times Square Studios to Studio 4E in The Walt Disney Company's new 7 Hudson Square headquarters in New York.

== On-air staff ==
=== Current on-air staff ===
==== Anchors ====
- Byron Pitts (2014–present)
- Juju Chang (2014–present)
- Stephanie Ramos (2024–present)

Note: The anchors alternate hosting duties, without all anchors appearing on every night.

==== Correspondent ====
- Ashan Singh (2024–present; 2022–2024 multiplatform reporter)

=== Former on-air staff ===
==== Anchors ====
- Ted Koppel (1980–2005)
- Chris Bury (2002–2005)
- Martin Bashir (2005–2010)
- Terry Moran (2005–2013)
- Cynthia McFadden (2005–2014)
- Bill Weir (2010–2013)
- Dan Abrams (2013–2014)
- Dan Harris (2013–2019)

== International broadcasts ==
Country	Network(s)	Weekly schedule (local time)
Australia	SBS Viceland	8:10 a.m. (AET)
Japan	NHK BS1	4:30 p.m. (JST)
Canada	ABC; CHCH	Available through ABC stations; Airs at 12:00 a.m. on CHCH

== Nightline on Fusion ==
On February 12, 2015, it was announced that ABC and Univision would launch a new version of Nightline on Fusion called Nightline on Fusion. It was hosted by Gio Benitez and Kimberly Brooks and aired on Tuesdays at 9 pm eastern with repeats at other times. The show was similar to the ABC version and shares resources and correspondents. However, the Fusion version put more emphasis on stories from the flagship program which resonate with Fusion's younger, more culturally diverse target audience. It also featured original content produced for Fusion.

== See also ==
- List of late-night network TV programs
- Lateline, an Australian program similar to Nightline
