= The Michael Jackson Interview: The Footage You Were Never Meant To See =

- Genre: Documentary
- Presented by: Maury Povich
- Starring: Michael Jackson; Martin Bashir; Debbie Rowe; Joseph Jackson; Katherine Jackson, Jermaine Jackson; Elizabeth Taylor; Karen Faye
- Country of origin: United Kingdom

Production
- Producer: Marc Schaffel

Original release
- Network: Sky One
- Release: February 20, 2003

The Michael Jackson Interview: The Footage You Were Never Meant To See is a television documentary film released as a rebuttal to Living with Michael Jackson, in which the British journalist Martin Bashir interviewed the American singer Michael Jackson from May 2002 to January 2003. Jackson felt betrayed by Bashir and said that Living with Michael Jackson gave a distorted picture of his behavior and conduct as a father. It was broadcast on February 20, 2003, on Fox in the US, and on February 24 on Sky One in the UK.

== Synopsis ==
The Michael Jackson Interview: The Footage You Were Never Meant To See aired on Fox in the United States. NBC reportedly bid $5 million for the footage, but Jackson sold the footage to Fox for $1.6 million. It aired on Sky One in the United Kingdom. It was presented by Maury Povich and contains material which Bashir omitted. It also features new interviews with people close to Jackson which Povich states in the documentary were not paid for their interviews, such as his former wife Debbie Rowe, parents Joseph and Katherine, brother Jermaine and close friend Elizabeth Taylor. In this interview, Rowe claimed it was at her request that the children wore masks in public. She also pointed out that the concept of "sharing a bed" can be misunderstood: for example, she herself likes watching television in bed; when she has a visitor, they both watch television together in bed. It also contains interviews with Bashir giving very different statements to what he had previously given in interviews and in the voice-overs. He is shown praising Jackson as a father saying that he thinks it is wonderful that he allows children to come to Neverland.

== Reception ==
In the United States, 14 million watched The Michael Jackson Interview: The Footage You Were Never Meant To See on Fox. The program's United Kingdom debut on Sky One drew more than two million viewers, making it the third-biggest debut in Sky One's history.
