= Iran, the Most Dangerous Nation? =

2006 American documentary film

- Produced by: Ted Koppel
- Release date: 2006

Koppel on Discovery: Iran, The most Dangerous Nation? is a documentary about post-revolution Iran and Iran-United States conflicts, made by Ted Koppel Team in Iran (2006).

Although facts suggest otherwise, it is claimed in the movie that the Koppel team was the last group of American journalists allowed into Iran before the Iranian government stopped granting journalist visas in 2006. This was a direct response to claims that the U.S. blocked Iranian journalists from coming to the U.S. Koppel, whose groundbreaking coverage of the Iran hostage crisis morphed into ABC's "Nightline" in 1980, traveled throughout Iran for three weeks for the two-hour special.

Koppel on Discovery is produced by Discovery Channel managing editor, Ted Koppel and executive producer Tom Bettag.

== See also ==
- Politics of Iran
