= Dan Harris (journalist) =

American journalist and author (born 1971)

- Born: Daniel B. Harris; July 26, 1971 (age 55); Newton, Massachusetts, U.S.
- Education: Colby College (BA)
- Occupations: Journalist, author, podcast host
- Notable credits: 10% Happier; ABC News (2000–2021); Good Morning America (2010–2021); Nightline (2013–2016)
- Spouse: Bianca Harris (m. 2009)
- Children: 1

Daniel B. Harris (born July 26, 1971) is an American author, podcast host, and former ABC News anchor and correspondent.

== Early life and education ==
Harris is the son of Nancy Lee Harris and Jay R. Harris. His father was professor emeritus in the radiation oncology residency program at Harvard University; his mother is a pathologist at Massachusetts General Hospital in Boston and an expert on lymphomas. His younger brother, Matthew Carmichael Harris, is a venture capitalist.

Harris graduated in 1993 from Colby College in Waterville, Maine.

== Career ==
=== Journalism ===
Harris began his career as an anchor for WLBZ in Bangor, Maine. He then worked for two years at WCSH in Portland, Maine, as an anchor and political reporter. From 1997 to 2000 he was an anchor at New England Cable News.

He joined ABC News in 2000. He anchored World News Sunday from 2006 to 2011 and frequently anchored World News, ABC World News Tonight weekend editions and Nightline. He is also a frequent contributor to World News. He also anchored ABC's coverage of Hurricane Katrina in September 2005. In October 2010, he was named the new co-anchor for the weekend edition of Good Morning America. In October 2013, he was named a co-anchor for Nightline, succeeding Bill Weir. In August 2021, Harris announced that he would be leaving ABC News to focus on his podcast and meditation work. He departed ABC News on September 26, 2021.

In addition to reporting on a range of natural disasters and several mass shootings, and from multiple combat zones, Harris led the network's reporting on religion, especially evangelicalism, and once spent 48 hours in solitary confinement for a story on criminal justice.

On March 1, 2016, it was announced that Harris would become the host of the game show 500 Questions, replacing Richard Quest.

=== Meditation and authorship ===
Harris encourages the use of meditation, and he uses a method of watching the breath. His 10% Happier with Dan Harris podcast covers topics including meditation, stress, anxiety, sleep, relationships, and productivity, drawing on both Buddhist traditions and modern science. Guests include meditation teachers, psychologists, researchers, and public figures.

Harris' book, 10% Happier: How I Tamed the Voice in My Head, Reduced Stress Without Losing My Edge, and Found Self-Help That Really Works – a True Story, was published in March 2014. Harris has said that his self-examination, abandonment of drugs, and adoption of meditation were prompted by an on-air panic attack in 2004. In the book, Harris recounts how he resolved the apparent conflict between meditation-induced equanimity and the aggressive competitiveness required for success as a TV news journalist.

A meditation smartphone application was launched in 2015 under the name Ten Percent Happier. In September 2024, the app rebranded to Happier, at which point Harris departed the company, citing 'significant differences' with co-founders that 'could not be resolved.' Harris retained the 10% Happier podcast, taking full ownership on March 1, 2025. In December 2025, he launched a new app, called 10% with Dan Harris, available on iOS and Android.

== Personal life ==
Harris is married to Dr. Bianca Harris; they have a son. Although he refers to himself as "half-Jewish“ and “culturally Jewish", he identifies as a Buddhist.

In high school Harris played the drums in a band with the bassist for the rock band The Unband.

== Awards ==
Harris received an Edward R. Murrow Award for his reporting on a young Iraqi man who received the help he needed in order to move to America, and in 2009 won an Emmy Award for his Nightline report, "How to Buy a Child in Ten Hours".

He has been awarded honorary doctorates by his alma mater Colby College and by the Massachusetts College of Liberal Arts.

== Books ==
- 10% Happier: How I Tamed the Voice in My Head, Reduced Stress Without Losing My Edge, and Found Self-Help That Actually Works – A True Story (2014) — #1 New York Times bestseller ISBN 9781444799064
- Meditation for Fidgety Skeptics: A 10% Happier How-to Book (2017), co-authored with Jeff Warren and Carlye Adler ISBN 9780399588945
- Even You Can Meditate: Find the Time, the Motivation, and the Right Practice for You (Audible Original, 2025), co-created with Sebene Selassie

== See also ==
- Jewish Buddhists
