= I-Caught =

- Also known as: i-CAUGHT
- Presented by: Bill Weir
- Country of origin: United States
- No. of episodes: 6

Production
- Running time: 60 minutes

Original release
- Network: ABC
- Release: August 7 – September 11, 2007

I-Caught (rendered as "i-CAUGHT") was an ABC News newsmagazine program hosted by Bill Weir which ran from August 7 to September 11, 2007, at 10:00 PM ET. Originally a midseason project, the series aired during the summer.

i-CAUGHT featured news stories based on video images captured by cell phones, webcams, surveillance cams, and the internet – as well as looking at what happens to the people involved after their video is seen publicly.

Among those featured in the premiere was liquid dancer David Bernal, better known to the video-viewing public as David Elsewhere.
