= Jeff Warren =

Canadian author and meditation teacher (b. 1971)

- Born: Jeffrey Warren; March 11, 1971 (age 55); Toronto, Ontario, Canada
- Education: B.A., Literature
- Alma mater: McGill University
- Occupations: Author, meditation teacher
- Works: The Head Trip, Meditation for Fidgety Skeptics

Jeffrey Warren (born March 11, 1971) is a Canadian author and meditation teacher. He is the author of The Head Trip: Adventures on the Wheel of Consciousness, which The Guardian named as one of the ten best books on consciousness, and co-author of The New York Times bestseller Meditation for Fidgety Skeptics with Dan Harris and Caryle Adler. He is the founder of the Toronto-based meditation group The Consciousness Explorers Club.

== Career ==
Warren is from Toronto, Ontario, Canada. He studied literature at McGill University in Montreal, where he suffered a traumatic injury after falling 30 feet out of a tree, breaking his neck. He claimed that this event spurred his interest in consciousness as it changed his experience of the world and worsened his ADHD.

He went on to work as a producer at the Canadian Broadcasting Corporation's (CBC Radio) current-affairs radio show, The Current,

He wrote The Head Trip: Adventures on the Wheel of Consciousness and co-authored Meditation for Fidgety Skeptics.

He collaborated with meditation app Calm to create a beginner-friendly meditation series (How to Meditate) and daily meditation sessions (The Daily Trip).

== Personal life ==
Warren is married to Canadian journalist Sarah Barmak.

== Books ==
- The Head Trip: Adventures on the Wheel of Consciousness (2007) ISBN 9781400064847

Published in 2007 by Random House (US), Random House of Canada (Canada), and Oneworld Publications (UK), and translated into Italian and Korean.

- Meditation for Fidgety Skeptics: A 10% Happier How-to Book (2017), co-authored with Dan Harris and Carlye Adler ISBN 9780399588945

Published in 2017 by Penguin Random House (US).
