= Bill Weir =

American television journalist

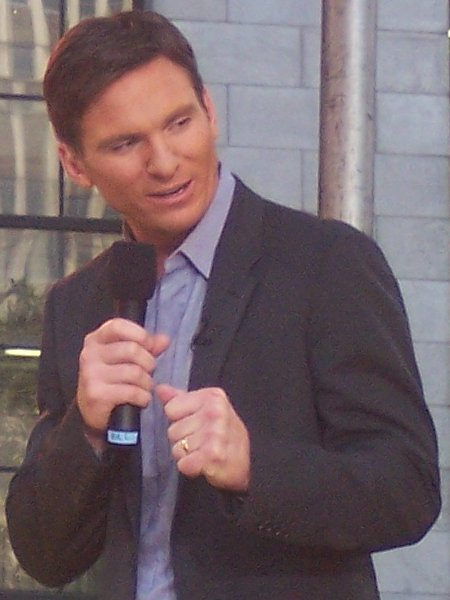
- Born: 1967 (age 58–59); Milwaukee, Wisconsin, U.S.
- Occupation: Journalist
- Years active: 1991–present

William Francis Weir (born 1967) is an American television journalist and author based in Manhattan. Weir is a correspondent and anchor for CNN, and the creator and host of the global documentary series "The Wonder List with Bill Weir." He is the former co-anchor of Nightline on ABC television network in the United States and co-anchored the weekend edition of Good Morning America from 2004 to 2010. His debut book, Life as We Know It (Can Be), confronts the biggest threats to life as we know it and explores ideas for building a more promising future, drawing on his reporting experience as CNN's Chief Climate Correspondent and as the host of The Wonder List.

== Early life and education ==
Weir was born in Milwaukee, Wisconsin, USA in 1967. At an early age, his parents divorced and he attended 17 schools in six states as his devout Christian mother followed what she believed were dreams from God. After graduating from Victory Christian High School in Tulsa, Oklahoma he briefly attended Oral Roberts University before transferring to Pepperdine University in Malibu, California where he earned a degree in journalism and creative writing.

== Career ==
Weir began his career in 1991 as a general assignment reporter and weekend sportscaster at KAAL in Austin, Minnesota. He then became the sports anchor at WLUK in Green Bay, Wisconsin, and went on to anchor the WGN Morning News on WGN in Chicago from 1995 to 1998. Weir was sports anchor at KABC-TV in Los Angeles from 1998 to 2002, where he hosted the popular weekly Monday Night Live program which aired after Monday Night Football. Between 2002 and 2004, he developed, wrote and hosted three television pilots for the USA and FX Networks.

Weir joined ABC News in 2004 where he covered breaking news and global trends such as the economic rise of China and India, signature features on Good Morning America. World News devoted air time to his reports from Africa, the Middle East and the South Pacific. He went to New Orleans after Hurricane Katrina, as well as to Afghanistan in 2010 and led the network's coverage of Iraq, Where Things Stand at the height of the American troop surge. Weir has anchored several launches and landings of the Space Shuttle, was the first American to broadcast live from Tibet and led off 2007's Earth Day special with an unprecedented underwater live report from the Great Barrier Reef.

In June 2007, Weir was named anchor of the short-lived ABC News magazine "iCaught." As a writer and anchor at ABC, he produced special hours for the network on topics ranging from religion to brain science to the rise and fall of General Motors. In July 2010, he was named co-anchor, joining Terry Moran and Cynthia McFadden on Nightline, replacing Martin Bashir. Bill Weir's final story for Nightline, a piece about the popular photography blog Humans of New York, aired Friday, October 11, 2013, on ABC. In an interview with blog creator Brandon Stanton, Weir said, "I'm a jaded, cynical journalist... The things that tend to get me are the smaller moments of human connection. I remember one time in India, I saw a legless child being handed off between his father and mother. It was simple but that really moved me. Ever since I had a child of my own, I've been really vulnerable to displays of parental love." CNN announced on October 12, 2013, that Bill was joining the network as an anchor and Chief Innovation Correspondent. In 2015, CNN began broadcasting The Wonder List with Bill Weir. On November 12, 2019, Weir hosted the annual Krause Lecture at New England boarding school, Choate Rosemary Hall. Bill Weir, his wife, and his daughter live in New York City.

== Personal life ==
Weir was married to and divorced from Angela Weir. They have a daughter Olivia born on December 19, 2003. Weir married Kelly Dowd after proposing to her in September 2019. They have a son named William River, born in 2020.

== See also ==
- New Yorkers in journalism
