= Nancy Lee Harris =

American pathologist

For the Irish playwright and screenwriter, see Nancy Harris.

Nancy Lee Harris is an educator and medical professional. She serves as a professor of pathology at Harvard Medical School and is a physician at Massachusetts General Hospital. She is also an editor with the New England Journal of Medicine. Harris has held a range of academic and clinical leadership roles in pathology, including positions related to hematopathology, surgical pathology, anatomic pathology, and pathology residency and fellowship training programs. Her research focuses on blood malignancies and lymphoid neoplasms.

== Family ==
Harries is married to Jay R. Harris, who is a radiation oncology professor at Harvard Medical School. One son Dan Harris, was the co-anchor of the weekend edition of Good Morning America from 2010 to 2010 and is married to Dr. Bianca Harris. Another son, Matthew Carmichael Harris, is a venture capitalist and married to filmmaker Jessica Glass.

== Education and training ==
Nancy Lee Harris performed her internship in Internal Medicine at Washington University Barnes-Jewish Hospital. She then moved to Boston and completed her residency in Anatomic and Clinical pathology at Beth Israel Deaconess Medical Center. Harris rounded out her education by completing a fellowship in Hematopathology at Massachusetts General Hospital and is currently board certified in Anatomy pathology and Clinical pathology.

Harris joined Massachusetts General Hospital in 1980 and has since held a variety of different positions. She started off as the Director of Hematopathology and remained the director until 2009. In 1985, she also became the Director of Surgical Pathology until 1992 when she transitioned to the Director of Anatomic Pathology. She remained the Director of Anatomic Pathology until 1998. In 1996, although she was already the Director of Hematopathology and the Director of Anatomic Pathology, Harris added a third title: Director of Anatomic and Clinical Pathology Residency Program. Harris was in charge of the residency program until 2001. When arriving in 1980, Harris also took on the job of being the Director of Hematopathology Fellowship Program until 2004. Harris now serves as the editor of case records of Massachusetts General Hospital for the New England Journal of Medicine (NEJM).

== Awards and publications ==
Harris mainly focuses her research on blood malignancies like lymphoma; however, she is also interested in lymphoid neoplasms. Along with the World Health Organization and other scientists, Harris helped to develop the Revised European American Classification of Lymphoid Neoplasms around 2001. This was the first time anyone had come to an international consensus on neoplasm taxonomy. The Revised European American Classification of Lymphoid Neoplasms was updated in 2008.

A second edition of the Hematopathology reference book was published by Harris and her fellow international experts in September 2016. The book includes updated diagnostic techniques as well as suggestions for molecular and genetic testing. In the last 5 years on top of helping to author this new reference book, Harris has been published over 21 times on PubMed.

Harris became the editor for NEJM of the case records found in Massachusetts General Hospital beginning in 2002 and has since discussed 38 pathological mysteries in her first 10 years. However, because of rapid technological advancement as well as the development of new diagnostic tools, pathological mysteries are becoming harder and harder to find leaving Harris with a smaller sample size of mysteries to review.

For all of her hard work, outstanding professional career, and contributions to medicine, Harris was awarded the J. E. Wallace Sterling Lifetime Achievement Award in Medicine from Stanford University.
