= Cynthia McFadden =

American television journalist (born 1956)

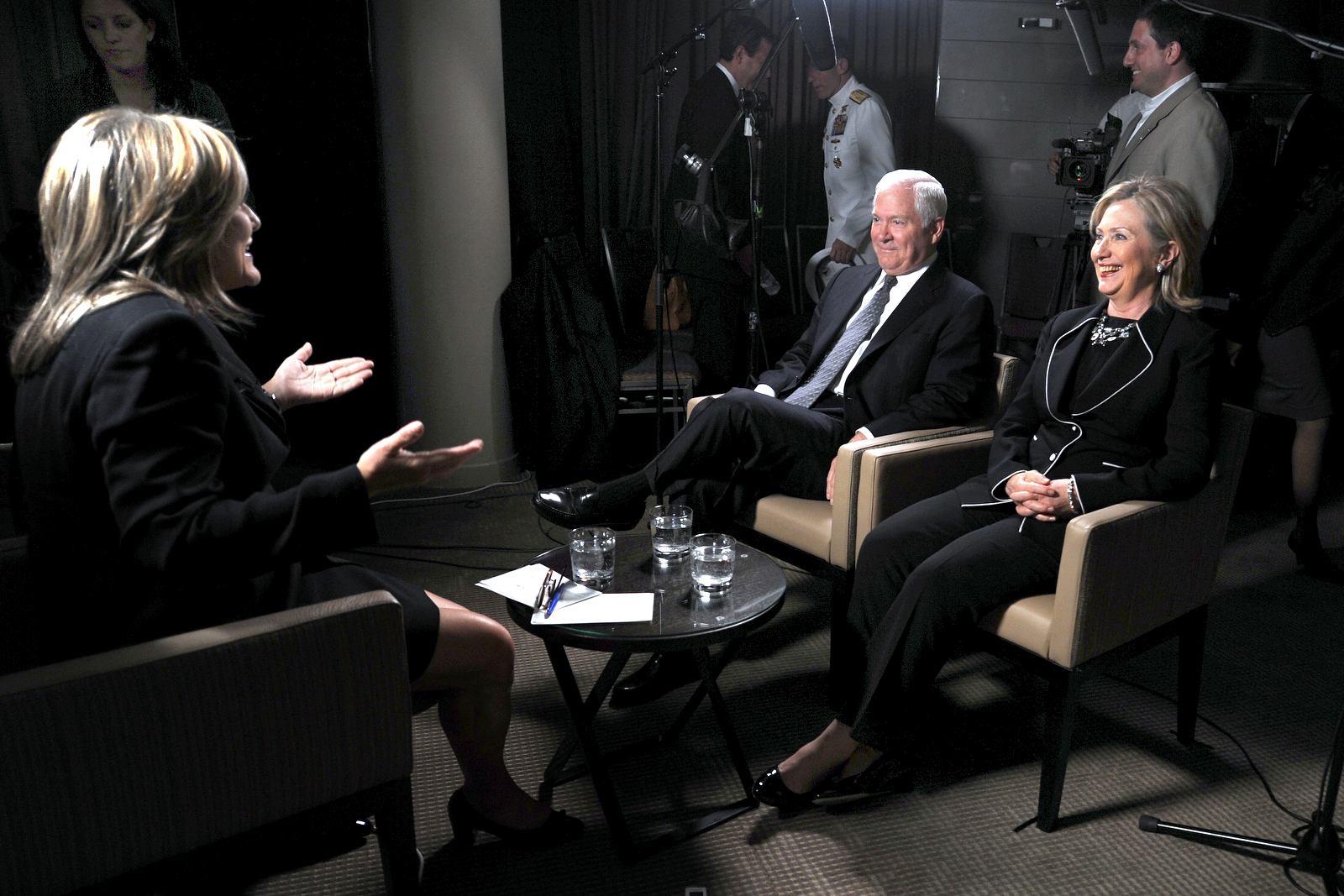
- McFadden (left) interviewing Robert Gates and Hillary Clinton
- Born: May 27, 1956 (age 70); Lewiston, Maine, U.S.
- Education: Bowdoin College (B.A., 1978); Columbia Law School (J.D., 1984)
- Occupation: Television journalist
- Years active: 1984–present
- Notable credit(s): Nightline co-anchor (2005–2014); Primetime co-anchor (2004–2014); ABC News correspondent (1994–2014); NBC News senior legal & investigative correspondent (2014–2024)
- Spouse: John Michael Davies (m. 1989; div. 1996)
- Partner: James F. Hoge, Jr. (1997-1998)
- Children: 1 with Hoge

Cynthia McFadden (born May 27, 1956) is an American television journalist who was the senior legal and investigative correspondent for NBC News. She was an anchor and correspondent for ABC News who co-anchored Nightline, and occasionally appeared on ABC News special Primetime. She was with ABC News from 1994 to 2014 and NBC News from March 2014 to May 2024.

== Biography ==
=== Education ===
Born in Lewiston, Maine, McFadden graduated Phi Beta Kappa and summa cum laude from Bowdoin College in Brunswick, Maine, in 1978. Afterward, she received her Juris Doctor degree from Columbia Law School in New York City in 1984.

=== Career ===
==== Early career and time as ABC News correspondent ====
From 1984 to 1991, McFadden was the executive producer of Fred Friendly's Media and Society seminars based at Columbia, many of which were broadcast on PBS. She then joined the Courtroom Television Network as an anchor and producer in 1991, its inaugural year. After working there for several years, she joined ABC News in 1994 as the network's legal correspondent, covering amongst other subjects the O. J. Simpson trial.

==== Promotion to anchor ====
McFadden became an anchor of Primetime in 2004 and, having previously substituted for Ted Koppel on several occasions, an anchor of Nightline on November 28, 2005, along with Martin Bashir and Terry Moran, following the longtime anchor's final broadcast. Bashir left the program due to fallout from credibility problems from the disputed and controversial reports on singer Michael Jackson and was replaced by Bill Weir in 2010. The three tended to anchor in shifts, leading the show by themselves every third night. While Nightline was threatened with cancellation in 2002 under Koppel's long-form journalism format, it saw a resurgence in its ratings and prominence after switching to more celebrity topics, pop culture and entertainment news, often competing for higher numbers with the Late Show with David Letterman. As anchor, McFadden conducted a number of significant interviews including ones with celebrities such as Clint Eastwood, Paul McCartney and Judge Judy Sheindlin, past and present world leaders such as Pervez Musharraf and Tony Blair, and five with Secretary of State Hillary Clinton

==== Move from ABC to NBC ====
On March 29, 2014, after two decades with ABC News, with the last nine years as a Nightline anchor, McFadden left and joined NBC News. She serves as the senior legal and investigative correspondent, contributing to NBC's investigative unit across all NBC News platforms. She filed her last report on May 22, 2024, on the "NBC Nightly News with Lester Holt" program.

==== Other work ====
McFadden is a contributor for wowOwow.com, a web site launched in 2008 for women to discuss culture, politics and gossip. She has additionally hosted or co-hosted a number of documentaries and specials on ABC.

She is co-chair of the board of IWMF (International Women's Media Foundation).

=== Personal life ===
McFadden married Michael John Davies, editor and publisher of the Hartford Courant, on September 9, 1989; they were divorced in 1996. She has a son with Foreign Affairs editor James Hoge, Spencer Graham McFadden Hoge, who was born in 1998 and named after the actor Spencer Tracy.

She is the executor of the estate of longtime friend actress Katharine Hepburn.

She has Crohn's disease and has done public service announcements to raise awareness of the condition.

McFadden practices Transcendental Meditation and has supported the work of the David Lynch Foundation.

In October 2020, Town and Country magazine published an account McFadden and her son Spencer wrote about their road trip from New York City to California, where he was a student. The account described the accommodations they had to take due to the COVID-19 pandemic. Spencer, having grown up in New York City, had not learned to drive, until he moved to California. McFadden encouraged him to earn a driver's license by promising him a new car.

== Awards ==
- George Foster Peabody Award (1985)
- Cine Golden Eagles (2)
- Ohio State Award
- Silver Gavels (2) from the American Bar Association
- Grand Award of the New York Festival
- Blue Ribbon of the American Film Festival
- Earned an Emmy in 2020
- Gerald Loeb Award for Video in 2020

Media offices
Preceded by Ted Koppel	Nightline anchor November 28, 2005 – March 2014; With Martin Bashir and Terry Moran	Succeeded by Juju Chang
