= Martin Bashir =

British journalist (born 1963)

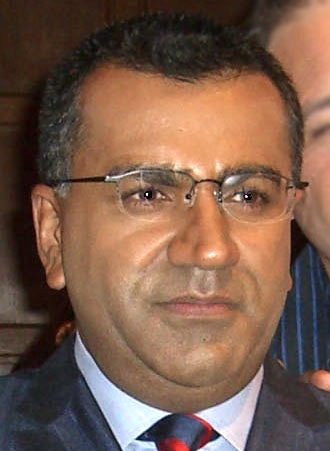
- Bashir in 2007
- Born: 19 January 1963 (age 63); London, England
- Education: King Alfred's College of Higher Education; King's College London
- Occupations: Journalist; news anchor; musician
- Years active: 1986–2021
- Notable credits: "An Interview with HRH The Princess of Wales"; Living with Michael Jackson
- Spouse: Deborah Bashir
- Children: 3
- Musical career
- Genre: Reggae
- Instruments: Vocals; bass guitar

Martin Henry Bashir (born 19 January 1963) is a British journalist and television presenter who has worked for the BBC, ITV, ABC News, and MSNBC. He was a presenter on British and American television and for the BBC's Panorama programme, for which he gained an interview with Diana, Princess of Wales under false pretences in 1995. Although the interview was much heralded at the time, it was later determined that he used forgery and deception to secure it.

Bashir worked for the BBC from 1986 to 1999 on programmes including Panorama before joining ITV. He presented the 2003 ITV documentary about Michael Jackson. In 2004, Bashir joined ABC News, where he became a co-anchor of Nightline. He moved to MSNBC in 2010 and also worked as a correspondent for NBC's Dateline NBC. He resigned from MSNBC on 4 December 2013 after making offensive on-air remarks about Sarah Palin, for which he apologised. In 2016, he returned to the BBC as a religious affairs correspondent.

In 2020, the BBC's director general Tim Davie apologised to the princess's brother, Charles Spencer, 9th Earl Spencer, for Bashir's use of faked bank statements to secure his 1995 Panorama interview with her. Former Justice of the Supreme Court Lord Dyson conducted an independent inquiry and concluded that Bashir had commissioned fake statements to deceive Earl Spencer to gain access to Diana, and in so doing had "acted inappropriately and in serious breach of the 1993 edition of the Producers' Guidelines on straight dealing." Bashir resigned from the BBC in May 2021, citing health reasons.

== Early life and education ==
Bashir was born and raised in Wandsworth, London, to Muslim parents from Pakistan; his father served in the Royal Navy during World War II. Bashir was educated at the boys' state comprehensive Wandsworth School, King Alfred's College of Higher Education, Winchester, studying English and History from 1982 to 1985 (at the time, degrees at King Alfred's were approved by the Council for National Academic Awards), and at King's College London, where he completed a master's degree in theology. Bashir embraced Christianity in his late teens.

Bashir was one of five children, one of whom suffered from muscular dystrophy and died in 1991. Bashir attributed his decisions in life to his late brother, including his appearance on The X Factor: Celebrity. Bashir said in 2019, "Every time I have faced a challenge I have heard him whispering saying, 'What excuse do you have? You have no excuse.'"

== Career ==
=== BBC and ITV ===
Bashir was a freelance sports journalist before joining the BBC in 1986. He worked for the BBC until 1999, on programmes including Songs of Praise, Public Eye and Panorama. For Panorama, he interviewed Diana, Princess of Wales in a 1995 edition.

In 1999 he joined ITV, working on special documentary programmes and features for Tonight with Trevor McDonald.

=== ABC ===
In 2004, Bashir moved to New York, where he worked for ABC, co-anchoring their current affairs show Nightline; along with Cynthia McFadden and Terry Moran, he took over Nightline from Ted Koppel in 2005.

In 2008, while working as a reporter for Nightline, Bashir was suspended from ABC News after making remarks in a speech at the Asian American Journalists Association convention in Chicago that were described as "crude and sexist". He said, "I'm happy to be in the midst of so many Asian babes. I'm happy that the podium covers me from the waist down." He continued and said a speech should be "like a dress on a beautiful woman – long enough to cover the important parts and short enough to keep your interest – like my colleague Juju's", referring to his ABC News colleague Juju Chang, a reporter for 20/20. ABC News suspended him. He wrote an apology to the journalists association which stated, "Upon reflection, it was a tasteless remark that I now bitterly regret. I … hope that the continuing work of the organization will not be harmed or undermined by my moment of stupidity."

=== MSNBC ===
In August 2010, Bashir left ABC for MSNBC, where he served as a political commentator and occasional substitute host for Lawrence O'Donnell, hosted his own programme, Martin Bashir, and was a correspondent for NBC's Dateline NBC.

In January 2013, Bashir was criticised for misleading viewers by airing an edited clip of Neil Heslin, whose son was killed at the Sandy Hook Elementary School shooting, testifying in court. Heslin asked his audience if there was one person in the room who could provide a reason why carrying an assault weapon was necessary: 'Heslin paused for five seconds and looked around him. No one else spoke. "Not one person can answer that question," he said. Then, someone in the audience shouted: "The Second Amendment shall not be infringed."' Bashir's edited companion footage included neither Heslin's interrogation of the audience nor the period of silence, allowing Bashir to describe the clip as "a father's grief interrupted by the cries of a heckler." The edited footage also omitted Heslin's remarks on respecting different opinions. MSNBC later aired an unedited video of the testimony, inviting viewers to decide for themselves whether the response to Heslin's challenge was "heckling" or not.

On 15 November 2013, Bashir criticised Sarah Palin for comments that she made comparing the U.S. federal debt to slavery. Bashir attempted to counter Palin's comparison by referencing the punishment of slaves described by slave overseer Thomas Thistlewood, specifically a punishment called "Derby's dose", and concluded by saying "if anyone truly qualified for a dose of discipline from Thomas Thistlewood, she would be the outstanding candidate". On 18 November, he apologised, stating among other things: "My words were wholly unacceptable. They were neither accurate, nor fair. They were unworthy of anyone who would claim to have an interest in politics." On 4 December 2013, Bashir announced his resignation from MSNBC after meeting the network's president, Phil Griffin. He said that, following further reflection, he had decided to resign and expressed regret for his remarks.

=== BBC religious affairs correspondent ===
In late 2016, Bashir returned to BBC News as religious affairs correspondent, succeeding Caroline Wyatt in the post. He left the BBC on 14 May 2021 after a period of ill health and shortly before the publication of a report from an inquiry into his 1995 interview with Diana, Princess of Wales.

== Interviews ==
=== Princess of Wales ===
In November 1995, Bashir interviewed Diana, Princess of Wales about her failed marriage to the Prince of Wales for the BBC's Panorama programme. The programme was seen by nearly 23 million viewers in the UK. At the time, the BBC hailed it as the scoop of a generation. The interview was an international sensation, and catapulted Bashir, a little-known reporter for a BBC investigative programme, to global fame.

Five months later, two reporters for the Mail On Sunday broke the story that Bashir had secured the interview using falsified documents to manipulate the princess's family. The reporters, Nick Fielding and Jason Lewis, wrote that Bashir approached Diana's brother the Earl Spencer with bank statements which he said were proof that Spencer's former head of security, Alan Waller, secretly received money from a tabloid newspaper, presumably to spy on Spencer and his family.

A BBC freelance graphic designer named Matt Wiessler told the Mail on Sunday that he had created the bank statements in about nine hours on Bashir's orders, and Bashir had used them to win the trust of the Spencer family and connect, through Charles Spencer, to Diana. Wiessler said he was told the documents would be used as filming props. When he began to suspect they were used to deceive the Spencers, he spoke to Fielding and Lewis.

The article, which called Bashir's deception "an extraordinary breach of BBC journalistic ethics," prompted the BBC to announce an internal investigation headed by BBC news chief Tony Hall. Hall interviewed neither Wiessler nor Spencer himself, and the BBC quickly announced that it was clearing Bashir of all wrongdoing because the fake documents—which it did not deny had been created—were not used to secure the interview.

According to internal BBC documents that came to light later, Hall said that Bashir was "an honest man" who was "deeply remorseful". By contrast, he punished Wiessler by cancelling the designer's contract with the BBC. Hall later became the BBC's director-general.

In 2020, 25 years after the famous interview, ITV aired a documentary about the case examining Bashir's manipulations and the BBC's response. In the programme, Wiessler said that work dried up for him after the 1996 inquiry cleared Bashir, and that he (Wiessler) had been made the scapegoat.

The documentary reignited the controversy, and BBC director-general Tim Davie apologised to Earl Spencer, who rejected the apology and demanded an inquiry. "I knew that Martin Bashir used fake bank statements and other dishonesty to get my sister to do the interview," he said, adding that the BBC had not only known of Bashir's manipulation, but had "covered it up." Spencer told Davie he had records of all his contacts with Bashir which apparently implied the journalist gave the princess false information to gain her trust. He said that Bashir made false and defamatory claims about senior members of the royal family and, were it not for the faked documents, he would not have introduced Bashir to his sister. Davie announced on 9 November that the BBC was commissioning an independent inquiry. Michael Grade, a former BBC chairman, said that the allegations left "a very dark cloud hanging over BBC journalism".

At the time of the revelations, Bashir was seriously ill, which the BBC said had required a full investigation to be postponed.

On 13 November 2020, it was reported that the BBC had found the note from the Princess of Wales which cleared Bashir of pressuring her to give the interview. Former BBC royal correspondent Jennie Bond wrote in The Sunday Times that the princess told Bond, in a private meeting in late 1996, that she did not regret the interview. Diana said she feared a gagging order in her imminent divorce settlement, and that the interview might be her only chance to speak openly.

On 18 November 2020, the BBC announced an independent investigation into how the interview was obtained, to be headed by former Supreme Court judge John Dyson.

On 4 March 2021, the Metropolitan Police announced that they would not begin a criminal investigation into the allegations after a "detailed assessment" and consultation with the Metropolitan police lawyers, independent counsel and the Crown Prosecution Service. Later that month Bashir told the BBC inquiry that he was not responsible for spreading smears about the royal family to convince the princess to sit for the interview, and it was probably Diana herself who was the source of those claims. Among the smears were allegations of Prince Edward being treated for AIDS, the Queen suffering from cardiac problems and her intention to abdicate, and that the Prince of Wales was having an affair with his children's nanny, Tiggy Legge-Bourke. Bashir argued that bringing up such allegations in front of Diana would have exposed him as a "complete fantasist" and narrowed down the chance of doing any interviews with her. He added that Diana had revealed to him that she spoke with mystics and clairvoyants, who could have been sources of the false information she received.

On 20 May 2021, the independent inquiry led by Lord Dyson concluded that Bashir had used deception to obtain the interview. It found that he had shown forged bank statements to Earl Spencer to gain his confidence and secure an introduction to Diana. The inquiry also criticised the BBC's handling of its 1996 investigation. After the conclusion of the inquiry, with which the BBC said that Bashir had co-operated fully, a broadcast of Panorama dedicated to the interview and the inquiry was scheduled for 17 May 2021, but was postponed when Bashir resigned.

The Metropolitan Police stated: "Following the publication of Lord Dyson's report we will assess its contents to ensure there is no significant new evidence." In September 2021, they announced that they would not launch a criminal investigation into the interview.

In July 2022 the BBC apologised to the ex-nanny in the High Court, and agreed to pay an undisclosed amount of damages, thought to be in the region of £200,000, over the unfounded claims that she had had an affair with the Prince of Wales.

In December 2023, a judge ordered the BBC to release further emails about its handling of the 2020 interview controversy, following a freedom of information request by journalist Andy Webb. The judge criticised the BBC's handling of the request, and the corporation acknowledged mistakes. In January 2024, the BBC released approximately 3,000 emails, with extensive redactions. Webb said the material showed that important internal evidence had been withheld; the BBC denied acting in bad faith and said it had provided all relevant documentation in its possession to the Dyson inquiry.

A book on the Panorama interview alleged that Bashir had showed Earl Spencer bank statements suggesting that some close to his sister were in the pay of MI5; these documents were forged but proved critical in Diana agreeing to be interviewed by the "charming" and "ruthless" Bashir.

=== Michael Jackson ===
In 2003, while working at ITV, Bashir conducted a series of interviews with American singer Michael Jackson for the documentary Living with Michael Jackson, part of the Tonight with Trevor McDonald series for ITV. The interviews were arranged through Jackson's friend, Uri Geller. Bashir followed the singer for eight months. However, Bashir's colleagues have claimed that he secured the Jackson interview only after promising him they would plan a trip for Jackson to Africa to visit children with AIDS, accompanied by Kofi Annan, then UN Secretary-General; when this was put to Bashir, while under oath in a California court, he refused to answer.

After the broadcast, which was seen by 14 million in the UK and 38 million in the US, Jackson complained to the Independent Television Commission and the Broadcasting Standards Commission, accusing Bashir of yellow journalism. Jackson and his personal cameraman released a rebuttal interview, which showed Bashir complimenting Jackson for the "spiritual" quality of the Neverland Ranch. After Jackson's death in 2009, Dieter Wiesner, Jackson's manager from 1996 to 2003, said of Jackson's response to Bashir's documentary:

It broke him. It killed him. He took a long time to die, but it started that night. Previously the drugs were a crutch, but after that they became a necessity.

Bashir later said during ABC's coverage of Jackson's death:

I think it's worth remembering he was probably, singly, the greatest dancer and musician the world has ever seen. Certainly, when I made the documentary, there was a small part of that which contained a controversy concerning his relationship with other young people. But the truth is that he was never convicted of any crime, I never saw any wrongdoing myself and whilst his lifestyle may have been a bit unorthodox, I don't believe it was criminal and I think the world has now lost the greatest entertainer it's probably ever known.

=== Other interviews and programmes ===
In 2003, Bashir presented a documentary titled Major Fraud detailing the story of British Army major Charles Ingram, who attempted to cheat his way to the prize money in an unbroadcast episode of Who Wants To Be a Millionaire?. The original programme featuring Ingram, recorded in September 2001, was withheld from broadcast because the production team quickly became suspicious. The documentary had a larger audience than Bashir's interview with Michael Jackson.

In December 2004, Bashir interviewed Victor Conte, the controversial founder of BALCO, on ABC's 20/20 programme, in which Conte admitted to running doping programmes involved in breaking Olympic records, and in which Conte claimed: "The whole history of the games is just full of corruption, cover-up, performance-enhancing drug use."

Bashir also conducted interviews with public figures including Louise Woodward, the five suspects in the Stephen Lawrence case, Michael Barrymore, Jeffrey Archer, Joanne Lees, and George Best.

== Honours ==
Bashir and producer Mike Robinson received the BAFTA Award for Best Talk Show at the 1996 British Academy Television Awards for their work on the interview with Diana for Panorama. Bashir also won the Factual or Science Based Programme of the Year from the Television and Radio Industries Club, TV Journalist of the Year from the Broadcasting Press Guild, and Journalist of the Year from the Royal Television Society for the Diana interview.

In May 2021, following publication of the Dyson report, the BBC announced that it would return the awards received for the interview, including the 1996 BAFTA for Best Talk Show. The corporation said it was not appropriate to retain the awards because of the methods used to obtain the interview.

== Other activities ==
Bashir had a role as himself in the 2001 satirical comedy film Mike Bassett: England Manager.

He plays the bass guitar. He released a reggae album, Bass Lion, on 26 October 2010.

== Portrayal ==
Bashir has been portrayed by Prasanna Puwanarajah in both Diana and The Crown.

== Personal life ==
Bashir is fluent in Urdu. He converted from Islam to Christianity in his late teens after attending a church in south London, and identifies as a committed Christian, having been interested in Christianity as a child. While in New York he sometimes visits Redeemer Presbyterian Church.

He and his wife, Deborah, have three children. In 2008, he was diagnosed with a brain tumour affecting his pituitary gland, was reported to be "seriously unwell" with the coronavirus in October 2020, and reportedly underwent quadruple heart bypass surgery in late 2020 and further surgical procedures in spring 2021.

Preceded by Ted Koppel	Nightline anchor 28 November 2005 – 6 August 2010; With Terry Moran and Cynthia McFadden	Succeeded by Bill Weir; With Terry Moran and Cynthia McFadden
