= The Wonder List with Bill Weir =

American television series on CNN

- Created by: Bill Weir, Conor Hanna
- Presented by: Bill Weir
- Country of origin: United States
- No. of seasons: 4
- No. of episodes: 25

Production
- Cinematography: Philip Bloom (Seasons 1 & 2); Joe Simon (Season 3)
- Running time: 60 minutes

Original release
- Network: CNN; CNN+
- Release: March 1, 2015 – April 21, 2022

The Wonder List with Bill Weir is a CNN original documentary television series hosted by American journalist Bill Weir. The series debut was on March 1, 2015, with the first episode on Vanuatu. CNN announced that it had commissioned a second series in shortly after the first series aired. The third season aired on October 7, 2017. The four episodes of the fourth season were released on CNN+ on April 21, 2022, just hours before it was announced the streaming service would be shut down the following week.

The series entails Bill Weir telling the stories of people, places and cultures at a crossroads.

== Episodes ==
Season	Episodes	Originally released	
Season	Episodes	First released	Last released
1	8	March 1, 2015	April 12, 2015
2	7	April 15, 2016	December 18, 2016
3	6	October 7, 2017	November 11, 2017
4	4	April 21, 2022	

=== Season 1 (2015) ===
No. overall	No. in season	Title	Original release date	US viewers (millions)
1	1	"Vanuatu: Landlords of Paradise"	March 1, 2015	N/A
Environmental forces that are changing parts of the world are examined. The opener features a visit to Vanuatu, where native tribes confront factors that threaten the traditions of an ancient people.
2	2	"Galapagos: A Fight for Survival"	March 8, 2015	N/A
A visit to the Galapagos Islands where naturalists fight to keep the natural habitat in balance and save endangered species from extinction.
3	3	"Ikaria: The Island Where People Forget to Die"	March 15, 2015	N/A
A visit to the remote Greek island of Ikaria where inhabitants live longer than most Americans and try to maintain their centuries old way of life in a modern world.
4	4	"India: Tigers and the Taj"	March 22, 2015	N/A
Weir visits the Taj Mahal in India and learns about conservation efforts to save the Bengal tiger.
5	5	"The Dead Sea: Salt of the Earth"	March 29, 2015	N/A
The fight to save the Dead Sea from drying up in Jordan and Israel due to border conflicts is examined.
6	6	"Venice: Sink or Swim"	April 5, 2015	N/A
A journey through the canals of Venice, where rising sea levels threaten the future of the historic city.
7	7	"Everglades: A Fight for Glory"	April 5, 2015	N/A
A visit to Florida's endangered Everglades.
8	8	"The Alps: Fire and Ice"	April 12, 2015	N/A
A visit to the Alps where glaciers are receding to examine what the stakes are if the melting continues.

=== Season 2 (2016) ===
No. overall	No. in season	Title	Original release date	US viewers (millions)
9	1	"Cuba: Forbidden Island"	March 20, 2016	N/A
Season 2 begins with a visit to Cuba where people are preparing for a tourist invasion.
10	2	"Iceland: The Wedding Crash"	March 27, 2016	N/A
A visit to Iceland, where two-thirds of babies are born to unmarried parents, to explore whether the nation will be the first country to completely let go of marriage.
11	3	"The Colorado River: A Thirst for More"	April 3, 2016	N/A
An examination of the Colorado River that sustains more than 40 million people in the West to see whether enough efforts are being made to see that it continues to flow, with populations booming and the waters receding.
12	4	"Bhutan: The Happiest Place On Earth"	April 10, 2016	N/A
The magical kingdom of Bhutan, "the happiest place on earth," is visited to see whether it can stay blissfully content as the modern world encroaches its borders.
13	5	"Botswana: The Hunters & the Hunted"	April 17, 2016	0.45
Weir goes on safari in Africa with naturalists fighting to save precious species from extinction.
14	6	"Peru"	December 11, 2016	N/A
Weir explores Peru.
15	7	"The Future of Freedom"	December 18, 2016	0.43
Bill Weir travels to Amsterdam, famed as one of the world's most liberal cities, to find out if this bastion of tolerance can stay that way amid a rising tide of intolerance.

=== Season 3 (2017) ===
No. overall	No. in season	Title	Original release date	US viewers (millions)
16	1	"Patagonia: Paradise Bought"	October 7, 2017	0.615
A report on late American conservationist Douglas Tompkins who purchased vast tracts of land in Patagonia, much to the dismay of local developers.
17	2	"Madagascar: The Richest Poor Country in the World"	October 14, 2017	N/A
A visit to Madagascar where deforestation rages and unique species vanish, and where a fight is brewing to save one of the planet's most special places before it is ruined forever.
18	3	"Egypt: Sunken City of Pharaohs"	October 21, 2017	N/A
Weir explores Egypt.
19	4	"Alaska: Buried Treasure"	October 28, 2017	N/A
Miners want to drill for billions of dollars' worth of copper and gold beneath the pristine wilderness of America's last wild frontier but fishermen say the world's last great salmon run could be jeopardized.
20	5	"New Zealand: Preying on the Predators"	November 4, 2017	N/A
A look at predatory mammals in New Zealand.
21	6	"Peru: The Curse of Incan Gold"	November 11, 2017	N/A
A look at whether the fragile beauty of the Incan ruins of Machu Picchu can be protected from an ever-growing number of visitors.
