= Martin Bashir (TV program) =

MSNBC television series (2011–2013)

- Presented by: Martin Bashir
- Country of origin: United States

Production
- Production location: New York City
- Running time: 60 minutes

Original release
- Network: MSNBC
- Release: February 28, 2011 – November 22, 2013

Martin Bashir is an American hour-long weekday U.S. and world political commentary program hosted by Martin Bashir. The program aired live at 4:00 p.m. ET on MSNBC. It premiered on February 28, 2011, moving MSNBC Live with Thomas Roberts to 11:00 a.m. ET. It aired from a small customized studio that is actually part of Studio 3A, the primary MSNBC newsroom and studio at 30 Rock, and ended on November 22, 2013.

== Show content ==
The program was often a mix of news and opinion content, serving as a lead-in to the network's prime time opinion programming. Bashir gave his thoughts on issues of the day along with a panel of guests and relevant interviews pertaining to specific issues being covered. Bashir presented with a liberal left point of view, consistent with the MSNBC network.

== Broadcast history ==
The program originally aired in the 3 p.m. slot, but moved forward one hour on June 25, 2012, replacing The Dylan Ratigan Show. The Cycle, a new multi-host program, launched in the 3 p.m. hour the same day.

The show ended after its November 22, 2013 episode due to controversial comments Bashir made about the former governor of Alaska and then vice presidential candidate Sarah Palin the previous week, going on an already-planned Thanksgiving break. On December 4, 2013, Bashir resigned from his position at MSNBC after what were described by The New York Times as "ill-judged comments" about Palin.

== Segments ==
- Play of the Day - A viral video was shown.
- Top Lines - Various soundbites featuring things said by politicians and comedians were highlighted.
- Here's the Story - Only featured during the 2012 Republican presidential campaign, a segment featuring discussion on the nominees.
- Clear the Air - Martin got his thoughts on a news story of the day.

Preceded by The Cycle	MSNBC Weekday Lineup; 4:00 PM-5:00 PM	Succeeded by The Ed Show
