= Living with Michael Jackson =

2003 British television documentary film

- Genre: Documentary
- Directed by: Julie Shaw
- Presented by: Martin Bashir
- Starring: Michael Jackson
- Country of origin: United Kingdom

Production
- Executive producer: Jeff Anderson
- Producers: James Goldston; Julie Shaw
- Running time: 110 minutes
- Production company: Granada Television

Original release
- Network: ITV1
- Release: 3 February 2003

Living with Michael Jackson is a 2003 British television documentary film in which journalist Martin Bashir interviewed American singer Michael Jackson from May 2002 to January 2003. It was broadcast in the United Kingdom on ITV (as a Tonight with Trevor McDonald special) on 3 February 2003, and in the United States three days later on ABC, introduced by Barbara Walters. Jackson took Bashir on a tour of his home, Neverland Ranch, and discussed his family, unhappy childhood, plastic surgery, and relationships with children.

In November 2003, the BBC aired Louis, Martin & Michael, a documentary by British filmmaker Louis Theroux, who had lost out to Bashir to make the documentary. The following month, following controversy raised from Bashir's documentary, Jackson was charged with seven counts of child molestation and two counts of intoxicating a minor with alcohol, all of which he was acquitted of in a court of law in June 2005.

== Summary ==
Living with Michael Jackson begins at Neverland Ranch, where Jackson and Martin Bashir tour the estate's grounds and face off in a go-kart race. Jackson explains that he writes his songs by composing lyrics and not the music, because the music "will write itself". While watching archival footage of the Jackson 5, Jackson recalls painful memories of abusive treatment at the hands of his father Joe, and explains that this is why he never laid a hand on his children.

At the Four Seasons Hotel in Las Vegas, Jackson speaks about his love life, his changing physical appearance and his children. Bashir meets Jackson's children, Prince and Paris, who wear masks to conceal their appearance. Jackson then goes to Berlin, where the "baby dangling" incident occurs. Jackson visits the Berlin Zoo and a charity auction and receives a humanitarian award at the Bambi Awards.

Back at Neverland Ranch, Gavin Arvizo is interviewed and states that it was Jackson's support that helped him beat his bout with cancer. Jackson admits that sometimes, when Gavin stayed with him, the singer let him sleep in his bed while he slept on the floor. When asked what he gets out of his involvement with children, Jackson replies that he gains joy, because "my greatest inspiration comes from kids".

During January 2003, Bashir meets with Jackson in Miami for the final interview and brings up the subject of his face. A visibly upset Jackson says that he has only had two operations on his nose in order to facilitate his singing. Bashir concludes that Jackson wanted to change his appearance as a result of his troubled youth. He repeatedly questions Jackson about why he allows children into his room. Jackson defends himself stating that such activity is natural when the children are of close friends or family, and that "many children", including Macaulay and Kieran Culkin, have slept in the same bed as him. Jackson strongly denies any sexual motivation for this.

== Reception ==
Following the documentary's transmission, Jackson felt betrayed by Bashir and complained that the film gave a distorted picture of his behaviour and conduct as a father. He said that in the final version of his interview, Bashir used only material that supported the negative view Bashir was portrayed as holding towards Jackson. In response, Jackson and his personal cameraman released a rebuttal interview, which showed Bashir complimenting Jackson on his abilities as a father and his grace under pressure.

"I haven't seen that documentary," remarked the American singer Madonna, "but it sounds disgusting, like Bashir exploited a friendship. Publicly humiliating someone for your own gain will only come back to haunt you. I can assure you, all these people will be sorry. God's going to have his revenge."

Noel Gallagher, the guitarist for Oasis, slammed the documentary as "typical British journalism". In an interview with Ian Dempsey on Today FM, he said: "I was quite annoyed at the fact that one of the biggest stars that ever was or ever will be, they managed to get access to him for how many months and there was an hour and half programme on him and they mentioned his music and his art for maybe two or three minutes. Did you learn anything new about Michael Jackson that you didn't already know? He's off his nut, he's got a huge house, he's got a lot of money, we all knew that anyway. I would rather have had an hour and a half programme telling me how he wrote the album Off the Wall and the one after that." Coming to Jackson's defence, Gallagher said: "I mean, so what if he climbs trees? Any man that has got a fairground in his backgarden and can say to a child, 'I'm going to build a water park behind that mountain,' give him a round of applause. He seems like a very passionate and caring father, so let's not tear him up."

Bashir stated: "I don't believe that I've betrayed Michael Jackson at all. I agreed that we would make an honest film about his life. The film was fair to his musical achievement and gave him every opportunity to explain himself. I'm not accusing anybody of being a child molester or a paedophile." Bashir was the first witness for the prosecution in Jackson's child molestation trial. He refused to answer questions from defense attorneys. Following Jackson's death in 2009, Bashir said Jackson "was never convicted of any crime, and I never saw any wrongdoing myself, and while his lifestyle may have been a bit unorthodox, I don't believe he was a criminal."

In 2021, Jackson's UK publicist, Mark Borkowski, stated that he had discouraged him from giving an interview to Bashir. That same year, many Jackson fans demanded an investigation to examine the circumstances surrounding the documentary after it was revealed that Bashir, as a reporter for the BBC's Panorama, had used forged documents to secure his interview with Diana, Princess of Wales in 1995. Jackson's family also reacted by criticizing Bashir for hoodwinking him and manipulating the footage, and stated that they were considering legal action.

=== Rebuttal video ===
In an attempt to repair his image, Jackson released a rebuttal interview, The Michael Jackson Interview: The Footage You Were Never Meant To See, broadcast on Fox in the US. Despite NBC reportedly bidding US$5 million for the footage, Jackson sold the footage to Fox for £1.6 million. The interview was aired on Sky One in the UK.

Presented by Maury Povich, the special contains material which Bashir omitted. It also features new interviews with people close to Jackson, such as his former wife Debbie Rowe, parents Joe and Katherine Jackson, brother Jermaine and close friend Elizabeth Taylor. In this interview, Rowe claimed it was at her request that the children wore masks in public. She also pointed out that the concept of "sharing a bed" can be misunderstood: for example, she herself likes watching television in bed; when she has a visitor, they both watch television together in bed. It also contains interviews with Bashir giving very different opinions to those he had given in interviews and in his original voice-over narration. He is shown praising Jackson as a father as well as saying that he thinks it is wonderful that he allows children to come to Neverland, though he had made previous statements that Neverland Ranch was a "dangerous place" for children (a direct contradiction of his later statement that he did not believe Jackson was a criminal).

The footage shown in the rebuttal documentary was privately filmed by Hamid Moslehi, who stated that he was not "secretly" videotaping the interviews as was popularly believed. Moslehi said Bashir knew they were also filming, but that Bashir probably did not know that when he told his camera crew to cut, that he was still filming. Part of the footage was not aired because Moslehi refused to hand it over, owing to a financial dispute with Jackson. It was found by police in a search of Moslehi's home in November 2003, and showed the accuser's family praising Jackson.

Fourteen million people watched the Jackson rebuttal documentary. The program's UK debut on Sky One drew more than two million viewers, making it the third-biggest show in the channel's history.

=== Ratings ===
The programme was broadcast on ITV in the United Kingdom and watched by 15 million viewers, while 38 million watched the 2-hour special on ABC in the United States.

=== In popular culture ===
On 14 March 2003, the BBC produced a special spoof parody of the documentary, entitled "Lying to Michael Jackson." The sketch showed Jackson, played by comedian Lenny Henry, being interviewed and followed around for the documentary by Bashir, played by Rowan Atkinson. The miniseries was also parodied in the British sketch comedy series Bo Selecta.

Preceded by Tonight with Trevor McDonald	RTS: Television Journalism; Programme of the Year; 2004	Succeeded by Home: Panorama – A Fight to the Death; International: This World – Access to Evil
