= Juju Chang =

American journalist and news anchor (born 1965)

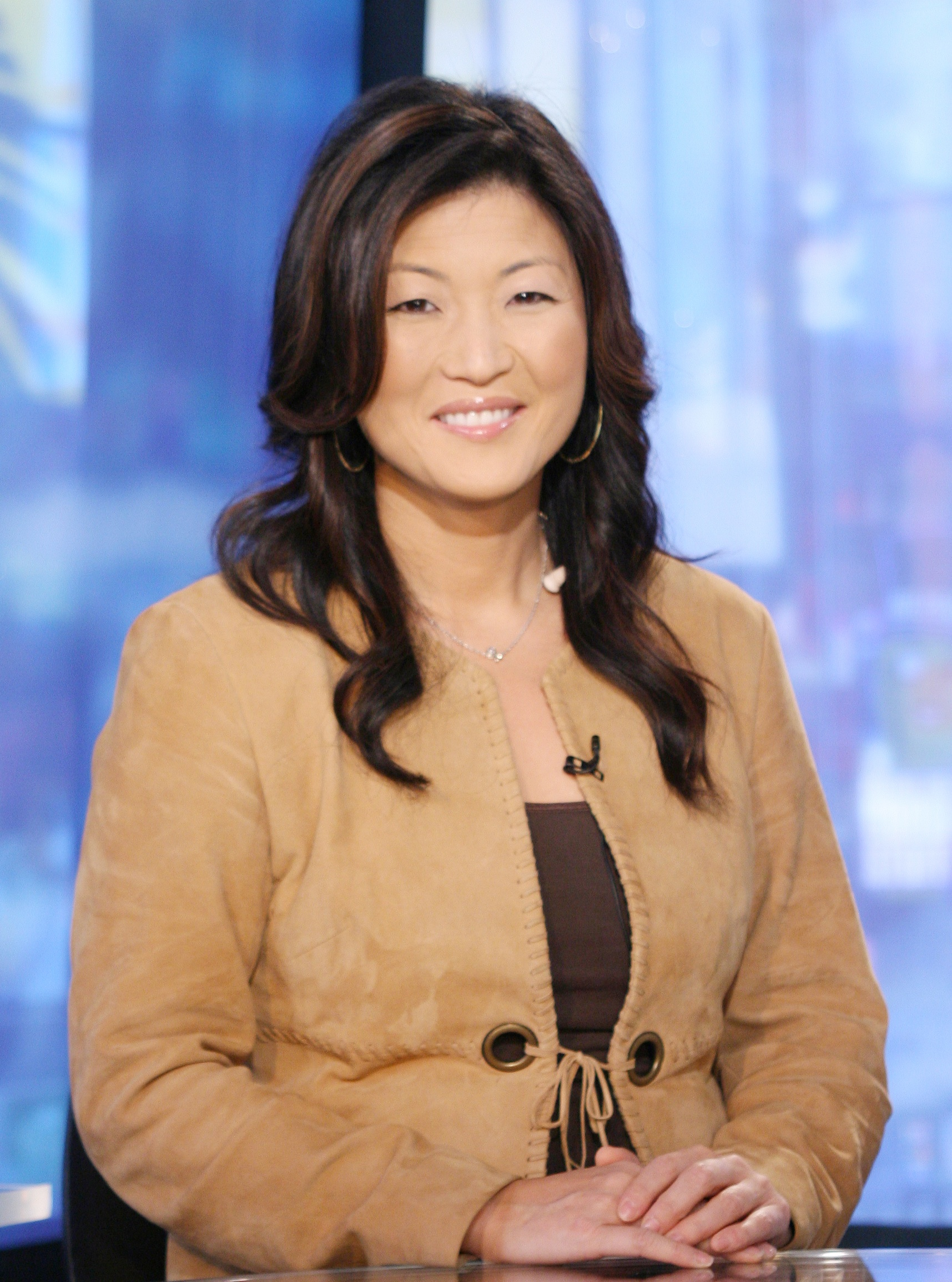
- Chang in 2007
- Born: Chang Hyun-ju; September 17, 1965 (age 61); Seoul, South Korea
- Education: Stanford University (BA)
- Occupation: Television journalist
- Years active: 1984–present
- Title: Special correspondent, Nightline
- Spouse: Neal Shapiro (m. 1995)
- Children: 3
- Relatives: Mitch White (nephew)
- Website: Juju Chang biography

Hyunju Chang (born September 17, 1965) is an American television journalist for ABC News and an anchor of Nightline. She has previously worked as a special correspondent and fill-in anchor for Nightline, and was also the news anchor for ABC News' morning news program Good Morning America from 2009 to 2011.

== Early life ==
Juju Chang was born in Seoul, South Korea, to Okyong Chang and Palki Chang and was raised in Sunnyvale, California, following her family’s immigration to the U.S. in 1969. She attended Marian A. Peterson High School for one year, but after that school was converted into a middle school, Chang graduated from Adrian C. Wilcox High School in 1983. At a young age, Chang was a nationally ranked swimmer.

In 1987, she graduated with honors from Stanford University with a Bachelor of Arts in political science and communications. At Stanford, she was awarded the Edwin Cotrell Political Science Prize.

== Career ==
=== Early career ===
Chang began work for ABC in 1984 as a desk assistant. In 1991 she became a producer and off-air reporter for ABC World News Tonight, producing live events coverage and stories for its "American Agenda" segment. Her off-air reporting assignments included the 1991 Gulf War (during which she was based in Dhahran, Saudi Arabia) and the 1992 U.S. presidential election.

For World News Tonight, she produced a series on women's health, which won an Alfred I. duPont–Columbia University Award in 1995. She left World News Tonight in 1995 to become a reporter for KGO-TV, an ABC affiliate, in San Francisco, covering state and local news topics.

=== Return to ABC News ===
After a year at KGO-TV, Chang returned to ABC News in 1996, taking up the role of correspondent for the ABC affiliate news service NewsOne in Washington D.C. At NewsOne she covered the White House, Capitol Hill and the 1996 presidential election.

Returning to World News Tonight in 1998, she covered such stories as Hurricane Georges, the anniversary of the Chernobyl nuclear disaster and the bombings of U.S. embassies in Kenya and Tanzania. Her first news anchor roles came in 1999, when she hosted the early-morning newscasts of ABC News' World News Now, an overnight news program, and World News This Morning where she reported on national and international news.

=== 20/20 and Nightline ===
Chang has contributed many reports to ABC's news magazine 20/20, including a piece on Tanzania's black market for albino body parts in 2009. She has produced reporting on serious news events since moving to GMA, as well as continuing on ABC's Nightline, where she has reported on a broad range of topics including the Heparin tainting case and the in vitro fertilization industry and has acted as host on the show's feature, "Face-Off".

=== Good Morning America ===
Chang became the first Korean American in a prominent role on a U.S. morning news television show when she joined Good Morning America on December 14, 2009. She contributes news stories and segments for the show, in addition to her role as news anchor.

As the news anchor on Good Morning America, Chang reported on the earthquake in Haiti in January 2010. She traveled to Haiti to cover the aftermath of the natural disaster, interviewing locals and finding relatives of a Haitian friend. She later took part in the Housatonic Valley Sprint Triathlon on September 11, 2010, to raise money for UNICEF's relief efforts in Haiti in collaboration with Good Morning America.

For a series of reports airing on Good Morning America from June 25, 2010, Chang traveled to Seoul, South Korea. During her visit to South Korea, she interviewed South Korean President Lee Myung-bak on the relationship between North and South Korea following the sinking of a South Korean warship.

In September 2011, Chang interviewed United Nations Secretary General Ban Ki-moon at the UN Headquarters.

=== Nightline ===
On March 29, 2011, it was announced that Chang would be leaving Good Morning America to take a full-time role on Nightline, ABC News President Ben Sherwood announced. Chang became a special correspondent and fill-in anchor. She had spent the past 15 months as the news reader for GMA as well as contributor to 20/20 and World News, programs she will continue to work with. On March 27, 2014, Chang was named co-anchor of Nightline, replacing Cynthia McFadden, who left ABC to join NBC News.

=== Other works ===
In addition to her roles at ABC, Chang has also hosted a series for PBS. In 1999, she was the host of a seven-part television series called The Art of Women's Health. She hosts an interactive digital show for ABC News NOW called Moms Get Real, which aims to show the realities of modern motherhood, she also made a cameo appearance in episode 19 of the second season of ABC's hit primetime drama, Revenge.

== Awards ==
For her work in television journalism, Chang has received a number of awards. Her earliest journalistic award was an Alfred I. duPont Award in 1995 for a series on women's health produced with Peter Jennings. In addition to the duPont Award, Chang has won two Gracie Awards, one for a report on judicial activism for NOW, a newsmagazine on PBS, and one for Women and Science, a profile of Ben Barres, a transgender neurobiologist, for 20/20. She has won three Emmy awards for her work with ABC, including one for her role as a correspondent on ABC's live coverage of California wildfires in 2008. She has also received a Freddie award (for health and medical media) for The Art of Women's Health, a series she hosted for PBS.

== Personal life ==
Chang married news executive Neal Shapiro on December 2, 1995. At that time, she converted to Judaism. Chang and Shapiro have three sons. She is active in the Asian-American community as a founding board member of the Korean American Community Foundation and an active member of the Council on Foreign Relations. As of 2011, the family lived on the West Side of Manhattan.

In 2015, Chang co-hosted the annual Spring Luncheon held by The New York Society for the Prevention of Cruelty to Children.

Chang is the aunt of former MLB pitcher Mitch White.

== See also ==
- Koreans in the New York metropolitan area
- New Yorkers in journalism
