= Terry Moran =

American journalist (born 1959)

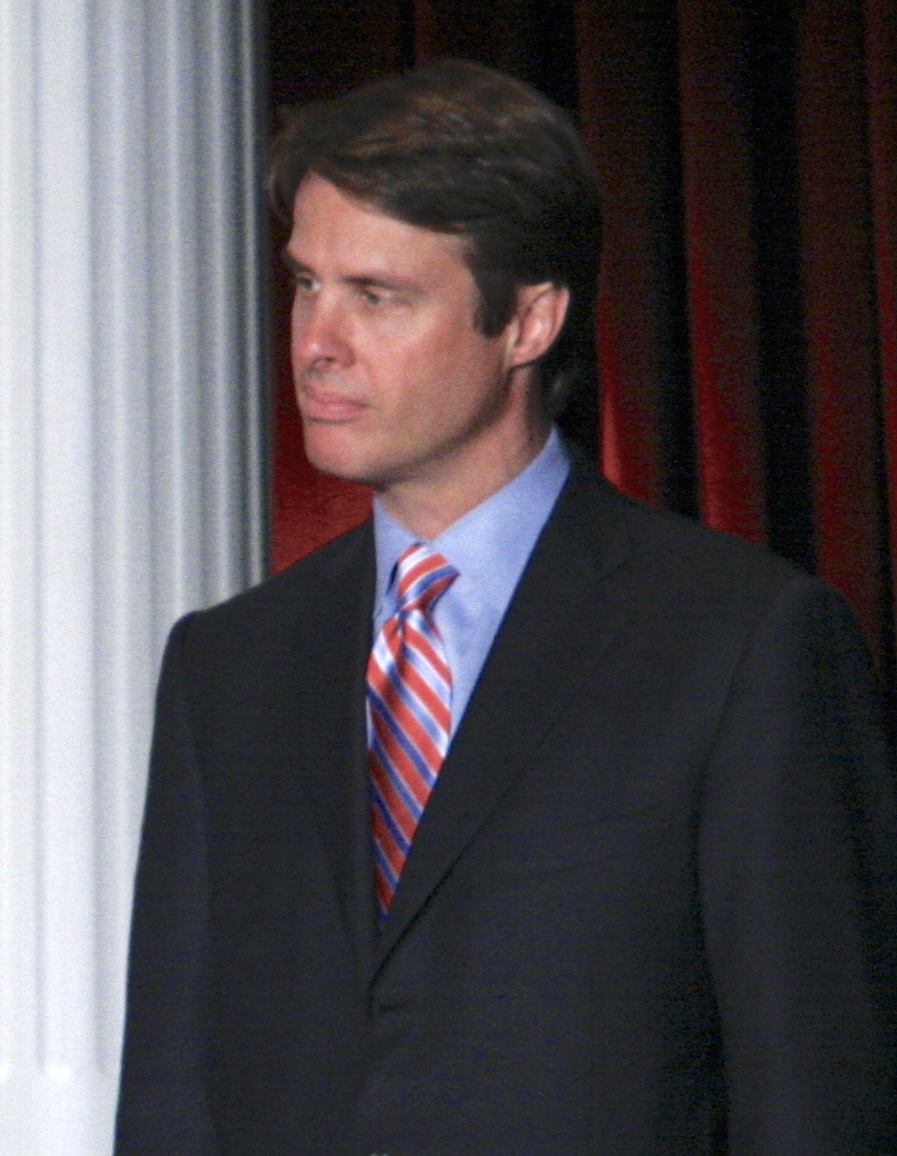
- Terry Moran in 2007
- Born: Terence Patrick Moran; December 9, 1959 (age 66); Chicago, Illinois, U.S.
- Education: Lawrence University (B.A.)
- Occupation: Television journalist
- Years active: 1990–present
- Notable credit(s): ABC News Chief White House Correspondent (1999–2005); Nightline co-anchor (2005–2013); ABC News Chief Foreign Correspondent (2013–2018); Senior National Correspondent (2018–2025)

Terence Patrick Moran (born December 9, 1959) is an American independent journalist who was most recently the Senior National Correspondent at ABC News. Based in Washington, D.C., Moran covered national politics and policy, reporting from the White House, the US Supreme Court, and the campaign trail for all ABC News programs. Previously, Moran served as ABC's Chief Foreign Correspondent from 2013 to 2018, as co-anchor of the ABC News show Nightline from 2005 to 2013, and as Chief White House Correspondent from 1999 to 2005. On June 8, 2025, after Moran made posts critical of Donald Trump and Stephen Miller, Moran was suspended indefinitely by ABC News and was later fired.

== Early life and education ==
Terence Patrick Moran was born on December 9, 1959 in Chicago, Illinois, and grew up in Mount Prospect, Illinois, and Barrington Hills, Illinois. He graduated from Lawrence University in 1982, where he edited the school newspaper, The Lawrentian.

== Career ==
=== Early career ===
Moran began his journalism career at The New Republic magazine and then worked as a reporter and editor at the Washington D.C.–based Legal Times. While at the Legal Times, he wrote an article based on information given to him by David Boaz which Bernard Siegan agreed with Boaz. From 1992 through 1997, Moran worked as a news correspondent and anchor for Court TV. Moran covered the Anita Hill-Clarence Thomas hearings on sexual harassment allegations and a $105 Million jury award against General Motors where a young man died in a GM truck, but was later reversed by a three-judge panel in the Court of Appeals for the Eleventh Circuit. Moran rose to national prominence, covering the trials in Los Angeles of Lyle and Erik Menendez and O. J. Simpson. Moran reported that there was no censorship at the Menendez' trial. Moran reported on the Bosnian war crimes trials at The Hague and the U.S. Supreme Court confirmation hearings for justices Clarence Thomas, Stephen Breyer, and Ruth Bader Ginsburg. Marshall Sella of New York magazine wrote of Moran in May 1995 that he managed to instill into the Simpson case a sense of dignity.

=== ABC News (1997–2025) ===
==== 1997–2005 ====
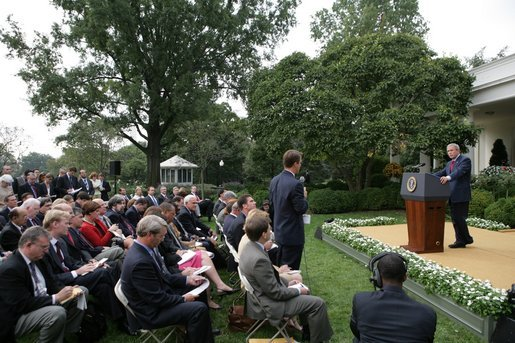
Moran addressing President George W. Bush as an ABC News White House correspondent, October 2005

Moran joined ABC News in 1997 as the Law and Justice Correspondent. Moran served as the primary correspondent assigned to the U.S. Supreme Court from 1998 to 1999. In September 1999, Moran was promoted to weekend White House Correspondent for John Cochran who took over for Sam Donaldson while he had throat surgery. Moran was promoted in December 2000 ABC News' Chief White House Correspondent from December 2000 to January 2001 where he covered the presidency of Bill Clinton. He covered Vice President Al Gore's presidential campaign. While on the campaign trail in buses and planes, Moran reviewed the Lincoln-Douglas debate. In September 2000, Moran reported that Gore spent nine days in Florida making George W. Bush campaign extensively in the state. Moran would cover the presidency of George W. Bush from January 2001 to late November 2005. In March 2001, Moran and Jim Wooten reported on Slobodan Milošević's arrest and the reasons behind it. Milošević was indicted for his role in the Yugoslav Wars on war crimes. In January 2002, Moran claimed he was offended when he overheard two print reporters talking inside the briefing room. In a question and answer press conference, Moran asked President Bush about the Harken Energy scandal. Ari Fleischer, who served as the 23rd White House Press Secretary, for President Bush, from January 2001 to July 2003, told the President that he thought Moran's editors told him to ask the question though he thought of the question himself. One month after the September 11 attacks (9/11), Moran reported from the Pentagon where there was a service for the one hundred eighty-nine dead. Secretary of Defense Donald Rumsfeld and President Bush spoke at the ceremony on ABC World News Tonight with Peter Jennings. Moran mentioned that the President would speak to the nation and the world in a prime time speech. In January 2004, Moran reported on This Week that President Bush campaigned as "a unifier, not a divider" in 2000 where Moran concluded with that Bush failed as that. Moran said Bush was a "divisive president" and "divisive figure". During President Bush's term, he questioned why the President was taking the nation to war on "a series of false pretenses". On November 7, 2005, Moran also asked about two impressions; Saddam Hussein and the Iraqi oil fields which the President said, "Yes. Well. I'm–some people have the right impressions and some people have the wrong impressions." In that same interview, Moran asked about how terrorists would come after Americans for going to war with Hussein and Iraq which he responded, "Well that's like saying we should not be going after Al Qaida because we might irritate somebody, and that would create a danger to Americans. My attitude is, you've got to deal with terrorism in a firm way. And if they see threats, you deal with them in all different kind of ways". John Powers wrote in his book Sore Winners: American Idols, Patriotic Shoppers, and Other Strange Species in George Bush's America that Moran had the guts to suggest that President Bush eluded questions on the world's opposition to war. Moran interviewed Vice President Dick Cheney about surveilling and waterboarding prisoners. In March 2003, Moran reported that the reporters at President Bush's speech on the Invasion of Iraq on the start of the Iraq War that reporters looked "like zombies". In February 2004, Moran spoke with First Lady Laura Bush. She responded to him on Terry McAuliffe's AWOL charge, "I don't think it's really fair to lie about allegations about someone." Moran would ask how she knew President Bush was on Guard Duty in Alabama. First Lady Bush responded, "Because he told me he was." The reelection committee pitched her as the president's secret weapon after the David Kay fiasco. On June 22, 2004, Moran reported on the Iraqi prisoners at Abu Ghraib, Guantanamo Bay, and other lesser known prisons where torture was taking place on ABC World News Tonight with Peter Jennings. In 2004, Moran was named anchor of ABC World News Tonight Sunday. During the 2004 Presidential Election, Moran asked "The question for the Swfit Boat Veterans is, are their charges accurate?" of John Kerry. In May 2005, Moran was interviewed by Hugh Hewitt. Moran said, "There is, I agree with you, a deep anti-military bias in the media, one that begins from the premise that the military must be lying and that American projection of power around the world must be wrong." In June 2005, Moran reported from Fort Bragg on President Bush's speech with Charles Gibson and George Stephanopoulos in New York City.

==== Nightline ====
Moran began in 2005 as co-anchor of Nightline along with Martin Bashir and Cynthia McFadden. Nightline began airing live each night while also switching to three topics a night. Frazier Moore of the Associated Press after Ted Koppel left Nightline said it shifted into full default mode with its three anchors. Moran reported from Baghdad the week of November 28.

In April 2006, Moran said of how Nightline was five months after Koppel left, "I think we're beginning in a way that's convincing our audience that we're going to remain serious." In May 2006, Moran reported on Arlington National Cemetery, Section 60, where members of the fallen in Afghanistan and Iraq are laid to rest. It was Memorial Day. Jack Bryant was interviewed about his son, Jay, who had been killed on November 20, 2004, when his convoy had been attacked. Moran asked, "Weren't you disappointed when he didn't return home?" Bryant answered disingenuously. In reflection, Bryant wished he could have told Moran that he was devastated. In Matt Welch's book, McCain: The Myth of a Maverick, Moran said, "Everywhere he goes, McCain takes on all comers. All questions." In May 2007, Moran and Matt Stuart reported that former Vice president Al Gore was harshly critical of President Bush in his book, The Assault on Reason. In April 2007, Moran wrote a blog item entitled "Don’t Feel Too Sorry for the Dukies." The Duke lacrosse team had forty-six members. Three of them raised $800 for strippers. In Dylan Gwinn's book Bias in the Booth: An Insider Exposes How the Sports Media Distort the News, Gwinn thought Moran and others were wrong about the Duke three. The Duke three were falsely accused of rape by Crystal Mangum. On April 11, 2007, North Carolina Attorney General Roy Cooper dropped all charges and declared the three players innocent. Cooper stated that the charged players were victims of a "tragic rush to accuse." Om September 24, 2007, Moran interviewed Kanye West along with West's mother Donda. In October 2007, he and Rym Momtaz reported on GodTube, the Christian response to YouTube. In January 2008, Moran would interview Vice President Cheney, this time on Nightline, about torture at Guantanamo Bay. In February 2008, Moran said, "The new son of Camelot. Ted and Caroline Kennedy pass the torch to Barack Obama to carry the legacy of JFK". David Wright proclaimed, "The audacity of hope had its rendezvous with destiny. ... Obama is now an adopted son of Camelot". On March 19, 2008, Moran, interviewed Democratic presidential candidate Obama. On September 16, 2008, Moran and Arash Ghadishah reported on how Lisi Harrison's The Clique had taken young American women by storm. A few days later, he reported on the Republican party's candidate John McCain changing his mind on such things like regulating Wall Street. McCain was a champion of financial deregulation in 1999 with the repeal of the Glass-Steagall Act.

In early February 2009, Moran reported on Jerry Falwell's death. In March 2009, he reported on Alzheimer's disease. In 2009, someone in America developed it every seventy seconds. By the mid 21st century, someone will be diagnosed with Alzheimer's disease every thirty-three seconds. On April 8, 2009, Moran reported the Mexican government sent troops to Juarez, Mexico. In mid April, he reported that Mexican President Felipe Calderon vowed to take on the drug cartels in the Mexican drug war. In May 2009, Moran reported from Ciudad Juarez, Mexico where drug violence persisted. In July 2009, Moran interviewed President Obama. In August 2009, Moran and Mary Mash reported on healthcare reform that President Obama moved for. In October 2009, he interviewed Pastor Mark Driscoll. "An idol is someone or something that occupies the place of God in your life," he said. "[It] gives you identity, meaning, value, purpose, love, significance, security. When the Bible uses the word 'idol', that's what it's getting at." Driscoll's theory is every person has a deep inner need to worship something. In December 2009, Moran, Ariane De Vogue, and Devin Dwyer reported on the United States Supreme Court's decision on Citizens United v. Federal Election Commission which effectively struck down restrictions on corporations and unions, however, the ruling does not effect existing prohibition on direct contributions to candidates.

In early January 2010, Moran with Jennifer Parker contributing reported on the United States Embassy in Yemen would close down to beat the Al Qaeda surge. In mid January 2010, Moran reported that Lou Dobbs was considering running for President of the United States in 2012 with Melinda Arons contributing. In late January 2010, Moran reported on the State of the Union by President Barack Obama in which he criticized United States Supreme Court's decision on Citizens United v. Federal Election Commission. In early February 2010, Moran reported on ten American missionaries remaining in a Haitian jail after an earthquake in Haiti for kidnapping thirty-three children. In mid February 2010, Moran with Mary Marsh contributing reported on John Joe Gray, the leader of a religious separatist group, in Trinidad, Texas with a ten-year standoff with Henderson County Sheriff Department. In March 2010, Moran and Hanna Siegel reported on sex offenders in the United States. In April 2010, Moran interviewed Starbucks CEO Howard Schultz with Charles Herman contributing on gun control and health care. "We woke up one day and all the sudden Starbucks was in the middle of this political crossfire between the people who want to bring a gun into Starbucks and the people who want to prevent it," said Schultz. "It is a very difficult, fragile situation. We're trying to abide by the law."

In May 2010, Moran interviewed Jeffrey MacDonald, a former United States Army captain, physician, and convicted murderer, and his current wife, Kathryn Kurichh, on moving for a new trial for the murders of his former wife and two children. Mary Marsh and Eamon McNiff contributed to the story. In July 2010 Moran spoke with Andrew Breitbart, an American voter and blogger, about anger and discontent. In August 2010, Moran reported on a small grassroots organization meets to promote one goal: the right to carry weapons openly in public by pushing the boundaries. In September 2010, Moran interviewed Terry Jones, a preacher from Gainesville, Florida about burning the Koran. In October 2010, Moran reported on Alzheimer's disease usually associated with old age, however, more than 500,000 Americans with Alzheimer's and dementia were diagnosed before the age of 65. He also talked about his mother's battle with the disease. In an interview, reporter Laura Jones said, "Who would ever expect that a 46-year-old man would have Alzheimer's? It was just completely shocking".

In early February 2011, Moran reported that General Hassan al-Roueini heard the Egyptian protesters. On February 7, 2011, he interviewed Abdul Rahman Yusuf, a poet and political activist at Tahrir Square in Egypt. A day later, Moran interviewed Wael Ghonim moving for Egypt's President Hosni Mubarak's ouster who said "I'm not a hero, but those who were martyred are the heroes". On February 10, 2011, he reported that President Obama asked the Egyptian government to move swiftly to explain the changes that have been made after a transition of authority. That same day Moran reported that Egyptian Vice President Omar Suleiman said that President Mubarak had stepped down. The next day he reported that President Obama praised the protesters and their peaceful demonstrations. Obama greatly admired Mubarak's resignation. In March 2011, Moran took a different perspective of the attempted assassination of Ronald Reagan thirty years after it happened. In early April 2011, Moran reported on the Libyan civil war from Derna and interviewed Abdel Hakim al-Hasadi, a rebel commander in Libya, who said he worked for the National Transitional Council (TNC). On April 12, 2011, he reported from Ajdabiya, Libya continuing his coverage of the Libyan civil war and describing it as purgatory. A few days later, Moran reported on the arrest of Egypt's President Hosni Mubarak. In early June 2011, he reported on Jack Kevorkian, how he handled a terminal patient's right to die by physician-assisted suicide, and reflected on his two trials. In mid June 2011, Moran and Ariane De Vogue reported on the United States Supreme Court's decision on Wal-Mart Stores, Inc. v. Dukes in which the court ruled that a group of roughly 1.5 million women could not be certified as a valid class of plaintiffs in a class-action lawsuit for employment discrimination against Walmart. In July 2011, he talked with people who believe they have faced Satan and been tortured by him at a church in Buffalo. In early August 2011, Moran and Elizabeth Stuart reported on the United States Food and Drug Administration's (FDA) definition what foods are gluten-free. The label must have no more than 20 parts per million gluten. It is to protect people with celiac disease, a genetic disorder that causes an intolerance to gluten. In late August 2011, Moran reported on Glen Campbell's 'Goodbye Tour' after being diagnosed with Alzheimer's disease. Campbell's guitar playing was on Frank Sinatra's Strangers in the Night and The Beach Boys' Fun, Fun, Fun. In the interview with him and his wife, he said, "Definitely take care of what's today and tomorrow's going to have what it has".

In January 2012, Moran reported on the Republican party's candidates for the office of President, who were Mormon (Mitt Romney), two Roman Catholics (Newt Gingrich and Rick Santorum), and a Southern Baptist (Ron Paul). In May 2012, Moran interviewed Jacob Ostreicher, flooring contractor from Brooklyn, who is in a Bolivian prison. In October 2012, Moran and Mary Marsh interviewed Dr. Eben Alexander, who nearly died four years earlier when a ferocious meningitis infection caused by E. coli that attacked his brain. In December 2012, Moran and Ariane De Vogue reported that the United States Supreme Court took up two cases about same sex marriage to determinee if there is a fundamental right to it.

On January 2, 2013, Moran and Alex Waterfield interviewed Jacob Ostreicher, who had been jailed for more than a year in Bolivia and uncharged. Bolivian authorities accused him of being a money launderer. Ostreicher said, "Absolutely, 100 percent innocent, and the prosecutors know that I'm 100 percent innocent." The next day, Moran interviewed Sal Khan, founder of Khan Academy, who partnered with the Gates Foundation and Google to form the academy. The academy teaches thousands of free lessons online. In mid January 2013, Moran and Katie Hinmam reported on the long-term consequences of concussions. Unequal Technologies makes Concussion Reduction Technology (CRT) which is designed to stick inside the helmet as a liner to the existing helmet pads. In late January 2013, Moran reported on the United States Court of Appeals for the District of Columbia Circuit's decision on recess appointments for President Obama. In March 2013, Moran, Chris Good, Ariane De Vogue, and Sarah Parnass reported that the United States Supreme Court seemed to struggle with the notion of extending marriage rights to same-sex couples. On April 3, 2013, Moran and Nick Capote reported on Sheriff Joe Arpaio's answer to school safety which was an armed civilian posse. The next day Moran reported on how five Holocaust survivor families escaped Nazi persecution by hiding in a cave. In mid May 2013, Moran and Enjoli Francis reported on abortion doctor Kermit Gosnell which he was found guilty of First Degree Murder. In late May 2013, Moran, Ariane De Vogue, Abby D. Phillip, and Josh Hafenbrack reported on Affirmative Action and the United States Supreme Court decision to send it back to Fifth Circuit federal appeals court on the grounds that the lower court did not review the university's affirmative action program carefully enough. On June 19, 2013, Moran, Ariane De Vogue, and Josh Hafenbrack reported on the constitutionality of California's Proposition 8 that was passed in 2008 which the United States Supreme Court declined to rule and dismissed the case on procedural grounds. The same day, they reported on the Defense of Marriage Act (DOMA) and how the United States Supreme Court decided to strike down a key section. The next day, he and Michael S. James reported on the death of James Gandolfini in Italy.

==== Chief Foreign Correspondent ====
"Terry's range as a reporter is exceptional. He is equally adept interviewing a confessed hit man in one of Mexico's most notorious gangs as he is breaking down some of the most complex Supreme Court decisions...A brilliant writer and gifted storyteller, Terry has the ability to see the story no one else sees, explain its importance to the audience, and do it all in a stylish and compelling way."

— Ben Sherwood (2013), then-president of ABC News when Moran was named ABC's Chief Foreign Correspondent

Moran began his role as Chief Foreign Correspondent in June 2013. In June 2013, Moran, Ariane De Vogue, and Abby D. Phillip reported on Shelby County v. Holder that the United States Supreme Court had struck down a part of the Voting Rights Act of 1965. In December 2013, he, Molly Hunter and Ben Gittleson reported on Ronnie Smith, an American teacher who was shot and killed in Benghazi. On June 10, 2014, Moran reported Iraqi troops were on the brink of losing to ISIS. In mid June 2014, he reported from Kirkuk Air Base which the United States military relinquished control in 2011. ISIS never came near the base, but Iraqi troops fled. On July 21, 2014, Moran and Kirit Radsia reported that the black boxes were recovered from Malaysia Airlines Flight 17 with more than 270 bodies also recovered. A day later, he and Dan Good reported on the wreckage of Malaysia Airlines Flight 17 in Ukraine. The plane was "significantly altered". In late July 2014, Moran reported from Gaza in an Israeli armored unit. In early August 2014, he reported on the ceasefire in Gaza. In mid August 2014, Moran with Lee Ferran, Rym Momtaz, and Mazin Faiq reported that President Barack Obama said the Mosul Dam was not under control by ISIS. The Kurdish and Iraqi forces retook it. The United States military had conducted air strikes. In mid September 2014, he reported that Scotland was deciding whether or not to break away from the United Kingdom. In late September 2014, Moran reported on the Siege of Kobanî. ISIS fighters had been shelling the city for a month. The United States and its allies started air strikes. In November 2014, he reported on a 1500-year-old manuscript that lays out the story of Jesus’ love life. In December 2014, Moran reported on the Jihadist attacks in 14 countries across the world in November 2014.

In early January 2015, Moran, Dan Good, and Meghan Keneally reported on the deadly attack at a satirical newspaper's office in Paris. Two French-born Algerian Muslim brothers, Saïd and Chérif Kouachi, targeted the French satirical weekly magazine Charlie Hebdo. Twelve people were murdered and eleven injured. In late January 2015, he and Michael S. James reported on the 70th anniversary of the liberation of Auschwitz. About 300 Holocaust survivors returned to the death camp in Poland where more than 1 million were slaughtered during World War II. The commemoration was smaller than in the years before. In early February 2015, Moran reported on the Ukrainian civil war. France and Germany wanted peace while Vladimir Putin supported the rebels. Secretary of State John Kerry supported France and Germany's position. The Ukrainian government wanted more weapons in response to the rebels. The Ukrainian government claimed that their soldiers were being hammered by the rebels and some 9,000 troops from Russia. In February 2015, Moran interviewed a United States Army veteran who was born in Detroit. In late February 2015, Moran reported on the assassination of Boris Nemtsov, who was gunned down while walking across a bridge. In March 2015, Moran reported on the Republican party's letter to Iran that some think violated the Logan Act. A few days later, he and Molly Hunter reported about Putin emerging after being out of the public eye for a week. In April 2015, Moran and Michael S. James reported after the devastating earthquake in Nepal that Rishi Kanal was pulled out of rubble safely after being under it for 80 hours. In June 2015, he reported from the front lines in the fight against ISIS. The Iran-backed militia exude confidence while some Iraq soldiers seem bleak. A soldier told him, "We will be victorious over the cowardly traitors with God's will." In September 2015, Moran reported on how a Syrian refugee family was Smuggled from Syria to Greece as they were desperate to find a way to Germany. In what has been the greatest mass migration here since the Second World War, at least 350,000 refugees have illegally entered Europe so far this year. The family was looking for a better life. A few weeks later, he and Meghan Keneally reported about the journey of twin 12-year-old Syrian refugee boys, Khaled and Fahad, from Damascus, Syria to the Serbian border town of Horgoš. In November 2015, Moran spoke with Pope Francis about Little Sisters of the Poor and their case about contraceptives concerning the Affordable Care Act.

In January 2016, Moran reported from northern Syria where Russian troops were on the ground. Major General Igor Konashenkov was a spokesman for the Ministry of Defense. Human rights organizations claim that Russia's war effort there was slaughtering civilians. In February 2016, he with Gillian Mohney reported on the mosquito-borne Zika virus continuing to spread through Central and South America. Pope Francis stated that contraception could be seen as "the lesser of two evils" if women are concerned about having children with the birth defect microcephaly. The pope compared the situation to a decree issued by Pope Paul VI, which said nuns in Africa could use contraception due to the threat of rape. In March 2016, he and Jackie Jesko reported from Kathmandu, Nepal since the devastating earthquake in April 2015. The earthquake cased so much damage that Durbar Square did not reopen for two months. A few weeks later, Moran reported on the deadly terror attacks in Brussels where thirty-two died and with talking to Secretary of State John Kerry about him vacationing in Europe. Justin Fishel and Elizabeth McLaughlin contributed to the story. In April 2016, he reported on the more than 70 refugee men, women and children who were lost at sea and turned up by Lesbos. More than half a million refugees fled war-torn countries. Those who survived the journey have mostly moved north toward Germany and Sweden. Pope Francis visited Lesbos and met with refugees on the Greek island. About 4,000 refugees were housed in detention camps because of a deal made with the European Union and Turkey.

In May 2016, Moran visited North Korea. Citizens were startled when the press corps walked down the long avenue leading to the grand April 25 hall. They waited for an hour and then rain began falling. The press corps was then directed back to their buses and returned to the hotel. He and others of the press corps went to the Kim Jong Suk Silk Mill, named after the wife of North Korea founder Kim Il Sung. Massive mosaic portraits of the men flanked the doors. They were firmly instructed that if they took pictures not to crop or leave anything out. Moran reported that Kim Jong Un made a major declaration during North Korea's seventh congress of the Workers' Party. Kim also pledged that North Korea would follow a policy of non-proliferation of nuclear technology. He wanted to improve and normalize relations with countries that have been "hostile" in the past.

In June 2016, Moran reported from the USS Harry S. Truman, a Nimitz-class aircraft carrier, had been battling ISIS since December 2015 in both Syria and Iraq. In August 2016, he, with Jackie Jesko contributing, reported on the that donations are sometimes going to orphanage owners' pockets in Nepal putting children at risk. In September 2016, Moran reported on Leslie Jones' twitter troll, Milo Yiannopoulos, who was banned after attacking the actress. Emily Taguchi and Claire Pederson contributed to the story. A few days later, he, with Jackie Jesko contributing, reported on Yunika, a Kumari, in Nepal. She was 7 years old at the time. In October 2016, Moran reported that if Evan McMullin wins his home state of Utah, it will pull electoral votes away. Megan Redman and Lauren Effron contributed to the story. In November 2016, he reported on with Donald Trump leading the GOP ticket, many evangelicals are at an impasse. Claire Pederson, John Kapetaneas, and Lauren Effron contributed to the story.

In March 2017, Moran spoke with BBC News global science correspondent Rebecca Morelle about Mount Etna erupting after magma exploded upon contact with snow where 10 people were hurt. Michael Edison Hayes and Ben Gittleson contributed to the story. In April 2017, he with Morgan Winsor and Clark Bentson reported on Pope Francis' visit to Egypt after the Palm Sunday church bombings. In May 2017, Moran with Emily Shapiro reported on the Manchester Arena bombing and Mayor Andy Burnham discussing the leaks to the media. In July 2017, he with Karma Allen and Morgan Winsor interviewed Natalia Veselnitskaya about Donald Trump, Jr moving for intel on Hillary Clinton. In September 2017, he reported on Hugh Hefner, the 'revolutionary', who transformed US commerce, not sex. In October 2017, Moran and Aicha El Hammar Castano reported that Catalan President Carles Puigdemont's speech following a referendum in which voters called for independence. Later in October 2017, he reported on Catalonia's independence from Spain. In December 2017, he reported on Russian President Vladimir Putin that allegations of contact between U.S. and Russian officials during the 2016 election as "all invented."

==== Senior National Correspondent ====
In January 2018, Moran and Justin Doom reported on President Trump attending the World Economic Forum. Also in January, he reported on the state of the United States economy. In February 2018, Moran reported on the 2018 State of the Union Address asking if President Trump was stealing Democrats' ideas like paid parental leave, price controls on prescription drugs, and tougher trade agreements. In March 2018, he, along with Chris Vlasto and James Gordon Meek, reported that former Russian spy Sergey Skripal and his daughter, Yulia, and at least 38 other people in the U.K. were sickened by the release of a nerve agent. On July 10, 2018, Moran reported that Brett Kavanaugh as a justice on the United States Supreme Court would be a Federalist Society triumph. The next day Moran disputed Fox News anchor Shannon Bream's feelings of danger over President Trump's nominee Kavanaugh for the Supreme Court. In October 2018, he, with Morgan Winsor, reported that Kavanaugh's college roommate claimed he lied under oath about drinking. Later that month, Moran reported that the Washington State Supreme Court declared the death penalty unconstitutional. In January 2019, he, along with John Kapetaneas and Lauren Effron, reported about hacking in the Romanian city of Râmnicu Vâlcea. In March 2019, Moran reported on The College Admissions Scandal. In July 2019, Moran and Rick Klein reported on the Mueller Report as the Democrats eyed the 2020 United States presidential election. In November 2019, he reported on the first impeachment of President Donald Trump. In April 2020, Moran and Becky Perlow reported on the effects of the COVID-19 pandemic within the Jewish community in the United States. In June 2020, he and Terrance Smith reported on President Trump's views on monument vandals. In March 2021, Moran and Becky Perlow reported on how many people in Maryland were getting vaccinations from a mobile unit and bringing hope. In March 2023, he along with Sasha Pezenik and Kaitlyn Morris reported on new intelligence and scientific reports on COVID. In April 2023, Moran along with Sasha Pezenik, Josh Margolin, and Kaitlyn Morris reported that Senate Republicans believed the theory that COVID-19 emerged from an accidental lab leak in Wuhan—and possibly, even more than one leak.

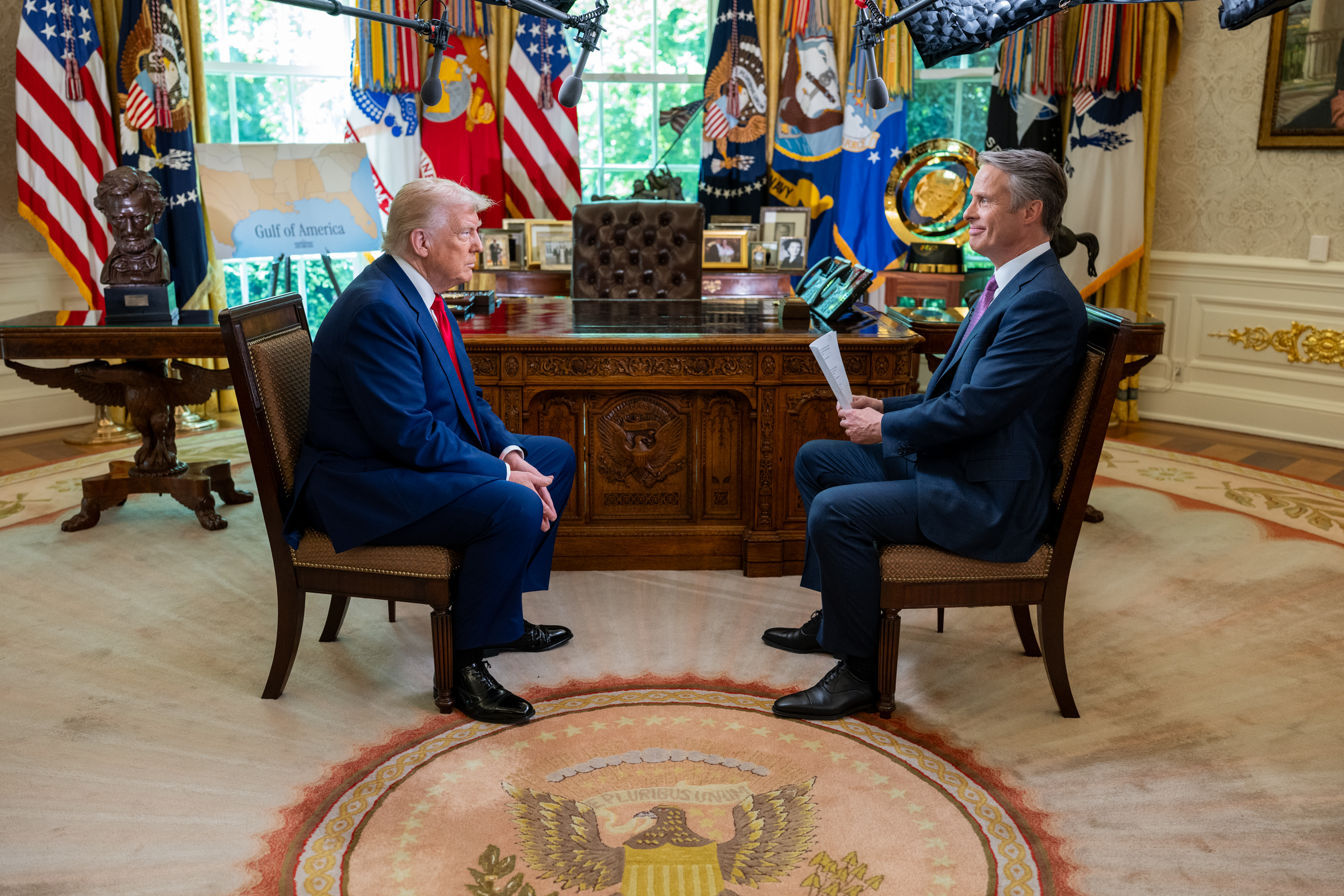
Moran interviewing President Donald Trump in the Oval Office, April 2025

In late April 2025, Moran interviewed President Trump about his first 100 days in office during his second term. During the forty minute interview, Moran asked about the Declaration of Independence, Kilmar Ábrego García, a Salvadorian man living in Maryland who was deported, his tariffs against China, economic concerns about price increases for American consumers, due process, and the Russo-Ukrainian War, which President Trump described as "Biden's war". Also in the interview President Trump said Declaration of Independence is about 'Love and Respect', and he pressured Moran repeatedly trying to get Moran to accept a photoshopped photograph as real. During the interview, President Trump told Moran that he picked him and did not know of him. In May 2025, Pope Leo XIV met with Moran and James Longman.

==== Controversial tweet ====
On June 8, 2025, Moran was suspended by ABC News for a midnight tweet (which Moran later deleted) about President Trump and his Deputy Chief of Staff, Stephen Miller. The tweet read,

Yes, he is one of the people who conceptualizes the impulses of the Trumpist movement and translates them into policy. But that's not what's interesting about Miller. It's not brains. It's bile. Miller is a man who is richly endowed with the capacity for hatred. He's a world class hater. You can see this just by looking at him because you can see that his hatreds are his spiritual nourishment. He eats his hate. Trump is a world-class hater. But his hatred only a means to an end, and that end is his own glorification. That's his spiritual nourishment.

Miller wrote on social media, "privileged anchors and reporters narrating and gatekeeping our society have been radicals adopting a journalist's pose." An ABC News spokesperson stated the network "does not condone subjective personal attacks on others. The post does not reflect the views of ABC News and violated our standards." White House Press Secretary Karoline Leavitt said, "This is unhinged and unacceptable". Leavitt labeled him a "so-called ‘journalist'". She referred to Moran's post as a "rampage". On June 10, 2025, it was announced that ABC would immediately "part ways" with Moran; ABC News had previously said Moran was near the end of his contract term. On June 17, 2025, Moran said that he stood by his post criticizing Trump and his adviser. He said "It wasn’t a drunk tweet" to defend his post of Miller on X.

==== Reaction to dismissal ====
Dan Kennedy thought that ABC was right to suspend Moran, but not fire him. Kennedy quoted media critic Margaret Sullivan,

I’m amazed that Moran posted what he did. It's well outside the bounds of what straight-news reporters do. It's more than just calling a lie a lie, or identifying a statement as racist – all of which I think is necessary. Moran is not a pundit or a columnist or any other kind of opinion journalist…. I would hate to see Moran – with his worthy career at ABC News, where he's been for almost 30 years – lose his job over this. I hope that the honchos at ABC let a brief suspension serve its purpose, and put him back to work.

Kennedy disagreed with people who thought ABC was correct in dismissing Moran. Tom Jones of Poynter media reported that Leavitt called for ABC News to punish Moran. Jones wrote,

I traded emails with another former journalist who told me that, in a group chat with other journalists, they settled on this general point: that maybe what Moran posted was true, but by sending his tweet, he played directly into the hands of those on the right who are trying to undermine trust in the media and, in many ways, damage our democracy.

Colby Hall of Mediaite thought that Moran made a mistake like a late-night lapse when you slip up and the truth comes out a little too unvarnished. He pointed out Megyn Kelly's blast of President Joe Biden which now she is demanding a journalist be punished for criticizing a president. Hall thought that Miller considered Moran's dismissal a win.

=== Post ABC News (2025–present) ===
On June 11, 2025, Moran announced on X that he would continue his reporting from Substack after his dismissal by ABC News, where his publication there is entitled, Real Patriotism with Terry Moran.

== Awards ==
Over the years, Moran's journalism work has been recognized with many awards, including the George Foster Peabody Award, the Emmy Award, the Merriman Smith Award from the White House Correspondents' Association (twice), and the Thurgood Marshall Journalism Award.

In 2006, Moran won the annual White House press corps Award.

== Personal life ==
Moran has been married twice. He married his first wife, Karen Osler, in the late 1980s. They have one child together. In 2015, he became engaged to his second wife, Johanna Cox, a Chinese-language linguist and China intelligence analyst who previously worked as a journalist at Elle magazine. She was the winner of the reality television show Stylista. The couple have three children.

In 2000, Moran's mother died from complications of Alzheimer's Disease.

Moran describes himself as "not that liberal" and that he is a "proud centrist".

Media offices
| Preceded by Sam Donaldson | ABC News Chief White House Correspondent; September 1999 – November 2005 | Succeeded by Martha Raddatz |
| Preceded by Ted Koppel | Nightline anchor November 28, 2005 – with Martin Bashir and Cynthia McFadden | Succeeded by Dan Abrams |
