= Ted Koppel =

American television journalist (born 1940)

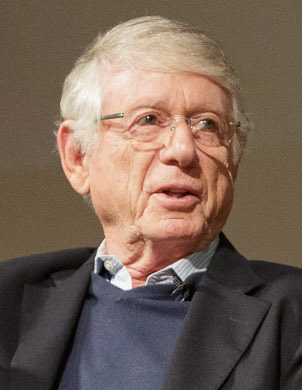
- Koppel in 2017
- Born: Edward James Martin Koppel; February 8, 1940 (age 86); Nelson, Lancashire, England
- Education: Syracuse University (BS); Stanford University (MA)
- Occupations: Journalist; news anchor; author
- Years active: 1963–present
- Known for: Nightline (1980–2005)
- Spouse: Grace Anne Dorney (m. 1963)
- Children: 4, including Andrea

Edward James Martin Koppel (born February 8, 1940) is an American broadcast journalist, best known as the anchor for Nightline, from the program's inception in 1980 until 2005.

Before Nightline, he spent 20 years as a broadcast journalist and news anchor for ABC. After becoming host of Nightline, he was regarded as one of the outstanding serious-minded interviewers on American television. Five years after its 1980 debut, the show had a nightly audience of about 7.5 million viewers.

After leaving Nightline, Koppel worked as managing editor for the Discovery Channel, a news analyst for NPR and BBC World News America and a contributor to Rock Center with Brian Williams. Since 2016, Koppel has served as senior contributor to CBS News Sunday Morning. His career as a foreign and diplomatic correspondent earned him numerous awards, including nine Overseas Press Club awards and over 50 Emmy Awards.

== Early life and education ==
Edward James Martin Koppel, an only child, was born in Nelson, England. His parents were German Jews who fled Germany after the rise of Adolf Hitler and Nazism. In Germany, Koppel's father, Erwin, was the managing director of Gummi-Peter, a tire manufacturing company. To help the British economy, the Home Secretary invited him to establish a factory in Lancashire, England. When war broke out in Europe in 1939, Koppel's father was declared an enemy alien and interned on the Isle of Man for approximately a year.

Koppel was born in 1940, shortly before his father was interned. To provide for her infant son, his mother sold her personal jewelry. After he was released from internment, Koppel's father was not permitted to work in England. In the late 1940’s and early 1950’s Erwin Koppel brought suit in the German court system for reparations, restoring some of what the Nazis had seized. Following the end of the war the family decided to leave for the United States. While in England, Ted Koppel was a pupil at Abbotsholme School, in Derbyshire. In 1953 when he was 13, the family immigrated to the United States, where his mother, Alice, became a singer and pianist, and his father, Erwin, opened a tire factory. Koppel's boyhood hero was radio broadcaster Edward R. Murrow, whose factual reports during the bombing of London inspired him to become a journalist. The bombing of London ended when Koppel was 16 months old.

After attending the McBurney School, a private preparatory institution in New York, Koppel attended Syracuse University, graduating at age 20 with a Bachelor of Science degree. He was a member of the Alpha Chi chapter of the Pi Kappa Alpha fraternity. One roommate recalled that Koppel "was incredibly focused and had a photographic memory. He remembers almost every conversation he ever had with anybody. And the man never needs sleep."

Koppel then went to Stanford University, where he earned a Master of Arts degree in mass-communications research and political science. While at Stanford, he met his future wife, Grace Anne Dorney.

== Career ==
=== Early career ===
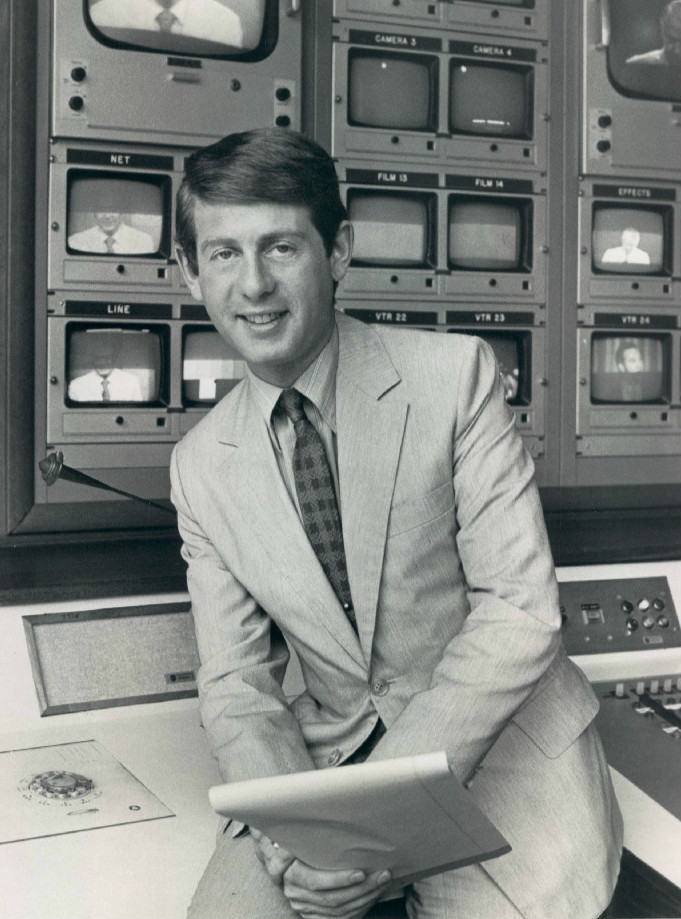
Koppel as the diplomatic correspondent for ABC News, 1976

Koppel had a brief stint as a teacher before being hired as a copyboy at The New York Times and as a writer at WMCA Radio in New York. In June 1963, he became the youngest correspondent ever hired by ABC Radio News, working on the daily Flair Reports program. His coverage of the Kennedy assassination in 1963 with Charles Osgood caused the national news audience to take notice. He was scheduled to do a short report, but a delay during the crisis forced him to ad-lib for an hour and a half.

In 1964, he covered his first of many presidential nominating conventions. He also began covering the civil rights movement in Selma, Alabama. ABC officials were impressed by Koppel's ability to clarify issues using plain language. In 1966, he became the ABC News correspondent for the Vietnam War, moving from radio broadcasting to national television. He accepted the assignment only after the network agreed to send his wife and their two children to Hong Kong so they could be nearby. Before going he took a course to learn the Vietnamese language.

He returned in 1968 to cover the campaign of Richard Nixon, before becoming Hong Kong bureau chief, and U.S. State Department correspondent where Koppel formed a friendship with Henry Kissinger. According to Nixon advisor John Ehrlichman, Koppel's friendship with Kissinger was partly due to their similar backgrounds, having Jewish refugee parents and emigrating to America in their youth.

Koppel was among those traveling to China with U.S. President Richard Nixon in 1972. He spoke about it with the USC US-China Institute in their "Assignment: China" documentary series about American media coverage of China. Koppel likened the trip to a "journey to the dark side of the moon". By 1975, he was anchoring the ABC Evening News on Saturdays, and he continued to file reports for ABC Radio.

Koppel would often report on State Department foreign conferences, as when he traveled with Kissinger during his meetings in Egypt and Israel in 1975. He said about Kissinger: "I have a high regard for Henry. He has a first-class mind. A half hour with him gives me a better insight into a foreign policy question than hours with others."

In the mid-1970s, Koppel took a year off from his career, to stay home with his children so that his wife could complete her education at Georgetown Law School. Koppel's decision upset ABC News president Roone Arledge, who demoted Koppel from news anchor when he returned to the network.

In April 1979, he was lead reporter for an eleven-segment series, "Second to None?", which focused on explaining the dangers of nuclear war. He did his own research and wanted to present "complex material to an audience that hasn't paid much attention in the past but must in the future ... if there is to be a future". For the series he received an Alfred I. duPont–Columbia University Award.

=== Host of Nightline ===
In 1980, Koppel became known for his work as the host of a late-night news program called Nightline. The program originated as a series of special reports about the 444-day-long Iran hostage crisis, during which Iranian militants held 52 Americans captive, beginning in early November 1979. At first, the program was called The Iran Crisis: America Held Hostage, and was hosted by Frank Reynolds. Koppel eventually joined Reynolds as co-anchor. In March 1980, the program evolved into Nightline, with Koppel as its host. Koppel spent twenty-five years anchoring the program, before leaving ABC and Nightline in late November 2005.

While hosting Nightline, Koppel also hosted a series of special programs called Viewpoint, beginning in 1981, which provided media criticism and analysis. The show was envisioned by ABC News Vice President George Watson as a way to address any media bias that viewers might believe that they encountered on the network. Broadcast before a live audience, it provided viewers with a chance to question how stories were reported or critique television news. Viewpoint was broadcast sporadically, from 1981 until 1997.

Some liberal groups suggested that Koppel was a conduit for the government's point of view and accused him of favoring conservatives when selecting guests. In the late 1980s, the progressive media criticism organization Fairness and Accuracy in Reporting (FAIR) claimed that policymakers and ex-officials dominated the Nightline guest list, with critics of foreign policy less visible. In 1987, Newsweek called him the "quintessential establishment journalist". Koppel responded that "We are governed by the president and his cabinet and their people. And they are the ones who are responsible for our foreign policy, and they are the ones I want to talk to".

In 1990, Koppel interviewed Nelson Mandela in a US-style town hall meeting. Also in 1990, ABC News ran a one-hour special called "The Best of Nightline with Ted Koppel".

In 1997, Nate Thayer, a journalist writing for the Far Eastern Economic Review who later interviewed Pol Pot shortly before the latter's death, claimed that Koppel and ABC News made a verbal agreement with Thayer for the exclusive North American rights to use video from a show trial of Pol Pot that Thayer and Asiaworks Television videographer David McKaige witnessed on Nightline. Thayer claimed ABC purportedly violated that agreement by posting screenshot stills of video from the interview on ABCNews.com, violating the license as the site was accessible throughout the world, though not uploading the actual video.

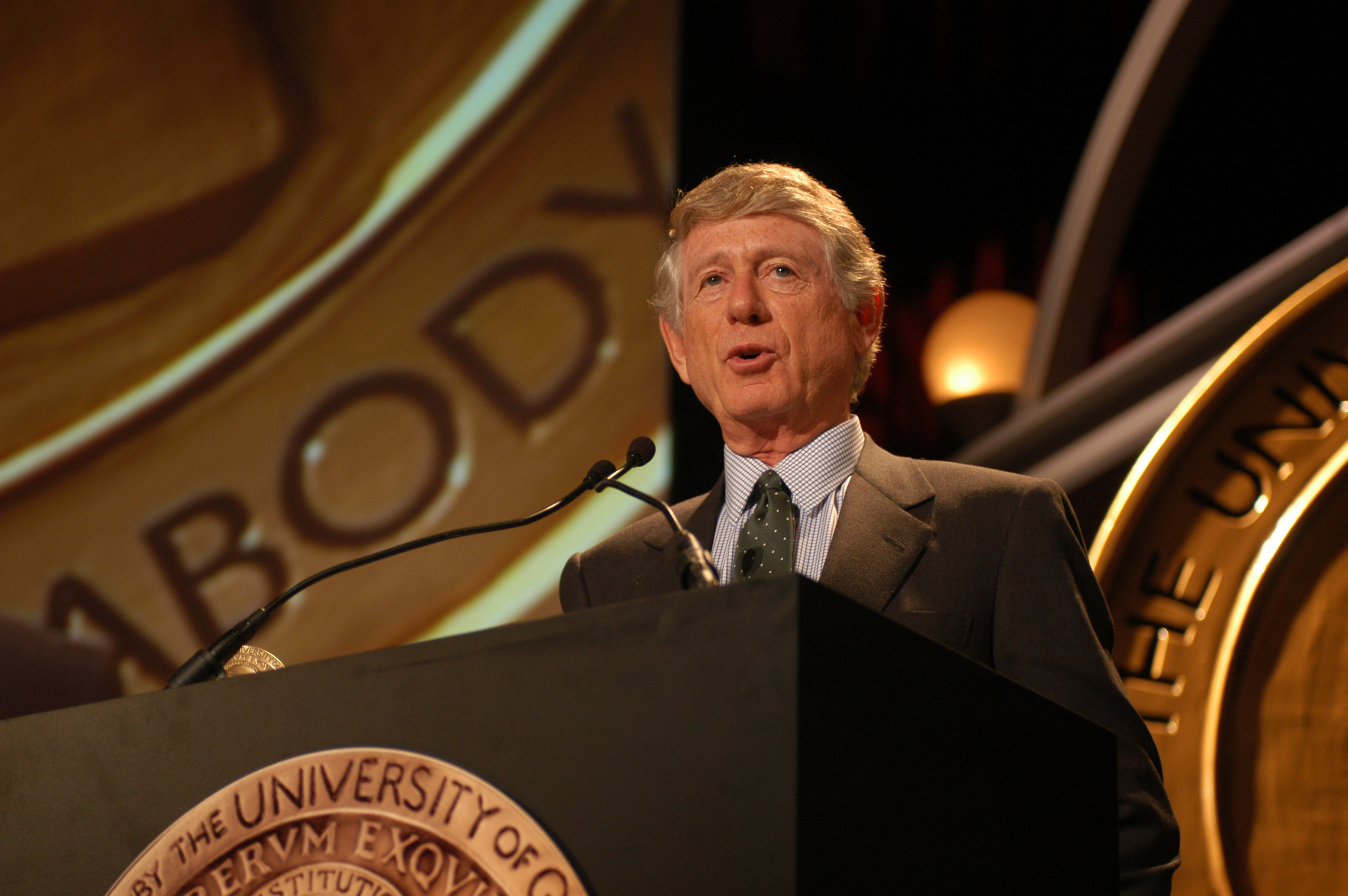
Ted Koppel at the 62nd Annual Peabody Awards

On November 22, 2005, Koppel stepped down from Nightline after 25 years with the program and left ABC after 42 years with the network. His final Nightline broadcast did not feature clips highlighting memorable interviews and famous moments from his tenure as host, as is typical when an anchor retires. Instead, the show replayed an episode of Nightline with Koppel's 1995 interviews with retired Brandeis University sociology professor Morrie Schwartz, who was dying of Lou Gehrig's disease.

On March 24, 2020, Koppel made a guest appearance on Nightline to mark the program's 40th anniversary, discussing how he and his wife had been coping with the COVID-19 pandemic.

=== Post-ABC career ===
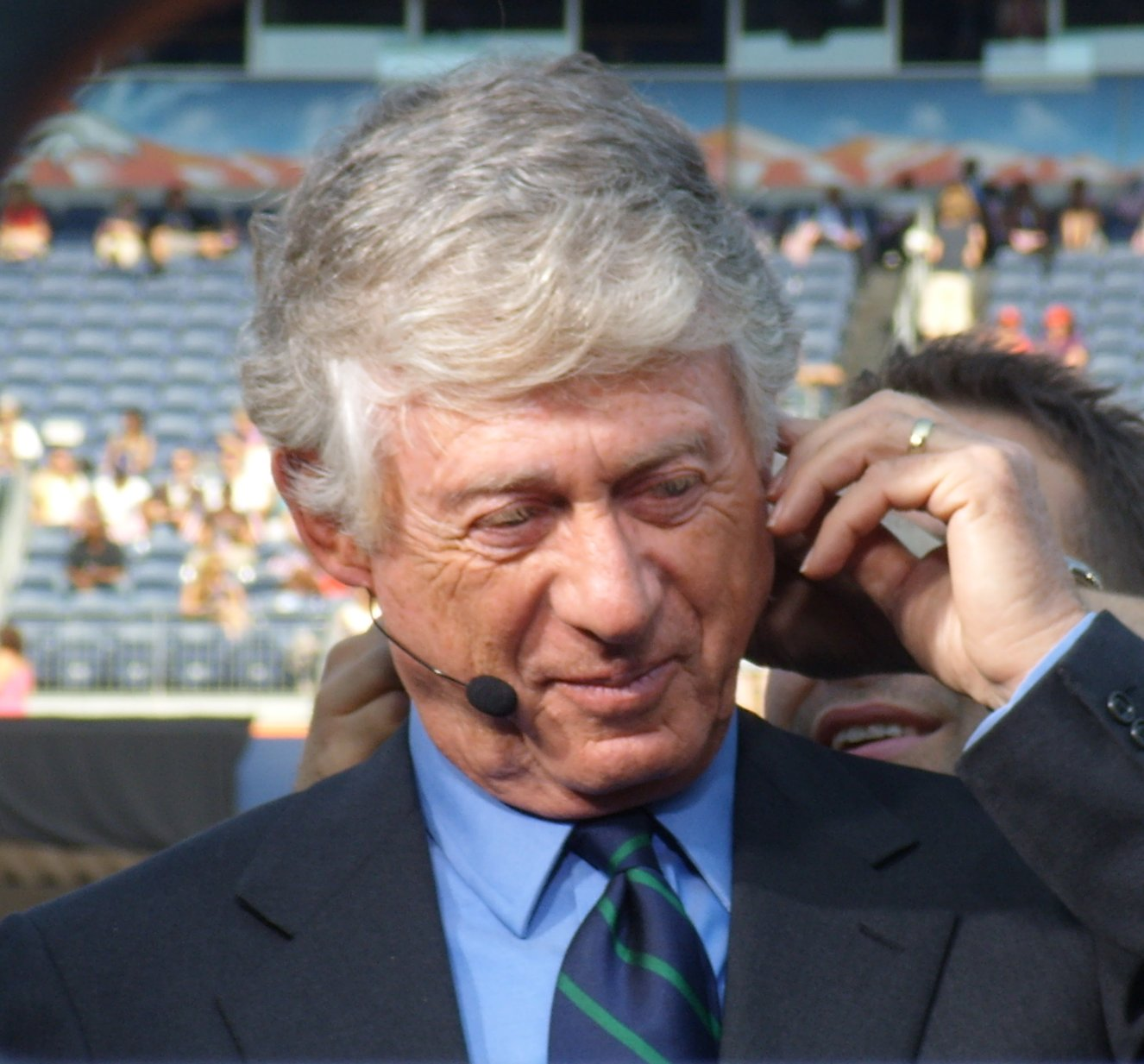
Koppel in 2008

Following Nightline Koppel has taken on a number of roles which span various formats of news media:

- He signed up as an op-ed-contributing columnist, effective January 29, 2006, for The New York Times,
- Following his departure from Nightline Koppel formed a three-year partnership with Discovery Communications as managing editor of the Discovery Channel. While at Discovery, Koppel produced several lengthy documentaries on a variety of subjects including a 2008 four-hour miniseries on China, which Koppel "ranks with some of the work that [he is] most proud of over the years". The four-part documentary, called The People's Republic of Capitalism, is an extensive look at the fast-changing country. It takes a look at the role of Chinese consumers in the growing yet communist economy. Koppel and Discovery Communications parted ways in November 2008, terminating their contract six months early, prompting rumors that Koppel would be hired for NBC's Meet the Press. Koppel stated that he was not interested in the job.
- Starting in June 2006, he provided commentary to Morning Edition, All Things Considered, and Day to Day on National Public Radio, joining NPR's other two Senior News Analysts, Cokie Roberts and Daniel Schorr. As such, he participated in the annual NPR Fourth of July reading of the Declaration of Independence in 2007. Koppel ended his regular commentary on NPR in April 2008, and last appeared as a news analyst on the network in 2014.
- Koppel made occasional guest appearances on The Daily Show appearing in extreme close-up as a disembodied head, acting as Jon Stewart's journalistic conscience, sometimes as the replacement for the so-called "Giant Head of Brian Williams" projected on the screen behind Stewart. Koppel has jokingly insisted that "this is the actual size of [Koppel's] head"
- Koppel worked for BBC World News America as a "contributing analyst" covering the 2008 Republican National Convention and the 2008 Democratic National Convention and hosted a special edition of the program in 2011.
- On December 12, 2011, Koppel made his first appearance on NBC Nightly News with Brian Williams as a reporter. He would later become a special correspondent for NBC's Rock Center until the show's cancellation.
- On August 6, 2013, The Wall Street Journal published an opinion piece by Koppel entitled "America's Chronic Overreaction to Terrorism".
- In 2015 Koppel published the book, Lights Out: A Cyberattack, A Nation Unprepared, Surviving the Aftermath, about the potential of a major cyber-attack on America's power grid.
- Since March 2016 Koppel has served as a special contributor to CBS News Sunday Morning.

== Honors and awards ==
- Thirteen Alfred I. duPont–Columbia University Awards for broadcast journalism; including the first Gold Baton for coverage of South Africa in 1985.
- Nine Overseas Press Club Awards for best television commentary on foreign news;
- Two George Polk Awards
- Two Sigma Delta Chi Awards
- Eight George Foster Peabody Awards
- 1987: honorary Doctor of Humane Letters degree from Duke University.
- 2004: Paul White Award, Radio Television Digital News Association
- 2006: honorary Doctor of Laws degree, University of Southern California

Koppel returns to Syracuse University regularly as a guest speaker. He was a member of the student-run WAER and keeps in touch with the student media at Syracuse. He is a member of the Pi Kappa Alpha fraternity.

=== Emmy Awards ===
- He has won 53 Emmy Awards, including:
- 1987 - Outstanding Coverage of a Breaking News Story - Programs (Nightline)
- 1999 - Outstanding Investigative Journalism - Programs (Nightline)
- 1999 - Outstanding Coverage of a Breaking News Story - Programs (Nightline)
- 2004 - Outstanding Feature Story in a News Magazine (Nightline)
- 2007 - Lifetime Achievement Award

== Personal life ==
Koppel is married to Grace Anne (née Dorney). He became a naturalized citizen of the United States in 1963. They have four children: Andrea (a former journalist), Deirdre, Andrew and Tara.

Andrew Koppel was found dead in an apartment in New York City on May 31, 2010, reportedly after a day-long drinking binge. A post mortem toxicology report identified illicit drugs.

Koppel speaks German and French, in addition to his native English.

Koppel is a long time friend of former Secretary of State Henry Kissinger. Both of them moved to the United States as children. Along with former Secretary of State Alexander Haig, Kissinger was the most frequent guest on Nightline. In a 1989 interview, Koppel commented, "Henry Kissinger is, plain and simply, the best secretary of state we have had in 20, maybe 30 years – certainly one of the two or three great secretaries of state of our century," then added, "I’m proud to be a friend of Henry Kissinger. He is an extraordinary man. This country has lost a lot by not having him in a position of influence and authority".

In 1993, Koppel and his wife paid $2.7 million for 16 acres (6.5 ha) overlooking the Potomac River in Potomac, Maryland. They sued to hold their neighbors to an agreement to limit the size of the houses in the neighborhood to 10,000 ft^{2} (930 m^{2}).

== See also ==
- Koppel on Discovery: Iran, The most Dangerous Nation?

Preceded by Frank Reynolds	Nightline anchor March 24, 1980 – November 22, 2005	Succeeded by Terry Moran, Cynthia McFadden, and Martin Bashir
