= Ronald E. McNair Post-Baccalaureate Achievement Program =

McNair Scholars: PhD access for underrepresented

The Ronald E. McNair Post-Baccalaureate Achievement Program, also referred to as the McNair Scholars Program, is a United States Department of Education initiative with the goal of increasing "attainment of PhD degrees by students from underrepresented segments of society," including first-generation low-income individuals and members from racial and ethnic groups historically underrepresented in graduate programs.

== History ==
The McNair Program is part of the federal TRIO programs, a group of educational opportunity programs created and governed by the Higher Education Act of 1965 and its subsequent amendments. The Act and its programs were part of Lyndon B. Johnson's Great Society program and were designed to address the lack of representation of disadvantaged groups in higher education. The name TRIO comes from the fact that there were originally three programs, but with revisions to the act, TRIO now encompasses over half a dozen programs including Upward Bound, Educational Talent Search, Veterans Upward Bound and Student Support Services. Notable alumni of the TRIO programs include Oprah Winfrey, John Quiñones, Angela Bassett, Franklin Chang-Diaz, José M. Hernández, Donna Brazile, Patrick Ewing, Henry Bonilla, and Viola Davis.

The program was named after African American scientist Ronald McNair. In 1986, McNair died aboard the Space Shuttle Challenger with the rest of his crew when the shuttle started to disintegrate shortly after its launch.

== Administration ==
The Department of Education makes grants to higher education institutions (or combinations of institutions) to administer the program for eligible students. In 2001, the average grant awarded was $229,396.

The program provides various activities to prepare students for doctoral study. These include academic advising, workshops, advice on graduate school applications and financial aid, test preparation, research conferences, and graduate school visits. Undergraduate research opportunities and faculty mentorship are also an integral part of the program.

== Eligibility criteria ==
Higher education institutions admit participants into their program who are "college students from disadvantaged backgrounds who have demonstrated strong academic potential." At least two-thirds of the participants in a grantee's program must be low income, first-generation students. Low-income is defined as family income that did not exceed 150 percent of the poverty line in the previous year. First-generation is defined as a student whose parents did not receive a bachelor's degree. The remaining percentage of participants can be from racial and ethnic groups traditionally underrepresented in graduate study. Underrepresented groups include African American/Black, Hispanic, and American Indian/Alaskan Native.

When determining eligibility using the underrepresented criteria, students can be accepted at the discretion of the Secretary of Education from a group not listed above if the group is shown to be underrepresented in certain disciplines through statistics. According to the Department of Education, as of 2007, "as a policy issue," Native Hawaiians and other Pacific Islanders (for example, people with origins in Guam, American Samoa, Mariana Islands, etc.) are considered underrepresented.

== Program today ==
While the first grants were made to 14 institutions in 1989, the program now exists on over 200 campuses nationwide. In 2001, about 70 percent of participants were low-income, first-generation students, and about 30 percent were from underrepresented racial groups; women accounted for 67 percent of McNair participants. McNair participants have also been shown to enroll in graduate programs at a higher rate than other first-generation, low-income students across the country.

McNair Scholars have gone on to attend and receive doctoral degrees from major universities,
