= Federal TRIO Programs =

Outreach program

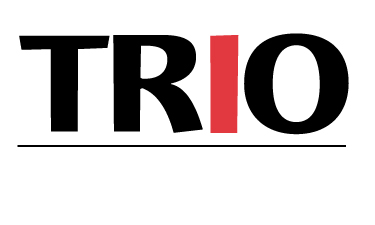
Main TRIO Programs Logo

The Federal TRIO Programs (TRIO, formerly stylized as TRiO) are the primary federal student outreach and student services programs in the United States designed to identify and provide services for individuals from disadvantaged backgrounds.

They are administered, funded, and implemented by the United States Department of Education.

TRIO is the umbrella term for eight programs targeted to serve and assist low-income individuals, first-generation college students, veterans, and individuals with disabilities to progress through the academic pipeline from middle school to post-baccalaureate programs.

TRIO also includes a training program for directors and staff of TRIO projects.

TRIO was given its name after the first three programs (Upward Bound, Talent Search, Student Support Services) were implemented; the name is not an acronym.

== History ==
TRIO’s origins are commonly traced to the War on Poverty era. Upward Bound was first established under the authority of the Economic Opportunity Act of 1964, signed August 20, 1964, and Talent Search was created the following year as part of the Higher Education Act of 1965, signed November 8, 1965. ED further notes that the “TRIO” label emerged after the Higher Education Act was amended in 1968 to add “Special Services for Disadvantaged Students,” later known as Student Support Services.

Subsequent expansions broadened TRIO’s target populations and education stages: Educational Opportunity Centers (EOC) were created in 1972 to focus on adult admissions and financial-aid navigation; Veterans Upward Bound was initiated in the early 1970s as a specialized Upward Bound effort for returning veterans; the McNair Program was authorized via 1986 Higher Education Act amendments and awarded first grants in 1989; and an Upward Bound Math and Science component was initiated in the 1990s to strengthen preparation for STEM pathways.

Current program administration is structured around competitive discretionary grants to institutions of higher education and other eligible entities; individual students generally do not apply to ED for TRIO grants but must be served through a local funded project. Statutory and regulatory provisions also define selection and assurance requirements, such as two-thirds participant composition rules in multiple programs and multi-year project periods (often five years, with program-specific exceptions such as a two-year period for staff development activities/training grants).

== Programs ==
The eight programs administered are (in order of creation):

Upward Bound
Upward Bound (UB) is a federally funded educational program within the United States. The program is one of a cluster of programs referred to as TRIO, all of which owe their existence to the federal Higher Education Act of 1965. Upward Bound programs are implemented and monitored by the United States Department of Education. The goal of Upward Bound is to provide certain categories of high school students better opportunities for attending college. The categories of greatest concern are those with low income, those with parents who did not attend college, and those living in rural areas. The program works through individual grants, each of which covers a restricted geographic area and provide services to approximately 50 to 100 students annually. Upward Bound alumni include Democratic Political Strategist Donna Brazile, Academy Award Winner Viola Davis, ABC News Correspondent John Quiñones and former NBA player Patrick Ewing.

Talent Search
Talent Search (TS) identifies junior high and high school students who might benefit from intervention strategies meant to increase the chances of the student pursuing a college education. There are currently more than 475 TS programs in the U.S. serving more than 389,000 students. At least two-thirds of the students in each local TS program must be from low-income economic backgrounds and from families where parents do not have a bachelor's degree. TS is a grant-funded program. Local programs are required to demonstrate that they meet federal requirements every five years in order to maintain funding. Talent Search alumni include US Congressman Henry Bonilla.

Student Support Services
Student Support Services (SSS) receives funding through a federal grant competition. Funds are awarded to institutions of higher education to provide opportunities for academic development, assist students with basic college requirements, and to motivate students toward the successful completion of their postsecondary education. SSS projects also may provide grant aid to current participants who are receiving Federal Pell Grants. The goal of SSS is to increase the college retention and graduation rates of its participants. Alumni of Student Support Services include Viola Davis and Franklin Chang-Diaz.

Educational Opportunity Centers
The Educational Opportunity Centers program (EOC) provides counseling and information on college admissions to qualified adults who want to enter or continue a program of postsecondary education. The program also provides services to improve the financial and economic literacy of participants. An important objective of the program is to counsel participants on financial aid options, including basic financial planning skills, and to assist in the application process. The goal of the EOC program is to increase the number of adult participants who enroll in postsecondary education institutions.

Veterans Upward Bound
Veterans Upward Bound (VUB) is designed to motivate and assist veterans in the development of academic and other requisite skills necessary for acceptance and success in a program of postsecondary education. The program provides assessment and enhancement of basic skills through counseling, mentoring, tutoring, and academic instruction in the core subject areas. The primary goal of the program is to increase the rate at which participants enroll in and complete postsecondary education programs.

Training Program for Federal TRIO Programs
The purpose of the Training Program for Federal TRIO Programs (TRIO Staff Training) is to increase the effectiveness of TRIO programs through staff training and development. Through a grant competition, funds are awarded to institutions of higher education and other public and private nonprofit institutions and organizations to support training to enhance the skills and expertise of project directors and staff employed in the Federal TRIO Programs. Funds may be used for conferences, seminars, internships, workshops, or the publication of manuals. Training topics are based on priorities established by the Secretary of Education and announced in Federal Register notices inviting applications.

Ronald E. McNair Post-Baccalaureate Achievement Program
The Ronald E. McNair Post-Baccalaureate Achievement Program, often referred to as the McNair Scholars Program, is a United States Department of Education initiative with a goal of increasing "attainment of PhD degrees by students from underrepresented segments of society," including first-generation low-income individuals and members from racial and ethnic groups historically underrepresented in graduate programs.

Upward Bound Math-Science
Upward Bound Math-Science (UBMS) was first authorized through the Higher Education Act of 1965 and reauthorized in the Higher Education Opportunity Act of 2008. Participating students must have completed the eighth grade and be low-income or "potential first-generation college students", with two-thirds of selected applicants meeting both of the criteria. The program provides counseling, summer programs, research, computer training, and connections to university faculty with the goal of improving students' math and science skills and helping them obtain degrees and careers in the maths and sciences. Students in the summer program attend 5 weeks of English, math, and science classes in the summer months. Mathematics classes include algebra, geometry, precalculus, calculus, and science courses are held for biology, chemistry, and physics. After completing the program, the student receives one college credit from the associated institution.

== Changes during the second Trump administration ==
During the second Trump administration, 100 grant programs saw their funding cut for alleged references to diversity, equity, and inclusion, TRIO was moved to the Department of Labor from the Department of Education, and Trump proposed it be defunded entirely. The administration planned to reduce the number of grants it awards, with the number of EOC programs being cut from 160 to 55 and the number of Talent Search programs being halved. The organization's focus also shifted from pushing students towards college, instead focusing on workforce development. This was opposed by critics, who argued that TRIO was one of the few development programs focused on college and not workforce development. They alleged that this change would be particularly damaging in rural areas, as well as other underserved sectors.

== Notable TRIO participants ==
- Hector Balderas, Upward Bound, New Mexico State Auditor
- Angela Bassett, Upward Bound, Academy Award-nominated actress
- Rick Blalock, Upward Bound, Emmy Award-winning Journalist and Producer
- Henry Bonilla, Talent Search, US Congressman
- Donna Brazile, Upward Bound, political strategist, TV commentator, interim chairperson of the Democratic National Committee
- Franklin Chang-Diaz, Student Support Services, first Hispanic astronaut
- Kenneth Corn, Talent Search, youngest Oklahoma State Representative (22), youngest Oklahoma State Senator (25)
- Viola Davis, Upward Bound, Student Support Services, Academy Award-winning actress
- Patrick Ewing, Upward Bound, coach, Olympian and former professional basketball player
- A.C. Green, Student Support Services, former professional basketball player
- Bernard Harris, Ronald E. McNair Scholar, first African-American astronaut to perform an extra-vehicular activity (spacewalk)
- Wil Haygood, Upward Bound, author and journalist
- José M. Hernández, Upward Bound, second Hispanic astronaut
- Jimmy Jam and Terry Lewis, Upward Bound, music producers
- Kenny Leon, Upward Bound, director, Tony Award-nominated actor
- Gwendolynne Moore, Student Support Services, US Congresswoman
- Anastasia Pittman, Student Support Services, Oklahoma State Representative
- Troy Polamalu, Upward Bound, professional football player
- John Quiñones, Upward Bound, correspondent for ABC News, Prime Time Live
- Kevin Shibilski, Student Support Services, Wisconsin State Senator
- Brandon Tonge, Ronald E. McNair Scholar, Talent Acquisition Executive
- Oprah Winfrey, Talk-show host, Actress, Philanthropist
- Aaron Ford, Governor-elect of Nevada

== See also ==
- GEAR UP
- PELL Grant
- Higher Education Act of 1965
- Higher Education Opportunity Act of 2008
- FAFSA
- Ronald E. McNair
- Ronald E. McNair Post-Baccalaureate Achievement Program
- Upward Bound
- educational equity
- U.S. Department of Education
- First-generation college students
