= Gio Benitez =

American journalist

- Born: Giovani Benitez; October 29, 1985 (age 41); Miami, Florida, U.S.
- Education: Florida International University (BA)
- Years active: 2009–present
- Agent: United Talent Agency
- Known for: Television reporter
- Spouse: Tommy DiDario (m. 2016)

Giovani Benitez (born October 29, 1985) is an American broadcast journalist and correspondent for ABC News, who appears on Good Morning America, World News Tonight, 20/20, and Nightline. He also hosted the Fusion collaboration version of Nightline. He has won three television news Emmy awards. On April 9, 2020, he was promoted to Transportation Correspondent, operating from New York City and Washington, D.C.

On September 8, 2020, he hosted a special season finale for the sixteenth season of the ABC program What Would You Do?

== Early life ==
Benitez was born in Miami to a family who immigrated to the United States from Cuba. Bilingual in both English and Spanish, Benitez graduated from Miami Coral Park High School in 2004; and in 2008, graduated with a Bachelor of Arts degree in anthropology and sociology from Florida International University.

== Good Morning America and GMA Weekend ==
Benitez hosted a GMA "United States of Breakfast" cooking competition in Boston between chefs Solomon Sidell and Robin Sidell. He reported live from Quincy Market during the summer of 2023.

== Personal life ==
Benitez is openly gay; he became engaged to his partner Tommy DiDario on September 17, 2015, in Paris. They married in a Miami ceremony on April 16, 2016. DiDario is a fitness trainer and Instagram influencer who has also appeared on television shows, including Rachael Ray.

On November 8, 2025, Benitez was received into the Roman Catholic Church through a Confirmation Mass. His husband, DiDario served as his sponsor and Father James Martin participated.
