= Primetime (American TV program) =

American news magazine television program (1989-2012)

- Created by: Roone Arledge
- Presented by: Diane Sawyer; Sam Donaldson
- Composer: Bill Conti
- Country of origin: United States
- Original language: English
- No. of seasons: 23

Production
- Production locations: ABC News Headquarters, New York, New York
- Camera setup: Multi-camera
- Running time: 60 minutes
- Production company: ABC News Productions

Original release
- Network: ABC
- Release: August 3, 1989 – May 18, 2012

Primetime was an American news magazine television program that debuted on ABC in 1989 with co-hosts Sam Donaldson and Diane Sawyer and originally had the title Primetime Live. The program's final episode aired May 18, 2012.

== History ==
=== Early history ===
Originally, the program aired live on the ABC network and featured a live studio audience. The first interviews included Roseanne Barr and a piece on a Middle East hostage crisis reported by Chris Wallace. Donaldson and Sawyer would allow audience members to comment on the program and ask questions of the guests, who were usually interviewed live via satellite or in studio, a practice that resulted in many technical difficulties and easy satirization on Saturday Night Live. Internal conflicts between Sawyer and Donaldson later led them to be separated, and the audience eliminated. However, the program has always had some live elements when broadcast as Primetime Live, generally consisting of Donaldson reading the opening remarks of packaged stories and the opening title as Primetime... LIVE!. Over time, live interviews were de-emphasized and hidden camera investigations began to occupy more of the schedule.

=== Cancellation and changes ===
In 1998, ABC, in an effort to consolidate all of their news magazines, cancelled Primetime Live and combined it with ABC's other well-known news magazine, 20/20. The move was made to compete more effectively with NBC's Dateline, which ran multiple nights of the week. In 2000, however, ABC relaunched the program. It was renamed Primetime Thursday with Charles Gibson, after they replaced Donaldson.

In 2003, ABC aired a short-lived 2003 continuation of the newsmagazine, 20/20 Downtown, as Primetime Monday.

Beginning in the 2004–2005 season, the show was known once again as Primetime Live. Its pair of co-hosts from the previous four seasons, Charles Gibson and Diane Sawyer, was replaced by the rotating team of Sawyer, David Muir, Chris Cuomo, Cynthia McFadden and John Quiñones. The format shifted back to investigative reporting and a new executive producer, Shelley Ross, was brought on board. On July 21, 2005, the show's title was changed to Primetime.

Beginning in the 2006–2007 television season, the news magazine adopted a subseries format, where multiple episodes would be focused on one topic such as crime and medical mysteries, with no set weekly timeslot. Sawyer departed the program around the time this change in format occurred, though she occasionally anchored special editions of Primetime. David Muir joined as co-anchor in 2007. What Would You Do? has become the most popular sub-series and can be regularly seen on ABC, often with a set timeslot. In 2011 ABC aired a special edition of Primetime: an interview by Diane Sawyer with Jaycee Dugard. In 2012, beginning with the sixth season, the Primetime branding was removed from the What Would You Do? show. It still airs sans branding and is anchored by Quiñones. The branding has not been used by any program or special since this time.

=== Food Lion scandal ===
One hidden-camera investigation, of south-eastern U.S. grocery chain Food Lion, backfired when Food Lion sued ABC. Food Lion sued for trespass and breach of loyalty, claiming that the report was produced under deceptive pre-tenses, and ABC employees hired by Food Lion wearing hidden cameras filmed other Food Lion employees without following proper notification procedures. Food Lion did not sue for libel, as the one-year statute of limitations had already run by the time it received all the footage shot by ABC, and prior to receiving the footage, its attorneys believed it would be difficult to prove that ABC acted with actual malice. A jury awarded Food Lion $5.5 million, but later appeals by ABC to the Fourth Circuit Court of Appeals resulted in the damages reduced to $2.00. This scandal caused significant damage to Food Lion's business operations, leading to the closures of recently opened stores in Texas, Oklahoma, Louisiana, Delaware, and Pennsylvania, affecting their plans for future expansion, all while generating negative media attention and financial losses for the company.

=== Awards ===
- 2005 - Pigasus Award (by James Randi Educational Foundation) for the special "John of God" about "psychic surgeon" João Teixeira

== Formats ==
Formats of Primetime include:

- Primetime Monday: A short-lived 2003 continuation of the newsmagazine 20/20 Downtown.
- Primetime: What Would You Do?: Hidden camera program featuring artificial situations in public and social settings designed to gauge the reaction (or lack thereof) of regular citizens.
- Primetime: Basic Instincts: Followed the same format as What Would You Do?, but in more of a controlled test setting.
- Primetime: Medical Mysteries: Basic format reporting on cases of mysterious ailments.
- Primetime: The Outsiders: Human interest format involving subjects with odd habits or standards of living.
- Primetime: Crime: Branding for episodes revolving around a full criminal case, including arrest, trial and aftermath.
- Primetime: Mind Games: Investigative series revolving around psychology and other studies with heavy skepticism around them, such as magicians and televangelists.
- Primetime: Family Secrets: Summer series revolving around famous family conflicts, both celebrity and criminal.
- Primetime: Would You Fall for That?: Summer series with an emphasis on vulnerability and credulity from the public.
- Primetime: Beyond Belief: A 2011 special five-part series that delved into paranormal and unexplained phenomena.

== Co-anchors and reporters ==
Co-Anchors:

- Sam Donaldson (1989–1998)
- Charles Gibson (2000–2004)
- Diane Sawyer (1989–1998, 2000–2006)
- Chris Cuomo (2003, 2004–2010)
- Cynthia McFadden (2003, 2004–2008)
- David Muir (2007-2008)
- John Quiñones (2003, 2004–2012): correspondent on "What Would You Do?" program
- Elizabeth Vargas (2003, occasionally thereafter)
- Jay Schadler (2003, occasionally thereafter)

Reporters:

- Jay Schadler: contributes reports
- Mary Fulginiti: report on legal and investigative issues primarily for "Primetime"
- Rondi Charleston (former)
- Nick Watt: host of "Would You Fall For That?"

== International broadcasts ==
ABC News programming is shown daily on the 24-hour news network OSN News in MENA Region.

In Australia, the program airs at 2 p.m. Saturdays (Extended Edition) and 1:30 p.m. Thursdays on Sky News Australia.

In Canada, Citytv had rights to the show but only aired it when a limited series was scheduled. Primetime: What Would You Do? is currently on the air airing in simulcast with ABC.

== Ratings ==
The program's highest rated episode was the June 14, 1995 episode. It featured Diane Sawyer interviewing Michael Jackson and Lisa Marie Presley, and the world premiere of Jackson's music video for his latest single, "Scream". The broadcast garnered 60 million viewers. Sawyer's interview was controversial in the journalism industry for her use of pre-taped "persons on the street" to ask the couple questions.

1989–1990: #92, 9.1 million
1990–1991: #60, 9.8 million
1991–1992: #40, 12.4 million
1992–1993: #31, 12.7 million
1993–1994: #17, 14.2 million
1994–1995: #31, 11.7 million
1995–1996: #18, 12.3 million
1996–1997: #15, 11.9 million
1997–1998: #22, 14.2 million
2000–2001: #50, 11.1 million
2001–2002: #49, 10.3 million
2002–2003: #81, 8.5 million
2003–2004: #83, 8.0 million
2004–2005: #95, 7.0 million
2005–2006: #98, 7.1 million
2006–2007: #145, 6.1 million
