= What Would You Do? (2008 TV program) =

Hidden camera television series presented by John Quiñones

- Genre: Hidden camera
- Created by: Chris Whipple
- Presented by: John Quiñones
- Country of origin: United States
- Original language: English
- No. of seasons: 18
- No. of episodes: 164 (+10 specials)

Production
- Executive producers: David Sloan (2008–14, 2020–present); Robert Lange (2009); Chris Whipple (2010); Danielle Rossen (2013–17); Ethan Nelson (2018–present)
- Camera setup: Multi-camera
- Running time: 60 minutes
- Production companies: Lincoln Square Productions (seasons 1–16); ABC News Productions (seasons 1–16); Walt Disney Television Alternative (season 17); ABC News Studios (season 17–present)

Original release
- Network: ABC
- Release: February 26, 2008 – present

Related
- Primetime

What Would You Do? (commonly abbreviated as WWYD, and formerly known as Primetime: What Would You Do?, through the program's fifth season), is an American situational hidden camera television series, which has been broadcast on the American Broadcasting Company (ABC) since February 26, 2008. Created by Chris Whipple, the show (with a social experiment format) follows the reactions of passing strangers, as they encounter conflict or illegal activity in a public setting, unaware that it is all staged, and being recorded with hidden cameras. Throughout all of its seventeen seasons, the show has been hosted by news correspondent John Quiñones.

Appearing periodically on ABC's Primetime from 2005 to 2007, What Would You Do? became an instant success for the ABC network. Following the 2007 writers' strike, ABC ordered the first season of the show. The series was annually renewed for a second, third, fourth, and fifth season. Starting with the sixth season, the show began to feature guest appearances, which included Barbara Corcoran, Howie Mandel, and Meredith Vieira. Following the seventh season, What Would You Do? aired its first Christmas special in its eighth season. This was followed by guest appearances by Daymond John and Pnina Tornai in the show's ninth season, Winnie Harlow in the show's tenth season, and an era without guests in the show's eleventh and twelfth seasons. A 10-year anniversary special was aired in 2017 as the season finale of the thirteenth season, titled "What Would You Do?: Then and Now", featuring scenarios originally aired on Primetime and in season one being remade with the same actors in the same locations. Following the fourteenth and fifteenth seasons of the show, ABC announced that they would air episodes filmed before the COVID-19 pandemic as part of the show's sixteenth season, as well as a special hosted by Gio Benitez as part of the sixteenth season's season finale. In May 2023, ABC renewed the series for a seventeenth season after a three-year hiatus. In May 2024, ABC renewed the series for an eighteenth season.

As of January 8, 2025, 161 episodes of What Would You Do? have aired, including ten specials.

== History ==
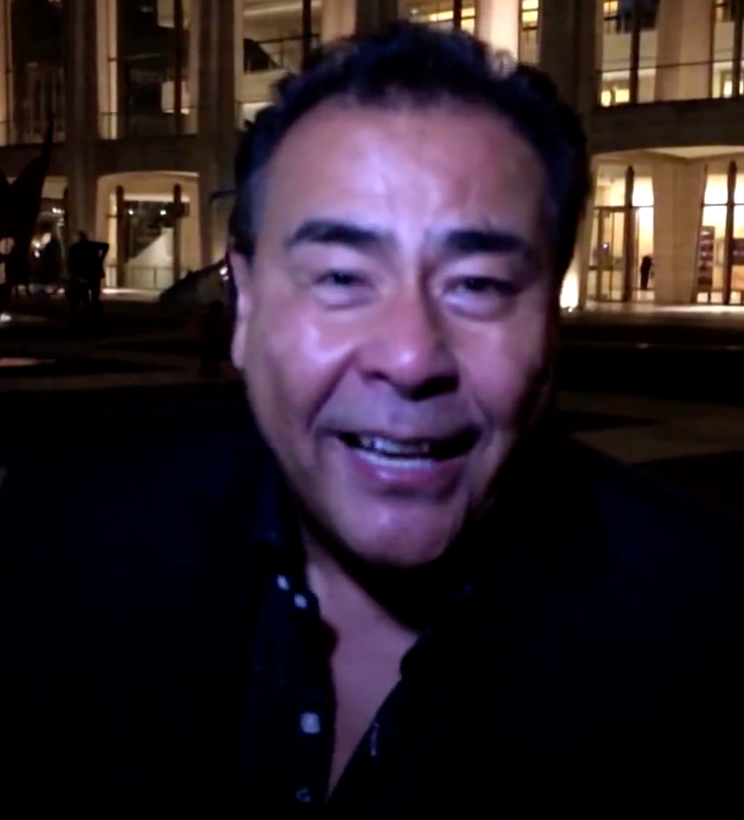
Host John Quiñones

What Would You Do? was conceived as a format-based series for ABC's newsmagazine Primetime, however, all on-air references to the parent program were removed from What Would You Do? following the discontinuation of Primetime as a standalone program by the network in 2010, with subject-based formats of the program, such as Primetime: Family Secrets, airing thereafter during the summer months or as a temporary replacement for entertainment programs canceled during the fall-to-spring television season.

The program features actors acting out scenes of conflict or illegal activity in public settings while hidden cameras record the scene, and the focus is on whether or not bystanders intervene, and how. Variations are usually included, such as changing the genders, the races, or the clothing of the actors performing the scene, to see if bystanders react differently. The situations often pertain to prejudice; race, sex, religious beliefs, physical and mental disabilities, obesity and weight, sexual harassment, vandalism, theft, physical appearance, homelessness, financial trouble, parenting, and social status are common themes. Quiñones appears at the end of each scenario to interview bystanders and witnesses about their reactions.

During some of the segments, psychology professors, teachers, or club members watch and discuss the recorded video with Quiñones, explaining and making inferences about the bystanders' reactions. This and similar formats have been criticized for their design, leading to conclusions about the bystanders that fail to account for other possible explanations for their behavior.

In 2013, a short-lived spinoff titled Would You Fall for That? was aired, with three episodes. Filmed entirely in the state of New York, the show presented a study on human behavior based on hidden camera social experiments performed on complete strangers.

== Episodes ==
Season	Episodes	Originally released		Average viewership (in millions)
Season	Episodes	First released	Last released	Average viewership (in millions)
1	9	January 6, 2009	March 24, 2009	6.8
2	8	May 25, 2010	August 10, 2010	5.7
3	25	October 5, 2010	May 24, 2011	4.9
4	19	January 13, 2012	June 29, 2012	5.0
5	5	September 7, 2012	October 5, 2012	4.9
6	8	May 3, 2013	July 12, 2013	3.6
7	3	December 3, 2013	December 17, 2013	3.0
8	11	May 23, 2014	August 15, 2014	3.5
9	12	May 22, 2015	August 28, 2015	4.8
10	3	January 8, 2016	February 5, 2016	2.4
11	10	June 24, 2016	September 2, 2016	2.8
12	12	June 23, 2017	September 22, 2017	2.5
13	15	May 17, 2018	September 7, 2018	2.3
14	5	August 9, 2019	September 6, 2019	2.1
15	10	July 7, 2020	September 15, 2020	2.4
16	8	February 18, 2024	April 21, 2024	1.8
17	17	October 7, 2024	December 2, 2025	1.6
18	TBA	TBA	TBA	N/A

Important: The average viewership numbers are estimates, not official season averages.

=== Season 1 (2008) ===
Season 1
No. overall	Title	Original release date	U.S. viewers (millions)
1	"Episode 1"	February 26, 2008	7.67
A Muslim woman wearing a veil is denied service at a bakery. At a park, three girls verbally attack another girl. A friend's husband is eating dinner with a complete stranger. A woman parking in a tight spot hits the car behind her.
2	"Episode 2"	March 4, 2008	5.90
Teenagers attack a homeless man. An unhandicapped woman refuses to move her car from a handicapped parking space. A waitress flirts with a woman's husband. Will someone speak up to someone with food in their teeth, toilet paper on their shoes, or an unbuttoned blouse?
3	"Episode 3"	March 11, 2008	7.60
An interracial couple fights in a park. Volunteers are told to read the parable of the Good Samaritan and later see a pair of people in need. A waiter flirts with a man's wife.
4	"Episode 4"	March 25, 2008	9.92
A group of teenagers ridicule an overweight person. Can random people pick a thief from a police lineup? At a wedding, people criticize the bride-to-be's wedding gown. Once again, a friend's husband is eating dinner with a complete stranger.

=== Season 2 (2009) ===
No. overall	Title	Original release date	U.S. viewers (millions)
5	"Episode 1"	January 6, 2009	7.02
A stranger slips a date rape drug in their unsuspecting date's drink. In France, French people react to "obnoxious Americans" visiting the country. At a deli, a cashier blatantly discriminates against multiple Latino customers, including a disguised John Quiñones.
6	"Episode 2"	January 13, 2009	7.30
Once again, a stranger slips a date rape drug in their unsuspecting date's drink. A man takes another person's running pump at a gas station while they're inside the store. A person with an overflowing shopping cart enters an express check-out line. At a grocery store, a young woman allows an elderly woman to skip her in line, only to argue with her when the elderly woman gets a cash prize for being the "five millionth customer."
7	"Episode 3"	January 27, 2009	6.35
At an open house, two women begin to steal items from the house. A senile, confused man wants to drive. Two men crash a wedding. A cashier shortchanges a blind customer.
8	"Episode 4"	February 3, 2009	5.86
A baby is left alone in a car. A mother yells at a nanny. A person is catfished. A dog is left alone in a car.
9	"Episode 5"	February 17, 2009	5.70
A woman tells her friend she wants to marry a man half her age. Once again, an elderly, confused man wants to drive. At an open house, a real estate agent discriminates against an African American couple and later, a Muslim couple. At a park, a young girl is approached by a man who attempts to lure her away.
10	"Episode 6"	February 24, 2009	5.54
A mother with a child attempts to shoplift. People are approached by beggars asking for not money, but gallons of gas. At a restaurant, an obnoxious person begins to talk loudly on the phone. Multiple teenagers trash a car.
11	"Episode 7"	March 10, 2009	5.25
Multiple college students are hazed into drinking staggering amounts of alcohol. A mother criticizes a daughter buying a wedding dress. A woman collapses on a busy street. Will people react differently if a homeless man collapsed? An underage girl is denied a valid prescription for birth control pills.
12	"Episode 8"	March 17, 2009	7.26
At a restaurant, a 65-year-old man with three wives celebrates his impending marriage to his fourth wife, a 15-year-old girl. A group of teenagers verbally and physically attack a Hispanic man. Nineteen aspiring actors agree to say outrageous claims about a product on camera for a few seconds of TV time and a paycheck.
13	"Episode 9"	March 24, 2009	7.96
A store clerk begins to racially profile an African-American customer. A man becomes uncomfortable when a gay couple begins to kiss at a bar. Once again, a person is catfished. A "bounty hunter" tells shoppers at a flea market to help him detain a supposed fugitive mother, by either arresting her, drugging her, or stealing her baby.

=== Season 3 (2010) ===
No. overall	Title	Original release date	U.S. viewers (millions)
14	"Episode 1"	May 7, 2010	5.98
At a bar, a stranger attempts to take an intoxicated, young girl, home with him. A thief is caught stealing a bike. A cashier attempts to steal a customer's winning lottery ticket. A store clerk begins to racially profile a group of African-American teenage customers.
15	"Episode 2"	May 14, 2010	6.03
At a diner, a man yells at a woman with bruises on her arm. A mother stops her vehicle, and tells her kids in the backseat to get out of the car and walk home. A restaurant manager harasses a woman breastfeeding in public.
16	"Episode 3"	May 19, 2010	5.25
A pair of airline pilots drink at a bar before a flight. A customer criticizes a store bagger with Down syndrome. A waiter questions the relationship of a lesbian couple eating at a restaurant with two kids. At a wedding, the bride-to-be begins to give out strict orders, annoying the bridesmaids and the guests.
17	"Episode 4"	May 21, 2010	5.10
A drunk person asks nearby strangers to blow into their car's ignition interlock device to drive home drunk. An angry coach yells at a young soccer player. At a pharmacy, an elderly woman is told her expensive medication is no longer covered by her insurance.

=== Season 4 (2010–2011) ===
No. overall	Title	Original release date	U.S. viewers (millions)
18	"The Best of What Would You Do?"	October 22, 2010	4.04
From season 1: a Muslim woman wearing a veil is denied service at a bakery. From season 2: A stranger slips a date rape drug in their unsuspecting date's drink. A woman collapses on a busy street. A 65-year-old man with three wives celebrates his impending marriage to his fourth wife, a 15-year-old girl.
19	"Episode 1"	October 29, 2010	5.39
A tutor begins to flirt with a student. An anti-military protestor criticizes a young man about to volunteer for duty. A teenager is bullied for being gay. A thief steals a dog.
20	"Episode 2"	November 5, 2010	5.67
A cashier throws out insults and slurs to a Jewish couple. At a bar, a mother with a child begins to drink excessively. Multiple people witness a well-dressed female enter her car and come out dressed as a homeless person, later asking for money. A Muslim girl is criticized by her family for not wearing a veil.
21	"Episode 3"	November 12, 2010	6.09
A teen couple argue in a park. People witness a man perform a fake slip and fall. A shopper criticizes a mother with a child for buying groceries with no nutritional value.
22	"Episode 4"	November 19, 2010	4.96
Two doctors drink at a bar before their shifts. A husband berates his wife for wearing a bikini "too soon" after she has given birth. A mother walks her kids on a leash.
23	"Episode 5"	December 3, 2010	4.88
A drunk teen attempts to drive. A kid comes out as gay in front of his parents. At an ice skating ring, a mother criticizes her daughter for not knowing how to skate.
24	"Episode 6"	December 10, 2010	4.95
A woman places a date rape drug in her date's drink. Two drag queens are criticized at a cafe. At a bar, a pregnant woman begins to drink.
25	"Episode 7"	December 17, 2010	4.38
Viewers' Choice: (Note: On December 10, 2010, one week before the episode aired, ABC announced that they were allowing viewers to vote on their favorite scenarios, for the chance of having them included in the episode. Though that makes this episode a collection of reruns, ABC counted it as its own episode.) At a park, three girls verbally attack another girl. A waiter questions the relationship of a lesbian couple eating at a restaurant with two kids. A baby is left alone in a car. A store clerk begins to racially profile an African-American customer. At a restaurant, an obnoxious person begins to talk loudly on the phone.
26	"Episode 8"	January 7, 2011	5.02
Two EMT's on break do nothing when a woman collapses right in front of them. A shopper accidentally breaks an expensive item and begs others not to tell. Three teenagers dine and dash. Other teenagers yell at an elderly man.
27	"Episode 9"	January 14, 2011	4.97
An elderly woman begins to shoplift. Construction workers harass a woman.
28	"Episode 10"	January 21, 2011	5.12
A waiter criticizes an overweight customer. An interracial couple is harassed at a bar. A woman on food stamps doesn't have enough money for groceries. A kid's parents tell them they can't buy toys meant for the kid's opposite gender.
29	"Episode 11"	January 28, 2011	4.56
At a restaurant, a customer insults a waitress. A manager questions a father with an African-American son and a white daughter.
30	"Episode 12"	February 4, 2011	4.47
A Latino family is racially profiled by an off-duty security guard. At a restaurant, someone steals the waiter's tip. A cafe manager discriminates against two deaf women applying for a job. At a diner, multiple customers witness a "wanted criminal" enter the restaurant.
31	"Episode 13"	February 18, 2011	4.67
Strangers are asked by three teenage boys to purchase them alcohol. A boyfriend tells his girlfriend to buy "sexier" clothing. A person is discriminated against for having AIDS.
32	"Episode 14"	February 22, 2011	4.14
How Would You Do It? Contest: (Note: On December 17, 2010, ABC News announced a contest allowing viewers to come up with their own ideas for WWYD? scenarios, for the chance of having them made and presented on the show, and for a paid roundtrip airfare for two to New York. Three contestants won the grand prize (Jared Smith, Casey Hubelbank, and Amy Saffell) while two contestants (Damen Sterling and Jonathan Gilsdorf) only won the small prize of having their scenario on the show.) A guy tells his pregnant girlfriend to get an abortion. A little person is mocked by fellow shoppers. A father comes out as gay to his son. A woman in a wheelchair is harassed at a supermarket. A boy is bullied for having red hair.
33	"Episode 15"	February 25, 2011	4.68
Two openly gay military servicemen kiss at a diner. A white mother is criticized by her friend for adopting a black daughter. At an internet café, an older woman requests assistance wiring money to someone in another country, unaware she's being scammed.
34	"Episode 16"	March 4, 2011	3.47
Once again, two openly gay military servicemen kiss at a diner. A parent's kid begin to wreak havoc at a diner. A mother tells her daughter to get botox.
35	"Episode 17"	March 11, 2011	4.35
A rude, ill-mannered man enters a gym. A husband flirts with a single woman while his wife's in the bathroom. At a cafe, "mean girls" harass a classmate online.
36	"Episode 18"	March 18, 2011	4.97
Shoppers witness a mother clearly favorite one of her daughters more than the other. Another mother criticizes her daughter for wearing a bikini, saying that it makes her look fat. A woman with a service dog is harassed. At a laundromat, someone starts to steal clothes from someone else's dryer.
37	"Episode 19"	March 25, 2011	4.45
A white child is criticized for wanting to buy a black doll, and later, a black child is criticized for wanting to buy a white doll. A waiter serves food they dropped on the floor. A man calls his wife, who is unaware he's on a date with another woman while the call is taking place. An already-skinny teen model is told to eat less by her agent.
38	"Episode 20"	April 8, 2011	4.49
A man proposes to a woman cheating on him. A woman is denied an application at a health store for being overweight. A young woman attempts to convince an elderly man to add her to his will, suggesting he remove his children from the document.
39	"Episode 21"	April 15, 2011	4.39
A mother advises her overweight daughter to get gastric bypass surgery. An elderly cashier is criticized for a scanner error that wasn't their fault. At a restaurant/bar, a woman celebrates a year of sobriety with her friends, only to order a double vodka once they leave. A store manager fires an employee after a rude shopper fabricates a story.
40	"Episode 22"	April 22, 2011	3.80
A manager criticizes an employee working while pregnant. A man tells his wife to change her looks through cosmetic procedures. An interracial couple meet each others parents, only to receive bigotry after proposing their idea of getting married. People are approached by beggars asking not for money, but gallons of gas.
41	"Episode 23"	May 6, 2011	4.04
On a date with a blind man, a woman lies to the man by saying she's a supermodel. A shopper eats produce while shopping. A job applicant is denied because of their race. A couple yell at a pregnant teen who no longer wants to be their surrogate.
42	"Episode 24"	May 13, 2011	3.55
Based on the book Battle Hymn of the Tiger Mother written by Amy Chua, a "Tiger Mom" scolds her Asian daughter for getting an A− on a math test. A pregnant teen scams adoptive parents into giving her money. A teenage boy asks passing customers to buy him condoms. At a park, a teenage couple begins to argue.
43	"Episode 25"	May 20, 2011	3.94
A gay couple is verbally harassed by their waiter. At a diner, an interracial couple is also harassed. At a salon, a mother tells her daughter to get her eyebrows waxed for an upcoming beauty pageant. A woman getting a manicure/pedicure berates her nail technician. A teenage girl tells her boyfriend she is pregnant, only to be told to get an abortion.

=== Season 5 (2012) ===
No. overall	Title	Original release date	U.S. viewers (millions)
44	"Episode 1"	January 20, 2012	5.86
At a make-up counter, a woman is advised to buy make-up to cover up a birthmark. Two men attempt to scam a restaurant for a free meal by putting a bug in their soup. A drunk dad tells his underage son to drive him home. At a diner, a woman meets with her husband, who kisses another man while she's in the bathroom.
45	"Episode 2"	January 27, 2012	5.17
A man attempts to lure two teenage girls into going home with him. After a man proposes to his boyfriend, a fellow diner voices his disgust and disapproval. A couple attempts to adopt a dog for underground dog fights. At a cafe, a thief steals a laptop.
46	"Episode 3"	February 3, 2012	5.02
A thief steals from a homeless man. A bride-to-be buying a wedding dress is rude to the salesperson. A young child hits his mom.
47	"Episode 4"	February 10, 2012	4.62
A mother asks customers to listen to her baby via her baby monitor while she takes a break. Two vegetarians are told to eat meat. At a make-up counter, a woman is advised to buy make-up to cover up a port-wine stain birthmark on her face. A therapist attempts to "pray away the gay" off a teen.
48	"Episode 5"	February 24, 2012	4.63
A pregnant woman tells her boyfriend that the baby isn't his. A woman carrying an infant smokes a cigarette. A guy peer pressures his girlfriend into getting a tattoo. A nanny belittles the kids she's supposed to be taking care of. A customer over-indulges in free samples.
49	"Episode 6"	March 2, 2012	5.86
A Mormon couple break up when the woman reveals she's not a virgin. A woman shows signs that she's being abused, both verbally and physically, by her boyfriend. A father reacts to his son coming out as gay. A woman steals from a store.
50	"Episode 7"	March 9, 2012	4.21
A young girl is peer pressured into losing her virginity. Two teenage boys discuss drugging their girlfriends to have sex with them. A mother's son tells her he wants to transition.
51	"Episode 8"	March 16, 2012	5.56
A young woman is yelled at by her boss. A young adult with albinism is bullied. A size 14 woman is rudely told by a sales clerk that the store does not have clothes that large.
52	"Episode 9"	March 23, 2012	5.19
Would you tell a woman with a bad haircut at a hair salon that her barber messed up her hair? A sales clerk refuses to sell a wedding dress to a lesbian. Would you pick up a $50 dropped on the ground, or would you return it to its rightful owner?
53	"Episode 10"	March 30, 2012	5.02
A "pageant mom" reveals her young daughter's sexy outfit for an upcoming show. A kid is taunted for having two dads. A child speaks profanity at a store.
54	"Episode 11"	April 6, 2012	4.87
A man needs help changing a tire. At an ice cream shop, a teen has trouble ordering because she stutters.
55	"Episode 12"	April 13, 2012	4.76
Two school students discuss a plan to cheat on the SAT. An autistic child has a meltdown at a restaurant. At a pawn shop, a seller plans to sell a fake item.
56	"Episode 13"	April 20, 2012	4.38
A photographer attempts to lure strangers into his hotel room. Beachgoers are asked to look over an ice chest, only for a thief to attempt to steal its contents. A man attempts to take a drunk girl home with him. A young girl is criticized for not being able to fit in her bikini. Another young girl is peer pressured into drinking.
57	"Episode 14"	April 27, 2012	4.03
A teenage girl is about to send a revealing photo of herself by text to her boyfriend. At a gallery, a woman spills coffee on an expensive painting.
58	"Episode 15"	May 4, 2012	4.69
A father flirts with his son's girlfriend. Two girls are denied admission to a nightclub for being overweight. A customer harasses a waitress who happens to be transgender. A woman plans to skip her birth control pills so she can become pregnant.
59	"Episode 16"	May 11, 2012	4.79
How Would You Do It? Contest: (Note: In 2012, ABC News announced their second annual How Would You Do It? contest, allowing viewers to come up with their own ideas for WWYD? scenarios, for the chance of having them made and presented on the show, and for a paid roundtrip airfare for two to New York. Two contestants (Douglas Roberts and Trena Shines) won the grand prize trip, while three contestants (Patricia Robinson, Melissa Derryberry, and Christina Hauck) only won the small prize of having their scenario featured on the show.) A shopper brings out an excessive amount of coupons at the register. A waitress harasses a mother of eight. A woman's fiance is having an affair with her maid of honor. A pharmacist loudly discloses a customer's private information. A worker at a mail center drops a package, breaking the contents within.
60	"Episode 17"	May 18, 2012	4.33
A mother leaves her children in a store. A lawyer advises his client to "cheat the system."

=== Season 6 (2012) ===
No. overall	Title	Original release date	Guest(s)	U.S. viewers (millions)
61	"Episode 1"	September 14, 2012	Barbara Corcoran	5.31
A job applicant is denied for being female. A waiter refuses to serve a homeless man. A young boy charges customers extra once they buy his lemonade. An entitled girl throws a tantrum at a dress shop. A parent makes their kid wear a sandwich board as a form of punishment.
62	"Episode 2"	September 21, 2012	N/A	4.52
A lifeguard drinks at a bar. A guy walks out of a tanning booth too early. A mother abandons her kids. An artist makes a bad drawing. A bartender is sexually harassed by her boss. A young pregnant woman is drinking at a Jersey Shore bar.
63	"Episode 3"	October 5, 2012	Howie Mandel	4.43
A woman suffering from germophobia enters a supermarket, only to drop her items and be harassed by the store manager (Howie Mandel). A cashier (Howie) tells a shopper to buy healthier items. A mother breastfeeds her child in public. A dad buys his son liquor. A mother and child pickpocket people in a store.
64	"Episode 4"	October 12, 2012	N/A	4.60
A comedian insults his audience. At a bar, two young service men are denied a drink for being under 21. A shopper breaks a bottle of wine. A pale teenage girl is pressured by her mom to get a tan. A mother and child verbally abuse a nanny.
65	"Episode 5"	October 19, 2012	Meredith Vieira	4.73
A test-taker cheats during a Who Wants To Be A Millionaire test audition. A child decides to buy a Halloween costume meant for the opposite gender. A cashier questions a man buying jewelry for his wife, and another woman. A mother forces her daughter to take a restrictive diet.

=== Season 7 (2013) ===
No. overall	Title	Original release date	U.S. viewers (millions)
66	"Episode 1"	May 31, 2013	3.88
A street musician insults people walking on the street. A drunk couple plans to go boating with their child. A father criticizes his transgender daughter wearing a dress. A woman in a wedding dress arrives at a bar, explaining that she's getting cold feet for her upcoming wedding in 15 minutes.
67	"Episode 2"	June 7, 2013	4.14
A woman criticizes another woman giving her a pedicure. A customer orders a complicated drink at a cafe. A barista is rude to customers. A teenage athlete comes out as gay.
68	"Episode 3"	June 14, 2013	3.91
A nanny medicates a young girl to make her go to sleep. A broke woman is given the offer of making fast cash as a "special companion". A Boy Scout comes out as gay.
69	"Episode 4"	June 21, 2013	3.76
A wanted criminal enters a pawn shop. At a restaurant, a customer criticizes their waiter's accent. Three teenage boys dine and dash. A young teen runs away from home. A young boy and girl charge customers extra once they buy his sweet tea.
70	"Episode 5"	June 28, 2013	3.74
Someone takes coins out of a fountain. Visitors at a casino find a wallet. A pastor refuses to marry an interracial couple. A mother is criticized for letting their son get a manicure.
71	"Episode 6"	July 12, 2013	3.86
Once again, a mother is criticized for letting their son get a manicure. For free food at a drive-thru, strangers are asked to do jumping jacks or to sing their order. A lesbian couple is denied a wedding cake because the baker doesn't believe in gay marriage.
72	"Episode 7"	July 19, 2013	3.87
A man searches for open cars and steals from them.

=== Season 8 (2013) ===
No. overall	Title	Original release date	U.S. viewers (millions)
73	"Episode 1"	December 3, 2013	3.25
A woman buys a positive pregnancy test online, in the hopes her boyfriend will propose when she shows it to him. At a diner, a customer eats food off another person's plate. At a barbershop, a black customer is skeptical of having his hair cut by a white man. A woman criticizes an interracial couple. A mother sends her kid outside a diner for a "time out."
74	"Episode 2"	December 10, 2013	3.13
A waitress gets on her phone and stops working. A manager blackmails an illegal immigrant into working. A man on a date is told his credit card has been declined. A yoga instructor disrupts a yoga class by using their phone. A man is verbally, and physically abused by a woman.
75	"What Would You Do?: Holiday Sticky Situations"	December 17, 2013	2.47
A family can't afford a Christmas tree. Kids decide to shoplift after their mom doesn't buy them what they want. Young workers at a hot-cocoa stand attempt to swindle their customers. A mall Santa visits a bar before work.

=== Season 9 (2014) ===
No. overall	Title	Original release date	Guest(s)	U.S. viewers (millions)
76	"Episode 1"	May 23, 2014	Daymond John	5.03
A store clerk begins to racially profile an African-American customer. A teenage athlete coming out as gay is criticized by his coach. A bartender refuses to serve a homeless man.
77	"Episode 2"	May 30, 2014	N/A	4.43
A white female hairstylist flirts with her white male customer, only to find out he has a black girlfriend. Customers are introduced to an absent-minded waiter. A gay couple kiss in public. A thief steals from an unlocked car. A psychic overcharges customers.
78	"Episode 3"	June 6, 2014	N/A	4.55
At a supermarket, a man in a hurry asks to be allowed to skip in line, only to get a cash prize for being the "five millionth customer." Will the customers who let him skip argue? A security guard begins to pull personal items out of a woman's purse. Two college kids spike a girl's drink.
79	"Episode 4"	June 13, 2014	N/A	5.14
Overweight customers are harassed at a buffet. A rude customer leaves money at a diner, only for someone to steal it, and for the rude customer to return looking for his money.
80	"Episode 5"	June 20, 2014	N/A	3.82
A drunk man attempts to weasel himself out of paying off a big bet made while playing pool. A young man is told he shouldn't buy urban clothes because he's white.
81	"Episode 6"	June 27, 2014	N/A	4.62
A thief attempts to steal credit card information. A bridesmaid spills wine on a wedding dress. A nanny tries to calm a child down with medicine.
82	"Episode 7"	July 11, 2014	Pnina Tornai	3.76
At a bridal salon, a groom criticizes his fiance. An un-handicapped woman uses a motorized shopping cart.
83	"Episode 8"	July 18, 2014	N/A	3.67
A nanny verbally abuses a young child.
84	"Episode 9"	July 25, 2014	N/A	3.70
A child draws on a valuable painting at a cafe. Multiple people leave their cars to a drunk valet attendant. Will bystanders say anything?
85	"Episode 10"	August 8, 2014	N/A	3.54
A carnival worker insults multiple contestants. A baby is left alone in a car.

=== Season 10 (2015) ===
No. overall	Title	Original release date	Guest(s)	U.S. viewers (millions)
86	"Episode 1"	May 29, 2015	N/A	4.56
A teenage girl meets a boy she met online, only to realize he's in his mid-40s. A black nanny tells a white child to buy a black doll. A teenage girl is embarrassed when her mother attempts to dress like her. A barista goes through a person's phone. People at a bowling alley are given dirty shoes.
87	"Episode 2"	June 5, 2015	N/A	4.66
A foster mom is mean to her foster son. A white woman is advised to not wear urban clothing. A father forces their son to skateboard down a big ramp. A mother can't afford to buy her son a toy she promised to buy him. An unhygienic ice-cream store employee touches (and even tastes) a customer's ice-cream.
88	"Episode 3"	June 12, 2015	Winnie Harlow	4.64
A worker is rude to a customer with a condition that causes her skin to lose pigment. A teenage boy is peer pressured into drinking a bottle of cough syrup. A couple tells their child they're getting a divorce. A guy breaks up with a girl, making her cry. Instead of making placed orders, a baker presents their own bizarre cakes.
89	"Episode 4"	June 19, 2015	N/A	4.36
A man is discriminated against for being Latino. A couple bring a crying baby inside a restaurant. A man performs a fake slip and fall. A woman at a coffee shop uses a table as a personal desk. A mother allows her kids to behave out of control at a clothing boutique.
90	"Episode 5"	June 26, 2015	N/A	4.01
At a hair salon, a young girl wants to cut her hair short because she "feels like a boy inside." A mom forces a child to play the guitar. A waitress flirts with a woman's boyfriend. Two teenage girls at an ice-cream store bully their friend who is a little less skinny.
91	"Episode 6"	July 10, 2015	N/A	4.04
A young woman asks strangers to pretend to be her boyfriend in front of her mom. A kid bullies their adopted sister. An elderly woman asks strangers for help at a grocery store. A customer pays with money stolen out of the tip jar.
92	"Deep In The Heart of Texas"	July 17, 2015	N/A	4.20
An atheist criticizes a family praying in public. A female customer expresses her disgust for a gay couple kissing at a restaurant. A father attempts to buy his 7-year-old son a gun for his birthday. A military veteran can't afford his groceries. A street musician sings songs describing people passing by in a rude way.
93	"Episode 8"	July 24, 2015	N/A	4.00
An underage person attempts to buy an e-cigarette. Customers are introduced to a clumsy Hibachi chef. A little girl is rude to multiple store workers.
94	"Episode 9"	July 31, 2015	N/A	3.26
At a cafe, a young child plays with their imaginary friend. Customers are introduced to an absent-minded waiter. A pregnant woman decides to give her baby to a gay couple.
95	"Episode 10"	August 7, 2015	N/A	4.06
A woman drinks alcohol while breastfeeding a baby. A wine expert tells customers to drink wine in strange ways.
96	"Episode 11"	August 14, 2015	N/A	3.75
A woman introduces her Middle Eastern boyfriend to her parents. A sales clerk berates a lesbian couple. A shopper damages canned goods for discounts.
97	"Episode 12"	August 28, 2015	N/A	3.98
At a cafe, a customer steals money from a blind patron. A group of teens humiliate a homeless man.

=== Season 11 (2016) ===
No. overall	Title	Original release date	U.S. viewers (millions)
98	"Episode 1"	January 26, 2016	2.59
A woman needs help changing a tire. A teenage boy meets a girl he met online, only to realize she's in her mid-40s. A pregnant woman with two girls reveals to her husband that she's having another girl. A teenager is peer pressured into taking diet pills. A baseball coach buys ice-cream for a baseball team but doesn't buy anything for his own son. Special Guest: Barry Carl as the bystander in the second segment.
99	"The Oregon Trail"	February 2, 2016	2.29
A thief steals a bike. A bartender steals money from a homeless man and tells him to leave the bar. At a park, a man begins to litter. A barista is rude to customers.
100	"Episode 3"	February 9, 2016	2.10
A caregiver takes advantage of a patient with dementia. A potential predator approaches a teenage girl. An athlete is pressured into taking steroids. A customer yells at a barista.

=== Season 12 (2016) ===
No. overall	Title	Original release date	U.S. viewers (millions)
101	"Episode 1"	June 17, 2016	3.81
A customer berates a store bagger with Down syndrome. A mother criticizes her overweight daughter. A mother uses a spray bottle on her kids. A pharmacist loudly discloses a customer's private information. Two teenage boys make fun of a teenage girl playing video games.
102	"Episode 2"	June 24, 2016	3.71
A surrogate mom tells an adoptive couple she's having twins, only to be told that she should get rid of one of the babies. A taxi driver gets drunk before work. A woman yells at her own daughter. A teacher flirts with a student. A teen is peer pressured into binging and purging.
103	"Episode 3"	July 15, 2016	2.69
An employee steals jewelry from the store he works at. Two teenage boys plan to "out" their closeted gay friend online. Two men pressure a recovering alcoholic into drinking. Customers attempt to swap their old shoes with new ones at a shoe store. A black woman at a hair salon is criticized for having a white boyfriend.
104	"Georgia on My Mind"	July 22, 2016	3.15
A man reveals to a friend that he has HIV. A mother can't afford to buy his son the toy she promised to buy him. A pastor attempts to "pray away the gay" off a teen. A woman eats food off of other people's plates at a diner. Two women are denied admission to a night club for being overweight.
105	"Episode 5"	July 29, 2016	3.45
Two teenage boys pressure a teenage girl into taking Adderall for a party. A woman's husband has an affair with another man while she's in the bathroom. A girl introduces to her parents her new boyfriend, who happens to be in a wheelchair. A ventriloquist street performer is rude to people passing by.
106	"Episode 6"	August 26, 2016	3.45
The parents of a white woman disapprove of her Asian boyfriend. A father is having an intimate relationship with his baby's nanny. An elderly woman shoplifts at a store. A father flirts with his son's girlfriend. A husband verbally abuses his wife.
107	"Episode 7"	September 2, 2016	3.59
A mother, who wants her son to play soccer, finds out that he wants to play football. Two young boys ask strangers for a lighter. A teenage boy uses his mother's guilt over her recent divorce to get an expensive pair of shoes. Two un-handicapped people park in a handicapped parking space.
108	"What Would You Do?: Holiday Edition"	December 15, 2016	2.97
Two young girls discuss Santa's skin tone after seeing a black Santa at a restaurant.

=== Season 13 (2017) ===
No. overall	Title	Original release date	Guest(s)	U.S. viewers (millions)
109	"Episode 1"	June 23, 2017	Ashley Graham	4.03
A Muslim teen is bullied by two white peers. A man's parents disapprove of his overweight girlfriend. A man attempts to lure two young teenage girls into going home with him. A bartender's overprotective boyfriend sits at the bar during her shift, keeping an eye on how she interacts with customers. A mother hotsauces her child over a small mistake.
110	"Episode 2"	July 7, 2017	N/A	3.77
A hostess discriminates against a Muslim couple. A thief steals a laptop. A son comes out to his Latino father. Customers discriminate against a Hispanic waiter.
111	"Episode 3"	July 14, 2017	N/A	3.25
A foster mom is mean to her foster daughter. A father is mean to his daughter. A son comes out to his Mormon parents. A woman's parents disapprove of her Native American boyfriend. At a diner, a customer spills coffee on another customer's laptop.
112	"Episode 4"	July 28, 2017	N/A	3.12
At a toy store, a young boy is criticized by his mother for wanting to buy a doll. A single father introduces his daughter to his new girlfriend. A waiter's obsessive–compulsive disorder upsets multiple people eating at a restaurant.
113	"Episode 5"	August 4, 2017	N/A	3.06
A young girl verbally abuses her nanny. A woman's parents disapprove of her boyfriend, who they perceive as being "low social status." Two teenage boys attempt to sell a teenage girl fake concert tickets for an upcoming show.
114	"Episode 6"	August 11, 2017	N/A	3.06
A man forces his pregnant girlfriend to do exercise. A woman celebrating her 21st birthday is peer pressured into taking 21 shots of tequila.
115	"Episode 7"	August 18, 2017	N/A	3.19
A sales clerk refuses to sell women's clothes to a trans woman. A nail technician discriminates against a woman for being overweight, charging her extra money simply based on her size. A mother shopping with her daughter decides to waste all her money on clothes instead of groceries.
116	"Episode 8"	August 25, 2017	N/A	3.14
A Muslim man attempts to get his passport photo taken, only for the employee to refuse because they feel uncomfortable letting him in and out of the country. A female bartender is sexually harassed by her boss. Two uniformed gay soldiers kiss in public.
117	"Carolina in My Mind"	September 8, 2017	N/A	2.75
A white woman with an adopted black child is harassed. A sales clerk discriminates against a Sikh man. A military veteran can't afford to pay for his groceries. Two women slip a date rape drug into a man's drink. A bartender without manners serves drinks.
118	"Episode 10"	September 15, 2017	N/A	3.01
New male and female recruits for college fraternities and sororities are hazed and humiliated in public. Once again, a sales clerk refuses to sell women's clothes to a trans woman. A Muslim mother and daughter argue over whether of not it is safe to wear a hijab in public. A child with Tourette's syndrome is being bullied.
119	"What Would You Do?: Then and Now"	September 22, 2017	N/A	3.40
The scenarios in this episode are all repeats from the first season, filmed in the same locations with the same actors. Three teenage boys verbally abuse a homeless man. A woman parking in a tight spot hits the car behind her. A cashier discriminates against two Latino customers. A thief steals a women's purse. At a gas station, someone steals gas from another customer when that customer steps away from the pump.

=== Season 14 (2018) ===
No. overall	Title	Original release date	Guest(s)	U.S. viewers (millions)
120	"Episode 1"	May 17, 2018	N/A	2.60
A woman reveals to her parents that she got engaged to another woman. A teenage boy grabs his girlfriend forcefully in public, snatches her smartphone and tries to control what she's doing. A school bus driver drinks before work. A customer criticizes his elderly waiter. A laundromat customer steals clothes from another person's washer.
121	"Episode 2"	May 24, 2018	N/A	3.59
A pair of grandparents berate their grandchildren. A customer criticizes a waitress helping another customer with Down syndrome at a restaurant. A woman insults her bartending boyfriend at a bar, accusing him of flirting. A woman's parents disapprove of her Jewish boyfriend. A businessman attempts to scam two elderly men.
122	"Episode 3"	June 15, 2018	N/A	2.58
A group of young black teenagers sit down for a meal at a restaurant and are asked to prepay for their meal. A mother forces her child to shoplift. A woman at a book store rips pages out of a recipe book without paying. A boy is bullied for wearing hand-me-downs.
123	"Episode 4"	June 22, 2018	N/A	2.65
A white mom criticizes her adopted Hispanic child for speaking Spanish. Customers at a restaurant refuse to tip a lesbian waitress. A man plans to propose to his girlfriend with a fake ring. A woman asks strangers to pretend to be her boss in front of her mom.
124	"Episode 5"	June 29, 2018	Monét X Change	2.72
A waitress is harassed by a customer. Multiple people steal from a tip jar. A drag queen meets with his parents, who become embarrassed upon seeing how he's dressed.
125	"Episode 6"	July 13, 2018	Catelynn Baltierra	2.63
A pregnant teen tells her parents she wants to raise her baby instead of putting it up for adoption. A mother and daughter harass a salesperson. A shopper takes items from other people's carts instead of grabbing them from the shelves. A man in a tuxedo arrives at a bar, explaining that he's getting cold feet for his upcoming wedding in a few hours.
126	"What Would You Do? Goes Hollywood"	July 20, 2018	Chauncey Leopardi	2.68
At a sports memorabilia store, a child attempts to replace his dad's autographed baseball which he smudged. A waiter is criticized for having a stutter. A mother buys her daughter clothing that is too small to motivate her to lose weight. A son tells his mom he wants to study ballet. A trans man and his girlfriend are harassed at a diner.
127	"Episode 8"	July 27, 2018	N/A	2.56
A muscular female trainer is insulted for being too fit. A teen's parents inform him that they're getting a divorce because the father has come out as gay. An uncaring mother lets her children run around in a restaurant, disrupting other customers.
128	"Episode 9"	August 3, 2018	N/A	2.50
A woman of advanced maternal age reveals to her friend that she wants to get pregnant. A white waitress discriminates against a Hispanic couple. A waiter spends his time telling jokes instead of doing his job.
129	"Episode 10"	August 10, 2018	N/A	2.74
At a diner, a man wearing a MAGA hat, (later replaced with an Impeach 45 shirt), is asked to remove it. Two parents criticize their 30-year-old son who is still living at home.
130	"Episode 11"	August 17, 2018	N/A	2.46
A woman using food stamps at a grocery store is a few dollars short. A child is left outside on his own by his parents who are practicing free-range parenting. At a diner, a man tells his traditional Chinese parents that he's gay.
131	"Episode 12"	August 24, 2018	N/A	2.86
A customer criticizes a married gay couple for having an adopted daughter. A mother is condemned for nursing her baby in public.
132	"Episode 13"	September 7, 2018	N/A	2.41
At a diner, a young black football player tells his coach he wants to take a knee during the national anthem at the first game of the season. At a nail salon, a customer steals another customer's engagement ring. A teacher buying school supplies for her students is told her credit card has been denied. A teenager ignores his parents by playing Fortnite.

=== Season 15 (2019) ===
No. overall	Title	Original release date	Guest(s)	U.S. viewers (millions)
133	"Episode 1"	August 9, 2019	Nyle DiMarco	2.47
A deaf person is discriminated against while trying to order food in a restaurant. A white woman thinks that a black male babysitter is suspicious. At a restaurant, a mother can only afford to buy one meal for her entire family. A supermarket bagger lacks basic grocery-packing skills.
134	"Episode 2"	August 16, 2019	N/A	2.29
A family confronts a mother's opioid abuse. A shopper obsessed with selfies takes a picture with an injured man who just fell off a ladder. A military veteran is asked to leave a restaurant for having a service dog. A cashier shames an elderly man for paying with coins. After being rejected for a second date, a man makes his date split the check.
135	"Episode 3"	August 23, 2019	Jazz Jennings	2.62
A mother tells a trans woman not to use the women's bathroom. A wrestling coach forces a teen to cut off his braids at a barbershop. A clumsy shopper repeatedly leaves the checkout line to get one more item. A cafe cashier harasses an illiterate man.
136	"Episode 4"	August 30, 2019	N/A	2.58
A man attempts to lure a drunk woman into getting inside his car. A mother takes photos of her daughter on a gym rowing machine so she can make it seem as if the daughter is on her high school's rowing team. Two teenage boys decide to prank their friend with peanut allergies by adding peanuts to his milkshake. A man is shamed for working at a grocery store. A woman steals money from a man who dropped several wads of cash on the ground.
137	"Episode 5"	September 6, 2019	N/A	2.48
Two white teens bully a black teenage girl and her white male friend. A person who believes in life outside Earth and a nonbeliever argue at a museum. A young woman learns that she was conceived with the help of a sperm donor. A young child takes cash out of her mother's wallet and rips it up.

=== Season 16 (2020) ===
No. overall	Title	Original release date	Guest(s)	U.S. viewers (millions)
138	"Episode 1"	July 7, 2020	N/A	2.89
A black man tells a white man to take off his Confederate jacket. A coffee shop employee gives free food to a homeless man, angering the manager. Two young men talk about sharing risqué photos of one of their exes. A mom tells her son (who is wearing a superhero costume) to stop being childish.
139	"Episode 2"	July 14, 2020	Adam Rippon	2.68
An athlete comes out as gay, but is told to stay in the closet by his coach. A waitress argues with a veteran suffering from a traumatic brain injury. Wanting to reorganize a store, a woman begins to remove items from shelves and throw them on the floor. A father asks his son for gambling money. A woman is criticized for buying discounted goods.
140	"Episode 3"	July 21, 2020	Sara Haines	2.36
A woman is criticized for helping immigrant children instead of American children. A woman reveals she's been suffering from postpartum depression. Two college sorority members reject another with Down syndrome. An old man with a heart condition tells his granddaughter not to worry when they go ziplining.
141	"Episode 4"	July 28, 2020	N/A	3.04
A young woman applying for a job is criticized for not having a secure home address. A woman begins to make stereotypical jokes about her date. At a bar, a man's wife pressures him to drink while he's trying to remain sober. A bride-to-be tells her friend she's no longer her bridesmaid. No one shows up to a kid's birthday party.
142	"Episode 5"	August 4, 2020	N/A	2.13
A school student tells their friend they want to become a sugar baby to pay for college. A woman begins to cry when the dress she wants is not available in her size. Two women criticize a stay-at-home dad. A babysitter brings kids to a bar and begins to drink.
143	"Episode 6"	August 11, 2020	Sutton Foster	2.06
A middle-aged woman applying for a job is denied for being too old. Two women criticize an overweight and an underweight woman at a gym for wearing workout leggings. A shopper criticizes a gay couple for buying football apparel. A mother forces her kids to eat their vegetables at a restaurant.
144	"Episode 7"	August 18, 2020	N/A	1.77
A teenager begs his anti-vax mom to let him get a vaccine. A woman steals money from a cash register when the cashier steps away. A pageant coach is berating her contestant and harshly criticizing her appearance. A child at an alligator farm tells his father he's scared of alligators. An elderly man eats alone at a restaurant after his friend passes away.
145	"Episode 8"	August 25, 2020	Nia Jax	2.17
At a restaurant, a customer rants on why there should be a border wall between the US and Mexico. A group of girls verbally abuse another girl at a park. A woman talks bad about her ex-husband in front of her child. Multiple people fall asleep in public places.
146	"Episode 9"	September 8, 2020	N/A	2.00
A young man comes out to his friends as bisexual. A father shames his daughter for wanting to play baseball. A recently engaged woman shows her new ring to her friend, who becomes appalled at the sight of a small diamond. Two grandmothers embarrass their granddaughters by posing for photos and selfies at a diner.
147	"Would You Lie For Me?"	September 8, 2020	Gio Benitez	1.69
A young boy begs strangers to pose as his karate instructor to fend off bullies. Later, the same kid asks strangers to lie while he attempts to steal a bike. A focus group is encouraged to lie about a product's effectiveness to multiple customers. A married salesman begs strangers to pose as his marriage coach in front of his wife.

=== Season 17 (2024) ===
On May 16, 2023, it was announced that What Would You Do? would be returning to ABC for a new season after a nearly four-year hiatus. The seventeenth season premiered on February 18, 2024 with guest correspondents W. Kamau Bell and Sara Haines.

No. overall	Title	Original release date	U.S. viewers (millions)
148	"Episode 1"	February 18, 2024	2.71
A man confronts his son's teacher after recognizing her from an adult website. A man objects to two Mexican immigrants applying for a job at a café. A woman berates a grocery store employee on his first day on the job. A woman is criticized for breastfeeding at a restaurant. A man secretly takes photos of a woman at a gym and asks if she would like to model for him.
149	"Episode 2"	February 25, 2024	2.67
A bartender refuses to serve a homeless woman. A man asks his fiancée to sign a prenup. A job interviewer tells a black job applicant her naturally curly hair is unprofessional. A young woman tells her boyfriend she's pregnant and they disagree on whether she should get an abortion.
150	"Episode 3"	March 3, 2024	2.94
A pregnant woman is unable to afford her food. A boxing coach pushes his fighter to train even as his condition deteriorates. An out-of-work father is pressured into becoming a drug mule. A person discovers their partner cheating on them after tracking their partner's phone.
151	"Episode 4"	March 17, 2024	2.52
A mother disapproves of her son's black girlfriend. A woman tries to recruit her friend into a pyramid scheme. A father can't afford his daughter's birthday gift. Elsewhere, a mother can't afford her daughter's birthday meal. A woman runs into her ex-boyfriend during her bachelorette party. A teenage influencer tells her mother she doesn't want to be an influencer anymore. Later, the roles are switched, with the teen wanting to be an influencer while her mother disapproves.
152	"Episode 5"	March 24, 2024	2.28
A man spikes his co-worker's drink at a bar. A husband and wife disagree over whether the husband should get a vasectomy. A young woman and an elderly woman each shoplift items from a boutique. A veteran suffers from post-traumatic stress disorder at a bar. A scam artist tries to get a free meal by faking being burned by hot coffee.
153	"Episode 6"	March 31, 2024	2.23
A son confronts his mother for relying on him for money. Later, the roles are reversed. A woman pockets money a grocery store clerk unknowingly dropped on the floor. A girl disagrees with her mother on what to study in college. A mother and father disagree on the amount of screen time their children should have.
154	"Episode 7"	April 7, 2024	2.03
A music manager pressures his client to go back to his hotel room with him. A woman has trouble looking after her mother with Alzheimer's disease. A young man dates an older woman for money.
155	"Episode 8"	April 21, 2024	2.27
A woman asks her husband to open their marriage. Two teenagers pressure their friend into taking pills as part of an internet challenge. A remote worker has a loud conversation with his boss over video call. Later, a woman has a loud video call with her friend at a bar.

=== Season 18 (2024–2025) ===
No. overall	Title	Original release date	Guest(s)	U.S. viewers (millions)
156	"Episode 1"	October 7, 2024	N/A	1.90
A customer berates a Hispanic carwash employee. A woman cheats on her boyfriend with her coworker at the Columbia Metropolitan Airport. A man sells vapes to a high schooler at a mini-golf course. A clothing store manager refuses to hire an applicant based on their body.
157	"Episode 2"	October 16, 2024	N/A	1.53
An employee fakes a workers' comp injury. A mother wants to send her gay child to conversion therapy. A woman pressures her boyfriend to get married so she can obtain a green card. A woman berates a store employee with down syndrome.
158	"Episode 3"	October 23, 2024	N/A	1.36
A stranger attempts to lure a child at a farmer's market. A con artist attempts a slip and fall scam at a diner. A woman tells a teenager to ignore his mother's advice about not doing drugs. A bar patron tries to convince their recovering alcoholic friend to drink.
159	"Episode 4"	October 30, 2024	N/A	1.29
A nanny berates the children in her care. Later, the roles are reversed, with the children refusing to listen to their nanny. A man decides to ghost his date after determining she is catfishing him. A gymfluencer is rude and inconsiderate to other gym patrons. A baby boomer harasses a pair of gay teenagers.
160	"Episode 5"	November 6, 2024	N/A	1.48
A teenager blackmails his girlfriend with deepfake pornography. A thief steals from a blind person at a restaurant. A personal trainer sexually harasses his client. A waitress performs her job poorly.
161	"Episode 6"	January 8, 2025	N/A	1.94
A man fetishizes his Chinese American date. Later, a woman fetishizes her African American date. In a "What Would Kids Do" scenario, the show invites parents to see if their children will intervene when they see one girl bullying another. A man openly berates his girlfriend at a farmer's market. Later, the scenario is replayed with a gay couple. At an airport, a man berates a mother whose baby was crying during their flight.
162	"Episode 7"	January 15, 2025	N/A	2.08
At a casino, an elderly man's jackpot ticket is stolen by his caretaker. A man refuses to accept his elderly airport chauffeur due to his age. Later, the same scenario is played with the traveler refusing to accept a chauffeur because she is a woman. A father urges his son to face his bullies with physical force. A trio of teenagers attempt to set off a bag of fireworks in a mini golf course.
163	"Episode 8"	January 22, 2025	N/A	1.83
A cheerleading captain cuts a cheerleader who is deaf. In another "What Would Kids Do" scenario, children encounter a lost child who has been separated from their parents in a store. A thief steals packages being delivered to a restaurant. A ferry passenger throws trash both on the ground and into the Hudson River. In a related scenario, a woman throws garbage on the ground at a grocery store.
164	"Episode 9"	February 12, 2025	N/A	1.57
A drunk parent prepares to drive their child home. An unlicensed plastic surgeon offers a woman his services. A man asks for money from his elderly mother to gamble with. A coach berates their son during soccer training.
165	"Episode 10"	February 19, 2025	N/A	1.47
A diner questions a couple based on their appearance, believing they are not a good fit for each other. A business owner refuses to let a homeless teenager shelter at his restaurant. A teenager taking care of her kid brother in a store fails to notice when he wanders off. The scenario is later played elsewhere, with the boy walking towards open water while the sister talks to a friend. A graffiti artist spray-paints a wall in public.
166	"Episode 11"	March 5, 2025	N/A	1.29
A stranger attempts to lure a child walking home from school. A rock climber shames their friend over her weight. A struggling mother and her son take excessive food from an all-you-can-eat buffet and put it in Tupperware containers. A brewery employee steals money from a food bank's donation jar.
167	"Episode 12"	March 12, 2025	N/A	1.55
In a "What Would Kids Do" scenario, children witness a woman berate another child's lemonade stand. A man heckles a musician at an open mic. A personal trainer offers his client anabolic steroids. A ferry employee tells a couple they can't show public displays of affection. The scenario is played with a gay male couple and a lesbian couple. This episode has two rerun segments instead of the usual one.
168	"Episode 13"	March 26, 2025	N/A	1.30
A woman realizes she's been catfished when she meets her date. A transgender person is blocked from buying clothes by an employee. A teenager tells her mother she's getting plastic surgery. A waiter shows open disdain for a vegan diner. Later the scenario is played differently, with the vegan being rude towards the waiter.
169	"Episode 14"	April 2, 2025	N/A	1.42
A store manager sexually harasses an employee. A mother forbids her child from accessories that don't fit traditional gender roles. In a related scenario, a grandparent disapproves of their grandchildren being allowed to express themselves beyond gender roles. A bride-to-be tells her friend she's putting a fee to attend her wedding. A man makes fun of his former college classmate for working at a diner.
170	"Episode 15"	April 9, 2025	N/A	1.42
A husband tries to convince his wife to sell photos of her feet online. The scenario is later replayed, with the wife wanting to post photos of her feet and her husband objecting. A pledge is hazed by two fraternity members. Two college students study for their finals by drinking excessive amounts of energy drinks. A mother disagrees with her daughter's decision to use in vitro fertilization for religious reasons. This episode has two rerun segments.
171	"Episode 16"	April 16, 2025	N/A	1.27
At a brewery, a childless DINK couple and a single parent with two kids get into an argument. A thief attempts to steal a laptop after the owner walks away. In a What Would Kids Do scenario, children witness a tutor berating another child who is bad at math. A cosmetologist asks intrusive questions to a mixed race customer.
172	"Episode 17" "Holiday Edition"	December 2, 2025	TBA	N/A
All of the scenarios in this episode were filmed at a Christmas market in Jericho, New York. A couple shames their friend for being single. The scenario is later replayed, replacing the couple with the single woman's aunt. A woman snatches a teddy bear from a boy's hands in a store. The scenario is later replayed the other way around. The woman from the previous scenario attempts to pay for the teddy bear but her card is declined. A couple makes fun of a man with dwarfism. In a related scenario, a child mistakes the man for one of Santa's elves. A man and woman steal from a homeless veteran’s collection bucket. In a What Would Kids Do scenario, children are asked to help another child sing a Christmas carol on stage.

== Ratings ==
What Would You Do? : U.S. viewers per episode (millions)
Audience measurement performed by Nielsen Media Research

=== Season 1 ===
Viewership and ratings per episode of What Would You Do?
No.	Title	Air date	Rating/share (18–49)	Viewers (millions)
1	"Episode 1"	February 26, 2008	2.9/8	7.67
2	"Episode 2"	March 4, 2008	2.1/6	5.90
3	"Episode 3"	March 11, 2008	2.9/8	7.60
4	"Episode 4"	March 25, 2008	3.1/8	9.92

=== Season 2 ===
Viewership and ratings per episode of What Would You Do?
No.	Title	Air date	Rating/share (18–49)	Viewers (millions)
1	"Episode 1"	January 6, 2009	2.7/7	7.02
2	"Episode 2"	January 13, 2009	2.9/8	7.30
3	"Episode 3"	January 27, 2009	2.3/6	6.35
4	"Episode 4"	February 3, 2009	2.3/6	5.86
5	"Episode 5"	February 17, 2009	2.0/6	5.70
6	"Episode 6"	February 24, 2009	1.7/5	5.54
7	"Episode 7"	March 10, 2009	1.9/5	5.25
8	"Episode 8"	March 17, 2009	2.2/6	7.26
9	"Episode 9"	March 24, 2009	2.6/8	7.96

=== Season 3 ===
Viewership and ratings per episode of What Would You Do?
No.	Title	Air date	Rating/share (18–49)	Viewers (millions)
1	"Episode 1"	May 7, 2010	1.9/6	5.98
2	"Episode 2"	May 14, 2010	1.8/6	6.03
3	"Episode 3"	May 19, 2010	2.0/6	5.25
4	"Episode 4"	May 21, 2010	1.8/7	5.10

=== Season 4 ===
Viewership and ratings per episode of What Would You Do?
No.	Title	Air date	Rating/share (18–49)	Viewers (millions)
1	"The Best of What Would You Do?"	October 22, 2010	1.3/4	4.04
2	"Episode 1"	October 29, 2010	1.6/5	5.39
3	"Episode 2"	November 5, 2010	1.7/6	5.67
4	"Episode 3"	November 12, 2010	1.7/6	6.09
5	"Episode 4"	November 19, 2010	1.6/5	4.96
6	"Episode 5"	December 3, 2010	1.4/4	4.88
7	"Episode 6"	December 10, 2010	1.6/4	4.95
8	"Episode 7"	December 17, 2010	1.3/4	4.38
9	"Episode 8"	January 7, 2011	1.6/5	5.02
10	"Episode 9"	January 14, 2011	1.5/5	4.97
11	"Episode 10"	January 21, 2011	1.7/5	5.12
12	"Episode 11"	January 28, 2011	1.3/4	4.56
13	"Episode 12"	February 4, 2011	1.3/4	4.47
14	"Episode 13"	February 18, 2011	1.6/5	4.67
15	"Episode 14"	February 22, 2011	1.4/4	4.14
16	"Episode 15"	February 25, 2011	1.3/4	4.68
17	"Episode 16"	March 4, 2011	1.1/4	3.47
18	"Episode 17"	March 11, 2011	1.4/4	4.35
19	"Episode 18"	March 18, 2011	1.5/5	4.97
20	"Episode 19"	March 25, 2011	1.3/4	4.45
21	"Episode 20"	April 8, 2011	1.4/4	4.49
22	"Episode 21"	April 15, 2011	1.4/4	4.39
23	"Episode 22"	April 22, 2011	1.1/4	3.80
24	"Episode 23"	May 6, 2011	1.2/4	4.04
25	"Episode 24"	May 13, 2011	1.1/4	3.55
26	"Episode 25"	May 20, 2011	1.3/4	3.94

=== Season 5 ===
Viewership and ratings per episode of What Would You Do?
No.	Title	Air date	Rating/share (18–49)	Viewers (millions)
1	"Episode 1"	January 20, 2012	1.6/5	5.86
2	"Episode 2"	January 27, 2012	1.7/5	5.17
3	"Episode 3"	February 3, 2012	1.4/4	5.02
4	"Episode 4"	February 10, 2012	1.5/4	4.62
5	"Episode 5"	February 24, 2012	1.4/4	4.63
6	"Episode 6"	March 2, 2012	1.7/5	5.86
7	"Episode 7"	March 9, 2012	1.2/4	4.21
8	"Episode 8"	March 16, 2012	1.5/5	5.56
9	"Episode 9"	March 23, 2012	1.6/5	5.19
10	"Episode 10"	March 30, 2012	1.5/5	5.02
11	"Episode 11"	April 6, 2012	1.6/5	4.87
12	"Episode 12"	April 13, 2012	1.4/4	4.76
13	"Episode 13"	April 20, 2012	1.3/4	4.38
14	"Episode 14"	April 27, 2012	1.1/4	4.03
15	"Episode 15"	May 4, 2012	1.4/5	4.69
16	"Episode 16"	May 11, 2012	1.6/5	4.79
17	"Episode 17"	May 18, 2012	1.2/4	4.33

=== Season 6 ===
Viewership and ratings per episode of What Would You Do?
No.	Title	Air date	Rating/share (18–49)	Viewers (millions)
1	"Episode 1"	September 14, 2012	1.7/6	5.31
2	"Episode 2"	September 21, 2012	1.5/5	4.52
3	"Episode 3"	October 5, 2012	1.4/5	4.43
4	"Episode 4"	October 12, 2012	1.4/4	4.60
5	"Episode 5"	October 19, 2012	1.5/4	4.73

=== Season 7 ===
Viewership and ratings per episode of What Would You Do?
No.	Title	Air date	Rating/share (18–49)	Viewers (millions)
1	"Episode 1"	May 31, 2013	1.3/4	3.88
2	"Episode 2"	June 7, 2013	1.3/5	4.14
3	"Episode 3"	June 14, 2013	1.2/5	3.91
4	"Episode 4"	June 21, 2013	1.2/4	3.76
5	"Episode 5"	June 28, 2013	1.1/4	3.74
6	"Episode 6"	July 12, 2013	1.1/4	3.86
7	"Episode 7"	July 19, 2013	1.1/4	3.87

=== Season 8 ===
Viewership and ratings per episode of What Would You Do?
No.	Title	Air date	Rating/share (18–49)	Viewers (millions)
1	"Episode 1"	December 3, 2013	1.0/3	3.25
2	"Episode 2"	December 10, 2013	0.9/3	3.13
3	"Episode 3"	December 17, 2013	0.7/3	2.47

=== Season 9 ===
Viewership and ratings per episode of What Would You Do?
No.	Title	Air date	Rating/share (18–49)	Viewers (millions)
1	"Episode 1"	May 23, 2014	1.3/5	5.03
2	"Episode 2"	May 30, 2014	1.2/4	4.43
3	"Episode 3"	June 6, 2014	1.4/5	4.55
4	"Episode 4"	June 13, 2014	1.2/5	5.14
5	"Episode 5"	June 20, 2014	1.0/4	3.82
6	"Episode 6"	June 27, 2014	1.3/5	4.62
7	"Episode 7"	July 11, 2014	1.0/4	3.76
8	"Episode 8"	July 18, 2014	0.9/4	3.67
9	"Episode 9"	July 25, 2014	1.0/4	3.70
10	"Episode 10"	August 8, 2014	0.9/3	3.54

=== Season 10 ===
Viewership and ratings per episode of What Would You Do?
No.	Title	Air date	Rating/share (18–49)	Viewers (millions)
1	"Episode 1"	May 29, 2015	1.3/5	4.56
2	"Episode 2"	June 5, 2015	1.1/4	4.66
3	"Episode 3"	June 12, 2015	1.1/4	4.64
4	"Episode 4"	June 19, 2015	1.0/4	4.36
5	"Episode 5"	June 26, 2015	1.1/4	4.01
6	"Episode 6"	July 10, 2015	1.0/4	4.04
7	"Deep In The Heart of Texas"	July 17, 2015	0.9/4	4.20
8	"Episode 8"	July 24, 2015	1.0/4	4.00
9	"Episode 9"	July 31, 2015	0.8/4	3.26
10	"Episode 10"	August 7, 2015	1.0/4	4.06
11	"Episode 11"	August 14, 2015	0.9/4	3.75
12	"Episode 12"	August 28, 2015	0.8/3	3.98

=== Season 11 ===
Viewership and ratings per episode of What Would You Do?
No.	Title	Air date	Rating/share (18–49)	Viewers (millions)
1	"Episode 1"	January 26, 2016	0.7/2	2.59
2	"The Oregon Trail"	February 2, 2016	0.7/2	2.29
3	"Episode 3"	February 9, 2016	0.6/2	2.10

=== Season 12 ===
Viewership and ratings per episode of What Would You Do?
No.	Title	Air date	Rating/share (18–49)	Viewers (millions)
1	"Episode 1"	June 17, 2016	0.9/4	3.81
2	"Episode 2"	June 24, 2016	0.8/4	3.71
3	"Episode 3"	July 15, 2016	0.6/3	2.69
4	"Georgia on My Mind"	July 22, 2016	0.7/3	3.15
5	"Episode 5"	July 29, 2016	0.8/4	3.45
6	"Episode 6"	August 26, 2016	0.8/4	3.45
7	"Episode 7"	September 2, 2016	0.8/3	3.59
8	"What Would You Do?: Holiday Edition"	December 15, 2016	0.7/3	2.97

=== Season 13 ===
Viewership and ratings per episode of What Would You Do?
No.	Title	Air date	Rating/share (18–49)	Viewers (millions)	DVR (18–49)	DVR viewers (millions)	Total (18–49)	Total viewers (millions)
1	"Episode 1"	June 23, 2017	0.9/4	4.03	TBD	TBD	TBD	TBD
2	"Episode 2"	July 7, 2017	0.8/4	3.77	TBD	TBD	TBD	TBD
3	"Episode 3"	July 14, 2017	0.6/2	3.25	TBD	TBD	TBD	TBD
4	"Episode 4"	July 28, 2017	0.6/3	3.12	TBD	TBD	TBD	TBD
5	"Episode 5"	August 4, 2017	0.7/3	3.06	TBD	TBD	TBD	TBD
6	"Episode 6"	August 11, 2017	0.6/2	3.06	TBD	TBD	TBD	TBD
7	"Episode 7"	August 18, 2017	0.7/3	3.19	TBD	TBD	TBD	TBD
8	"Episode 8"	August 25, 2017	0.6/2	3.14	0.1	0.33	0.7	3.46^{1}
9	"Carolina in My Mind"	September 8, 2017	0.6/2	2.75	0.1	0.26	0.7	3.02^{1}
10	"Episode 10"	September 15, 2017	0.6/2	3.01	0.1	0.31	0.7	3.32^{1}
11	"What Would You Do?: Then and Now"	September 22, 2017	0.7/3	3.40	0.1	0.27	0.8	3.67^{1}

^1 Live +7 ratings were not available, so Live +3 ratings have been used instead.

=== Season 14 ===
Viewership and ratings per episode of What Would You Do?
No.	Title	Air date	Rating/share (18–49)	Viewers (millions)	DVR (18–49)	DVR viewers (millions)	Total (18–49)	Total viewers (millions)
1	"Episode 1"	May 17, 2018	0.6/3	2.60	TBD	TBD	TBD	TBD
2	"Episode 2"	May 24, 2018	0.8/4	3.59	0.1	0.38	0.9	3.94
3	"Episode 3"	June 15, 2018	0.5/2	2.58	0.1	0.40	0.6	2.98
4	"Episode 4"	June 22, 2018	0.5/2	2.65	0.1	0.43	0.6	3.07
5	"Episode 5"	June 29, 2018	0.5/2	2.72	0.1	0.44	0.6	3.16
6	"Episode 6"	July 13, 2018	0.5/2	2.63	0.1	0.39	0.6	3.02
7	"What Would You Do? Goes Hollywood"	July 20, 2018	0.5/2	2.68	0.1	0.47	0.7	3.14
8	"Episode 8"	July 27, 2018	0.5/2	2.56	0.1	0.37	0.6	2.93
9	"Episode 9"	August 3, 2018	0.4/2	2.50	0.1	0.35	0.5	2.84
10	"Episode 10"	August 10, 2018	0.5/2	2.74	0.1	0.40	0.7	3.13
11	"Episode 11"	August 17, 2018	0.5/2	2.46	0.1	0.31	0.5	2.72
12	"Episode 12"	August 24, 2018	0.5/2	2.86	0.1	0.34	0.6	2.97
13	"Episode 13"	September 7, 2018	0.4/2	2.41	0.1	0.29	0.5	2.70

=== Season 15 ===
Viewership and ratings per episode of What Would You Do?
No.	Title	Air date	Rating/share (18–49)	Viewers (millions)	DVR (18–49)	DVR viewers (millions)	Total (18–49)	Total viewers (millions)
1	"Episode 1"	August 9, 2019	0.5/2	2.47	0.1	0.56	0.6	3.03
2	"Episode 2"	August 16, 2019	0.4/2	2.29	0.1	0.50	0.5	2.80
3	"Episode 3"	August 23, 2019	0.4/2	2.62	0.1	0.51	0.6	3.15
4	"Episode 4"	August 30, 2019	0.4/2	2.58	0.1	0.42	0.5	3.00
5	"Episode 5"	September 6, 2019	0.4/2	2.48	0.1	0.41	0.5	2.88

=== Season 16 ===
Viewership and ratings per episode of What Would You Do?
No.	Title	Air date	Rating/share (18–49)	Viewers (millions)	DVR (18–49)	DVR viewers (millions)	Total (18–49)	Total viewers (millions)
1	"Episode 1"	July 7, 2020	0.4/2	2.89	0.2	0.79	0.6	3.68
2	"Episode 2"	July 14, 2020	0.4/2	2.68	0.1	0.64	0.5	3.31
3	"Episode 3"	July 21, 2020	0.3/2	2.36	0.1	0.67	0.5	3.03
4	"Episode 4"	July 28, 2020	0.5/3	3.04	0.1	0.39	0.6	3.43
5	"Episode 5"	August 4, 2020	0.4/2	2.13	0.1	0.53	0.5	2.67
6	"Episode 6"	August 11, 2020	0.4/2	2.06	0.1	0.63	0.5	2.69
7	"Episode 7"	August 18, 2020	0.3/1	1.77	0.1	0.45	0.4	2.22
8	"Episode 8"	August 25, 2020	0.4/2	2.17	—N/a	—N/a	—N/a	—N/a
9	"Episode 9"	September 8, 2020	0.3/2	2.00	—N/a	—N/a	—N/a	—N/a
10	"Would You Lie For Me?"	September 8, 2020	0.3/2	1.69	—N/a	—N/a	—N/a	—N/a

=== Season 17 ===
Viewership and ratings per episode of What Would You Do?
No.	Title	Air date	Rating/share (18–49)	Viewers (millions)	DVR (18–49)	DVR viewers (millions)	Total (18–49)	Total viewers (millions)
1	"Episode 1"	February 18, 2024	0.3/4	2.78	—N/a	—N/a	—N/a	—N/a

== Syndication ==
Reruns of older What Would You Do? episodes began airing on the Oprah Winfrey Network (OWN) on February 15, 2011, under the title What Would You Do?: OWN Edition. Reruns of the program began airing on HLN in 2012 as part of the cable news channel's primetime schedule. In the United States, the show has been broadcast on A&E since 2015.
