= Pnina Tornai =

Israeli fashion designer and reality television personality

- פנינה טורנה
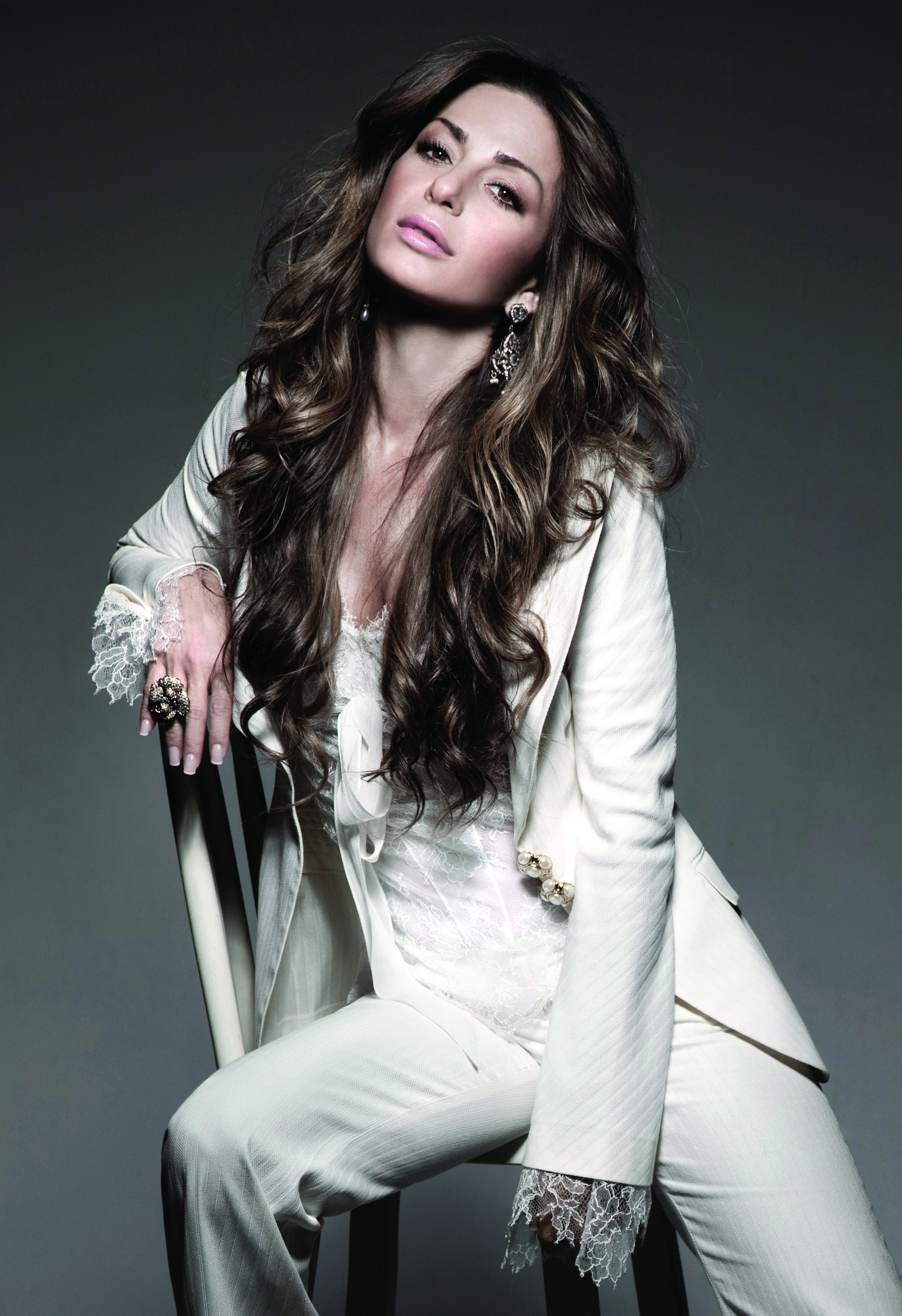
- Tornai in 2008
- Born: November 25, 1962 (age 63); Ramat HaSharon, Israel
- Occupations: Fashion designer, reality and daytime television personality
- Known for: Starring on TLC's Say Yes to the Dress and on American daytime television
- Height: 1.54 m (5 ft 1 in)
- Children: 1
- Website: pninatornai.com

Pnina Tornai (Hebrew: פנינה טורנה; born November 25, 1962) is an Israeli fashion and wedding dress designer, reality and daytime TV personality. Tornai and her wedding gowns have appeared on TLC's reality television show Say Yes to the Dress. Tornai's dresses have been top sellers at Kleinfeld Bridal.

== Personal life ==
Pnina Tornai was born in Ramat HaSharon, Israel, to Mizrahi Jewish parents Shaul and Ruth Assis; she is the eldest of four girls. At birth, Tornai was given her grandmother's name, Pearl. In Hebrew, Pearl translates to Pnina, thus she was called Pnina. Her father was an Israeli diplomat from Alexandria, Egypt, and her mother was from Tangier, Morocco. As a child, Tornai dreamed of being an actress, but instead went on to finish her high school education. Upon graduating, she enlisted in Israel's mandatory military service. Once she completed her military service Tornai decided to pursue her acting career by enrolling in acting school in Paris, France. There she married and had her son, David.

In addition to a decade of her guest appearances and television specials for the long-running Say Yes to the Dress Tornai stars in several other television shows internationally including 10 Years Younger. She has also contributed to segments on ABC News Good Morning America, on What Would You Do? and on VH1.

Tornai appeared on the Israeli version of the reality television show Big Brother VIP in 2009. She is also a gourmet cook and appeared on the reality TV show MasterChef VIP in 2015. Tornai has a love for entertaining, she is an avid gardener and a collector of vintage couture fashion - a passion she developed while living in Paris for ten years.

== Career ==
After Tornai's time in Paris, she returned to Israel with her son. She opened a small store in Tel Aviv, with only one seamstress to help her. The two began creating day and evening gowns. Tornai began making wedding dresses in 1992, when a woman asked if she could make her a wedding dress that mirrored an evening gown that she had seen in the shop window. Tornai accepted the challenge, and when the woman got married, the photo of their wedding made the front page of an Israeli newspaper. When other brides-to-be saw the picture, they came to Tornai asking if she could replicate the dress, which then launched her career. Tornai turned her store into a wedding dress salon.

In 2005, Tornai first showed her dresses to Kleinfeld Bridal, but her designs were initially rejected by the famous bridal salon for being too sexy. Tornai did not give up, and slightly altered her dresses and returned a while later. When she returned, one of her dresses caught the eye of many, and she soon became one of Kleinfeld's wedding dress designers. A Pnina Tornai bridal boutique was then opened in-store for Tornai's dresses. After only two years she became the store's top vendor. Tornai is the only designer to have her own boutique within Kleinfeld. Women from all over the world travelled to meet with Tornai at her boutique inside Kleinfeld, New York.

Tornai now spends two weeks out of every month in New York City, where she meets with clients to help make the dress of their dreams and also holds monthly trunk shows. Although she has hired seamstresses since the start, she still has a say in every dress that is sold. Along with visiting the New York City store, she spends the rest of her time traveling and visiting her other stores. Her creations are sold around the world, including the United States, Canada, Bahamas, Israel, Italy, Greece, Germany, Croatia, Angola, South Korea, and China.

Much of Tornai's design inspiration comes from her travels to exotic places where she takes in new cultures and beautiful surroundings, and is able to "see things differently, as though I am experiencing them for the very first time."

Tornai includes her family in her business; her husband, David Levinshtein, is her business manager; her sister, Kochav, is her makeup artist; and her son is her graphic designer.

== Retail ==
Tornai creates dresses while she is dreaming. She works hard to bring out the "inner princess" in every bride, which inspires the fabrics she uses and her designs. After she completes the designs, her ultra-feminine wedding gowns are hand sewn using fabrics directly imported from Europe. Tornai's signature body-hugging corsets are embellished with Swarovski crystals and precious stones. According to The New York Times, Tornai's dresses are considered "vixenish". Her passion for design was inspired by her Moroccan mother and Egyptian father who exposed her to elaborate cultural ceremonies and celebrations from a young age. Her love for beauty and intricate details grew into a desire to create gowns that reflected her unique heritage and today she has a line of dresses that are specialized for religious Jewish and Muslim brides.

The Pnina Tornai product line has expanded to include footwear, accessories, headpieces, jewelry and fragrance, all befitting the brand's couture aesthetic . She recently added evening gowns to her collection, and also designs kaftans, which closely represents her heritage.

== Collections ==
New collections are shown at international bridal fairs and bridal fashion shows. The lines are also shown in bridal magazines.

Tornai's 2012 collection featured gowns made of silk, satin, lace and were topped with pearls and jewels. Tornai used pearls because she recalled that her late mother and grandmother always wore pearls when they left the house. After the passing of her mother, a friend helped her through her grief by comparing tears to pearls, thus the idea for that collection emerged. The collection was based on tears of joy, which translates to pearls of joy for a bride on her wedding day.

Tornai's 2008 bridal collection was infused with floral designs on the corsets, silk pantsuits, and spaghetti-strapped dress that had scalloped hemlines. All of these dresses were inspired by the love song "La Vie en rose" by Édith Piaf.

== In popular culture and clients ==
Tornai's clients include royalty, celebrities and pop icons. Eva Bryan, NASCAR driver Kurt Busch's wife, sported a Pnina Tornai wedding gown at their wedding. Good Morning America's meteorologist, Ginger Zee said "I do" to her NBC News correspondent fiancé Ben Aaron with a Pnina Tornai dress. Real Housewife and actress NeNe Leakes remarried her husband wearing a Pnina Tornai wedding gown covered in Swarovski crystals. Danielle Deleasa Jonas, celebrated six-year wedding anniversary with her husband Kevin Jonas, a member of the Jonas Brothers, wearing a Pnina Tornai evening dress.

Several movies and television shows have mentioned Tornai's works. Singer Ashanti wore a Pnina Tornai dress on MTV's TRL. Kim Cattrall wore Tornai's wedding dress in the movie Sex and the City 2.

Tornai's gowns have been photographed and featured in publications such as People Magazine, The New York Times Fashion & Style Magazine, Fashion Wire Daily, Women's Wear Daily (WWD) Fashion Magazine, Glamour Magazine, Talking with Tami.

She has been interviewed by The Huffington Post Canada Style Magazine, by Fox News at Fox & Friends TV show, by Fox Business , by Fox News Radio and by ABC News.

Her work has been seen on television in many episodes of TLC's Say Yes to the Dress and on the fifth episode of the Love & Hip Hop Live web series "Yandy & Mendeecees Are Getting Married!" on VH1.
