= Jay Schadler =

American journalist

Jay Schadler is a retired American journalist, news reporter, photographer, and artist. For more than three decades Schadler traveled the world as a correspondent and anchor for ABC News, 20/20, Nightline, Good Morning America, National Geographic TV and others. He is currently a speaker, providing talks about navigating life's transitions with stories from his days on the road.

== Education ==
Schadler is a graduate of Michigan State University. He graduated magna cum laude from the S.I. Newhouse School of Public Communications and also received a Juris Doctor degree from the Syracuse University College of Law.

== Career ==
Schadler worked at WCVB in Boston, Massachusetts and KSTP-TV in Minneapolis and WZZM in Grand Rapids, Michigan. He joined ABC News in June 1982 based in Atlanta, Georgia. He moved to ABC's Boston Bureau in 1985, working for World News Tonight With Peter Jennings.Between 1986 and 1989, he was a contributing correspondent for Nightline, PrimeTime Live, and The Wall Street Journal Report and The AIDS Quarterly With Peter Jennings on PBS.

He became a full-time correspondent with ABC News Primetime in December 1989. He was nominated for an Emmy Award for ABC News and PrimeTime in 1994 and 1995, respectively. Originally airing on Primetime, his hitchhiking journeys were called "Looking for America". Over five years, Schadler hitchhiked nearly 20,000 miles across America, interviewing and recording everyday people. "Looking for America" was nominated for an Emmy Award in 1997. Schadler's "Looking for America" segments helped pioneer the use of small video cameras and dash cams in cars, Schadler's hitchhiking stories are often cited as forerunners to the reality television explosion.

Later, with his longtime producer and friend, Robert Campos, the adventures continued under the name Talelights for the Bravo. In 2000, Oprah Winfrey invited Schadler onto her show along with a handful of the people who picked him up along the road. Winfrey said, "Jay has the eyes of a journalist and the heart of a storyteller."

He was also a correspondent for 20/20. In 2000, he received an Emmy Award for Outstanding Investigative Journalism for a segment on 20/20. Schadler hosted Justice Files, a Discovery Channel series that discussed real-life crime cases and featured commentary by law professor Arthur Miller, as well as reports that originally appeared on various ABC News productions. He retired from ABC News in 2015 to work on other projects.

He is currently a speaker, providing talks about navigating life's transitions with stories from his days on the road.

== Awards ==
- United Press International Outstanding Individual Achievement Award for New England, 1988
- United Press International Outstanding Individual Achievement Award for the United States, 1988
- National Environmental Media Award, 1994
- National Headliner Awards, 1995
- Emmy Award for Outstanding Investigative Journalism, 2000
- 1994, he was awarded the National Environmental Media Award and an Emmy nomination for his ABC News "Day One" investigation on illegal wildlife trade, and the National CINE award for his "PrimeTime Live" profile of small-town America as seen through the camera lenses of a professional photojournalist.
