= Upward Bound =

Federally funded U.S. college readiness program

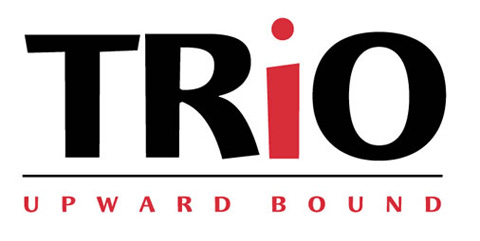
- TRIO Upward Bound logo.
- Formation: August 26, 1965; 61 years ago
- Location: United States
- Website: www2.ed.gov/about/offices/list/ope/trio/index.html

Upward Bound is a federally funded educational program within the United States. The program is one of a cluster of programs now referred to as TRiO, all of which owe their existence to the federal Economic Opportunity Act of 1964 (the War on Poverty Program) and the Higher Education Act of 1965. Upward Bound programs are implemented and monitored by the United States Department of Education. The goal of Upward Bound is to provide certain categories of high school students better opportunities for attending college. The categories of greatest concern are those with low income, those with parents who did not attend college, and those living in rural areas. The program works through individual grants, each of which covers a restricted geographic area and provides services to approximately 59,000 students annually. The program focuses on academic and nonacademic resources and activities like visits to museums or tutoring for school work. Students are encouraged to be involved in Upward Bound for the entire academic year and a 6-week long summer program. Many students who are also granted access into the Upward Bound program are labeled as first generation college students, who are students that are the first in their family to attend college. This program is set in place for students who come from low income families as well as underrepresented schools and gives them an opportunity to excel in college.

== History ==
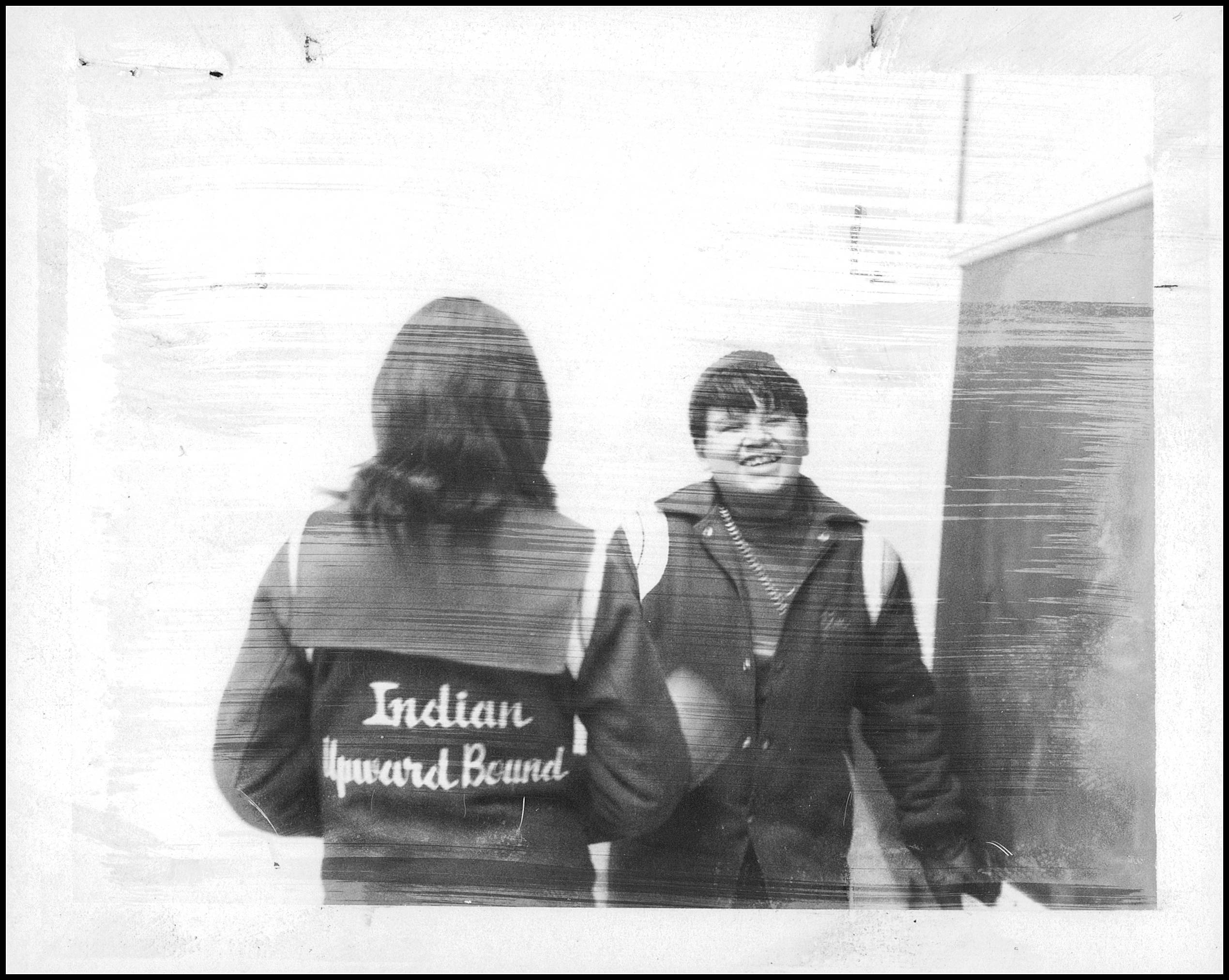
Native American students wearing Upward Bound jackets (1971)

The program was launched in the summer of 1965 after the passage of the Economic Opportunity Act of 1964 (The Federal War on Poverty) during President Lyndon B. Johnson's administration, and was transferred to the Department of Education after the enactment of the Higher Education Act of 1965. The idea of Upward Bound came from Stan Salett, a civil rights organizer, national education policy advisor and one of the creators of the Head Start Program. Led, by C.T. Vivian, VISION informed the development of the fledgling Upward Bound program. Made possible by the Economic Opportunity Act of 1964 and later strengthened by the Higher Education Act of 1965 as part of President Lyndon B. Johnson's "Great Society" initiative, Upward Bound pilot programs operated under the direction of the OEO over the summer of 1965 before officially launching throughout the nation the following year. Like VISION, Upward Bound provides support for students from disadvantaged backgrounds in overcoming barriers to higher education. While the creation of Upward Bound is often attributed to federal employees like Stan Salett and Sargent Shriver, the OEO also sought external input in the program's early stages as Upward Bound took shape. The grant awarded to VISION in August 1965—while Upward Bound was still in its pilot stage—suggests that the OEO liked the model that VISION provided. Vivian often spoke of VISION as the prototype for Upward Bound, recalling conversations with individuals from Johnson's administration and stating, "I was able to get them to send people to every one of the cities and places that we had, that we had our students going." ^{8} The result was a program that looked a great deal like Vivian's VISION.Now under the direction of the U.S. Department of Education, Upward Bound still exists today, continuing to provide crucial support for thousands of low-income and first-generation college applicants each year.The experimental program was established as the country's first federal program to prepare low income students for college with the goal of helping high school students go from poverty to the middle class through higher education. In 1965, 17 Regular Upward Bound programs enrolled 2,601 participants. Since 1964 more than 2 million students have participated in Regular Upward Bound and 964 programs are funded with more than 80,000 students participating. Then in 1990, Upward Bound added an additional program called the Upward Bound Math-Science Program. It specializes in math and science skills for TRiO eligible students to improve their performance and motivation to pursue postsecondary enrollment. The 2017-18 annual data collected by the Department of Education on the Upward Bound Program reveals that currently, 84,934 participants were in the program and being served, this number includes the 13,392 who are in the Upward Bound Math-Science Program.

== Funding ==
Grants are usually made to institutes of higher education (universities), but some awards have been made to other non-profit organizations such as tribal organizations. The Upward Bound Program selects those universities and organizations who receive grant funding based on their competitive criteria: Those applicants who demonstrate a Rationale; Applicants who meet student's social, emotional, and academic needs; and strengthens cross-agency coordination and community engagement to advance systematic change. Upward Bound grants are results-based, with the level of success determined largely from highly structured annual reports compared to grant objectives. As of Fiscal Year 2020, Upward Bound had an annual budget around $352,000,000. Each award made averages $4,691 per participant, with the most common award providing $220,000 per grantee in 2004 and $250,000 in 2007. Awards are for four or five years and are competitive. The law providing for Upward Bound is 34 CFR Ch. VI Pt. 645. As federal education grants, Upward Bound awards fall under EDGAR and OMB Circular A-21 financial guidelines.

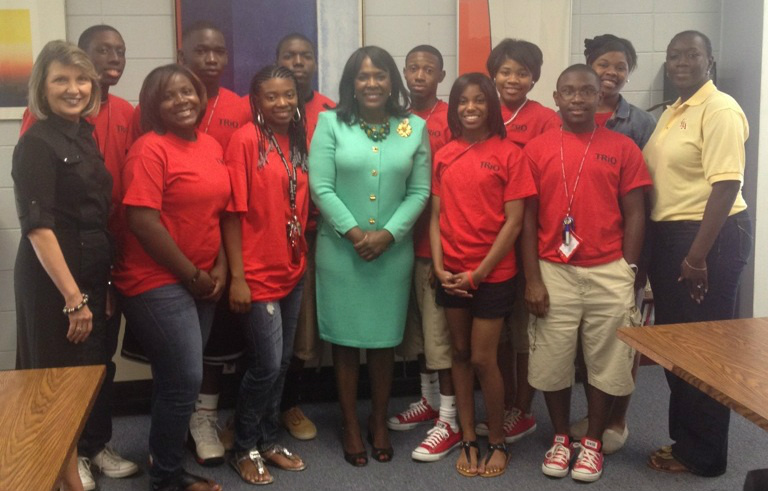
Congressmember Terri Sewell with Upward Bound participants at the University of West Alabama in 2012.

The program is available to students after their eighth grade of school. Two-thirds of selected applicants must be low-income and "potential first-generation college students," with the remaining third of students meeting one of the aforementioned criteria.

== Approach ==
Upward Bound programs may utilize two approaches to student preparation:

1. A summer program where high school students take college preparatory classes and earn work experience at a college campus for four to six weeks. Methodologies vary among summer programs, such as one based on Lancelot Hogben's social usefulness method as applied in the 1980s by an Upward Bound Astronomy program for Los Angeles County high school students, that subsequently evolved into a low-tech and low-cost method by Dr Daniel Barth at Mount San Jacinto College.

2. Weekly academic instruction and possibly tutoring with students throughout the school year. In the latter case, Upward Bound Programs are primarily located at various universities across the United States according to the demographic makeup of the localities served. However, when it comes to the activities and workshops offered many universities share them with community colleges. For example, at East Tennessee State University, located in Johnson City, Tennessee, the school offers students the ability to enter into individual counseling sessions, ACT preparation courses; as well as participate in cultural events, field trips and classes in typical academic subjects. Likewise, at Washington State University, located in Pullman, Washington, the institution offers similar workshops and activities such as: basic academic subjects, SAT & ACT preparation courses, academic advising and tutoring; as well as cultural enrichment activities and individualized support. Furthermore, at the University of Central Florida (UCF), in Orlando, Florida, the school breaks down its Upward Bound Program into three sub-programs, with a great number of activities being offered in all three. These activities and workshops include: tutoring, basic academic classes, study skills, college readiness, cultural events, career exploration assistance, and college admission application assistance, just to name a few. Whatever the location or demographic makeup, the goal across them all is the same: to help better prepare those in high school for academic success at the college level, as well as to get better results on Advanced Placement tests taken while the students taking the exams are still in high school.

== Upward Bound Math-Science Program ==
In 1990, Upward Bound added an additional program called the Upward Bound Math-Science Program. It specializes in math and science skills for TRiO eligible students to improve their performance and motivation to pursue postsecondary enrollment. The Upward Bound Math-Science program (UBMS) was created for students to have the opportunity to excel in the areas of math and science. Upward Bound Math-Science helps strengthen students' math and science skills, particularly those who come from areas that are underdeveloped. UBMS is a program that was put in place by the federal government and was there to provide not so fortunate children with the opportunity to gain knowledge from mathematicians as well as scientists who have experience in these fields. Students are in this program for 6 weeks and have coursework in mathematics and laboratory science, as well as literature. This program provides students with hands-on experience in labs and with fieldwork. The application process for UBMS is identical to that for Upward Bound, however the programs differ in that UBMS is more geared towards students who are interested in the fields of science and technology. UBMS increased the odds of a student taking a science course by raising the percentage from 78 to 88% in chemistry and from 43 to 58% in physics. UMBS has increased the likelihood that children will achieve more in math and science and increase that drive to further their interests in college. UBMS has also raised GPAs in math classes for African-Americans as well as Hispanics.

== Effectiveness ==
Several studies have shown that TRIO Upward Bound is tremendously successful. A study released by the U.S. Department of Education (ED) in 2004, provides a detailed analysis of program demographics. Notable alumni of Upward Bound programs include John Quiñones, Angela Bassett, José M. Hernández, Troy Polamalu, Emmy-winning Journalist Rick Blalock, Kenny Leon, Donna Brazile, Patrick Ewing, Henry Bonilla, Cardi B, LALA Castillo, Raphael Warnock, Oprah Winfrey and Viola Davis. Effectiveness varies from program to program, as local program directors determine the strategy most optimal vis-a-vis the student base, from being very strict and hands-on with students, to being more lenient in terms of student life and academic management. Students enrolled in Upward Bound were shown to be more likely to enroll in a four-year institution than students participating in comparable programs, and were also less likely to enroll in remedial courses. Unique aspects of the Upward Bound program include a summer immersion program conducted on college campuses. The program exposes students to college-level rigor, while also allowing students to enter university courses before high school completion bypassing the need for remedial classes upon beginning postsecondary education.

=== College Readiness ===
According to a study done by Policy and Program Studies Service of the United States Department of Education, in students with lower educational expectations, Upward Bound was shown to increase both enrollment and credits earned at four-year institutions. Repeated participation in Upward Bound until high school graduation was shown to improve educational results such as the rate of four-year college attendance and credits earned at four-year institutions. Students who were enrolled in the Upward Bound program were categorized into distinct groups based on the length of time they participated. The groups were low-duration (1 to 12 months of participation), medium-duration (13 to 24 months of participation) or high-duration (25 or more months of participation), and also as program completers (through graduation) or noncompleters. The results of the observational study showed that an additional year participating in Upward Bound can significantly improve students' motivation and persistence to pursue higher education, apply for financial aid, apply for highly selective 4 year college programs, and complete higher education. Different effects were measured by looking at the data for noncompleters and the impact of completing the program. The rate at which the students would pursue postsecondary enrollment would increase from 74% to 91%. There are confounding variables in this study, mostly due to the characteristic of students who decide to stay involved in the program and therefore have higher educational expectations for themselves. The true effects of an additional year of participation may be lower than the actual findings. The researchers attempted to control for the variable by matching participants with similar characteristics and different duration of participation in the program. The general effect of Upward Bound is only significantly seen in 4-year colleges.

=== Higher Educational Pursuit ===
In an examination of the Educational Longitudinal Study of 2002, collected by the National Center for Education Statistics, researchers found that only 7% of students eligible for federally funded precollege programs enrolled in such programs. They found that participating students were .576 times as likely not to enroll in a four-year institution and .555 times as likely not to enroll in a postsecondary institution of any kind compared to all eligible students. However, Upward Bound students were 31% more likely to drop out of the postsecondary institution in which they enrolled. Though some of the statistics reporting participants' outcome are not optimal, the students participating in Upward Bound are an academically vulnerable population. Therefore, these results do not necessitate that Upward Bound is a deficient program, but that the students may require more support than they receive.

Additionally, research at the Journal of Hispanic Higher Education suggests that Upward Bound programs can specifically help more (otherwise discouraged) Latino students pursue dreams of college. There are low rates of enrollment of Latino students due to discouraging factors like "policies that encourage quick job placement over career development, lack of understanding of the benefits of a college degree, lower expectations for Latino students, poor financial planning, and lack of guidance", but Upward Bound programs should help combat them and support students. The key to these programs' intervention is education and providing students the opportunities that come with a college education. As a result, it would motivate more students to go to college and encourage them that college is attainable. They would also offer more college preparation, guidance in college and help students plan to ensure they not only enroll at an institution but also graduate and find a career. A main drawback of these programs is that many students are unaware that they are available to them. Another one is that these programs should not just aim to get underprivileged students into college but facilitate them finishing. Furthermore, with the Latino population in this country growing, having more educated Latino students could help bring more revenue and benefit society as a whole.

=== Research Complications ===
Another research study done by the University of Wisconsin explains that many studies may have falsely suggested that Upward Bound programs are not meeting their mission of increasing the rate of college enrollment of underprivileged students. The researcher suggests there are actual methodical and analysis errors in other researchers' work and that these programs can close the success attainment gaps between students from different socio-economic statuses.

In response to misleading data being published on the efficacy of Upward Bound and Upward Bound Math and Science programs in 2009, the Pell Institute performed a re-analysis of positive impacts achieved by the programs. Data reported by the Pell Institute shows positive effects found in legislatively mandated programs. Upward Bound students were more likely to receive a bachelor's degree than students receiving no or less thorough supplemental educational services. Of students participating in an Upward Bound program, three-quarters enrolled at a post-secondary educational institution within one year of their projected high school completion, as opposed to less than half of students without access to supplemental college services. One-fifth of Upward Bound students enrolled in post-secondary education completed a degree within six years of their high school graduation date, in contrast with less than one-tenth of students without supplemental services.

== Perceptions & Annual Performance Reports ==
Much like the different approaches to the Upward Bound Programs across the United States, the perceptions of these programs differ as well. When it comes to the perception of how the Upward Bound Program is doing, the most valuable feedback comes from the participants in the program as well as the Parents of those children in the program. While little data exists documenting a collective set of feedback from students and parents about the Upward Bound Program, there is annual individual data from Universities documenting feedback. According to a quantitative and qualitative study of 20 participants of an Upward Bound program at a Midwestern community college, some students mentioned that they did not plan to attend college before they attended the Upward Bound program. Studied students received social and academic preparation and felt they received more social than academic preparation in the program.

=== Pima Community College- Desert Vista Campus ===
Pima Community Colleges Upward Bound Program gathered qualitative data about their program from students, teachers, as well as parents. The students and parents who were in the program, had been though the program, or interacted with the program were positive in their evaluations about the work the program was doing. This group also reported having difficulty when asked to identify ways in which Upward Bound could improve their programming. Amongst the strengths listed by the group were; the program is well-designed and well-organized, the program has unlocked a sense of motivation not only in students but parents as well, and the program was great at keeping parents aware of Upward Bound's expectations.

=== Stark State College ===
At Stark State College they found that students, following COVID Stay at Home Restrictions, voiced their preferences for in-person and hands-on training in STEM activities. Furthermore, they found 77% of students conducting an exit interview from the program rated College Connection tutorial/advising sessions as good or excellent. Several comments from students also stated some sessions felt repetitive and would have liked more fun/games in academic settings. Stark State College concluded that most reviews by students were rated good or excellent with comments mainly suggesting that there were too many learning activities and that they enjoyed field trips taken. When it comes to seniors exiting the program, they mainly rated their experience high and would be willing to come back to mentor high school students currently in the program. When it comes to the Parent Association created for their Upward Bound Program, many parents were involved in the activities and each year serve as chaperones for the student leadership conference(s). Furthermore, parents expressed their gratitude about the program's success and the positive effects it is having on their youth.

=== University of North Carolina at Chapel Hill ===
In a study of parents of students of the University of North Carolina at Chapel Hill's Upward Bound program, the vast majority of parents reported that their children took more challenging classes and received better grades after attending the program. Parents reported that after the program, their children seemed to have better attitudes regarding their own educational attainment. Parents believed the program helped their children to foster personal integrity, self-assuredness, and ambition. Parents also believed that their children exhibited more mature behaviors, such as budgeting money and reliable communication.

=== Annual Performance Reports ===
Annual Performance Reports are a way to gain an insight into how Upward Bound Programs are performing across the country. The reports show expenses they've used as well as the awards and budget they are working with. Most Annual Performance Reports have informative feedback from different levels within the program that helps understand how to improve and show what strengths programs have. Many annual performance reports also contain the number of their students who graduate and obtain higher educational degrees. Many of these annual reports can also serve as a way for who are wanting to get involved with the Upward Bound Program.

== See also ==
- A Space to Grow, a 1968 documentary film about the program
- Upward Bound High School, alternative education program in New York
