= A Space to Grow =

1968 film

- Produced by: Thomas P. Kelly Jr.
- Narrated by: Henry Fonda
- Distributed by: Office of Economic Opportunity
- Release date: 1968
- Country: United States
- Language: English

A Space to Grow is a 1968 American short documentary film produced by Thomas P. Kelly Jr. about Upward Bound programs in Chicago. It was nominated for an Academy Award for Best Documentary Short.

== See also ==
- List of American films of 1968
