= 20/20 (American TV program) =

American television newsmagazine

- Genre: News magazine
- Created by: Roone Arledge
- Presented by: David Muir; Deborah Roberts; (for past anchors, see section)
- Theme music composer: Score Productions (1979–2001); VideoHelper (2001–2004); Transcenders (2004–2006); DreamArtists Studios (since 2009)
- Country of origin: United States
- Original language: English
- No. of seasons: 48
- No. of episodes: 500+

Production
- Executive producer: David Sloan (since 2005)
- Camera setup: Multi-camera
- Running time: 60 minutes (1979–2019); 120 minutes (since 2019)
- Production company: ABC News Productions

Original release
- Network: ABC
- Release: June 6, 1978 – present

20/20 (stylized as 20^{20}) is an American television newsmagazine that has been broadcast on ABC since June 6, 1978. Created by ABC News executive Roone Arledge, the program was designed as a counterpart to CBS's 60 Minutes in that it features in-depth story packages, although it focuses more on human interest stories. The program's name derives from the "20/20" measurement of visual acuity.

The two-hour program has been airing at 9:00 p.m ET for much of the time since it moved to that timeslot from Thursdays in September 1987, though special editions of the program occasionally air on other nights. For most of its history, it was preceded by ABC's two-hour TGIF block of sitcoms.

In 2019, it shifted to a two-hour format highlighting true crime stories and celebrity scandals rather than the traditional investigative journalism associated with newsmagazines, following the same programming direction as CBS's 48 Hours and same-night competitor Dateline NBC. Special edition episodes, however, cover a wide range of topics.

== History ==
The anchors on the premiere telecast of 20/20 were Esquire magazine editor Harold Hayes, who also served as the program's senior producer, and Time art critic Robert Hughes. The program's debut received largely harsh reviews; The New York Times described it as "dizzyingly absurd" and The Washington Post denounced it as "the trashiest stab at candy cane journalism yet." In his autobiography Roone: A Memoir, Roone Arledge recalled that probably the most embarrassing part of that initial program was the Claymation segments featuring caricatures representing then-President Jimmy Carter (singing "Georgia on My Mind") and Walter Cronkite (closing the program intoning his catchphrase, "That's the way it was", spoofing the semi-competing CBS Evening News).

As a result of the scathing reviews reminiscent of another ABC one-episode flop from nine years before, the sketch comedy series Turn-On, serious and drastic changes were immediately made to salvage the program. ABC terminated the contracts of Hayes and Hughes along with original executive producer Bob Shanks, and a then semi-retired Hugh Downs was recruited to take on the role of sole host on the following week's program.

Also featured in the premiere telecast of 20/20, the opening sequence consisted of a pair of eyeglasses, whose lenses showed colored bars, which are often seen in the SMPTE color bars (used when television stations were off the air between sign-off and sign-on). The eyeglasses were keyed over a yellow background, and rotated to its rear position to reveal the 20/20 studio.

With Downs hosting, 20/20 changed into a more standard yet unique newsmagazine and received kinder reviews from critics. The program was originally launched as a summer replacement series; it was then presented on a once-a-month basis during the 1978–79 television season, before being given a regular weekly timeslot on Thursdays at 10:00 p.m. Eastern Time beginning May 31, 1979. Emmy Award–winning producer Bernard I. Cohen began his career with ABC evening news in 1964. From 1979 to 1992, he was a lead producer at 20/20 and helped solidify the program's top Nielsen ratings. Ratings were generally very good during the summer months during its eight years on Thursday nights despite competition from Knots Landing on CBS and Hill Street Blues on NBC. It was around this time that the program started using the Brock Brower–written signoff line "We're in touch, so you be in touch" to end each program, which continues to be used to now (the program also used the line "Around the world and into your home, the stories that touch your life" as the introduction during the program's opening titles for much of the 1990s).

Barbara Walters joined the program in 1979 in a role something less than a co-anchor and soon became a regular special contributor in the fall of 1981. In 1984, she was named as co-anchor and thus Hugh Downs's equal, reuniting a duo who had already anchored together on NBC's Today from 1964 to 1971. The team would remain together on-air for the next 15 years.

In the fall of 1987, 20/20 was moved to Fridays at 10:00 p.m. Eastern, with the TGIF family comedy block as its longtime lead-in; while in that timeslot, it ranked at 21st place in the annual Nielsen ratings by the 1991–92 season. It aired in that same Friday time slot until the fall of 2001, when ABC briefly replaced the program with the scripted family drama series Once and Again, only for 20/20 to return to the lineup again four months later; it has basically retained the timeslot ever since. While the program briefly moved to the 8:00 p.m. timeslot on October 12, 2007, it reverted to its usual time two weeks later.

In the late 1990s, ABC began to expand the show to additional nights. In September 1997, a second weekly edition of 20/20 with Downs and Walters made its debut on Thursday evenings, later moving to Mondays. From September 1998 to September 2000, ABC News chose to consolidate its newsmagazine programs by combining 20/20 and Primetime Live into a singular brand under the 20/20 name and format to compete with Dateline NBC (which itself at the time ran for four nights a week), and having former Primetime Live anchors Sam Donaldson and Diane Sawyer host 20/20 on Wednesday in the former show's old timeslot. Additional nights were also added during this time with various anchors for each broadcast. At its peak, 20/20 ran on Mondays, Wednesdays and Sundays, in addition to its longtime Friday timeslot; these additional nights of 20/20 were joined by the younger-skewing 20/20 Downtown on Thursday nights in October 1999. In September 2000, ABC reinstated Primetime under the title Primetime Thursday, and spun off 20/20 Downtown as a separate newsmagazine simply titled Downtown on Monday evenings. By early 2002, 20/20 once again was airing only in its original Friday timeslot.

On March 3, 1999, Monica Lewinsky, the former White House intern who was infamously revealed to have been involved in an affair with then-President Bill Clinton a few years earlier, was interviewed by Barbara Walters on the program; that particular edition of 20/20 was watched by an estimated 70 million viewers, which ABC stated was a record audience for a news program.

After Downs' retirement in 1999, Walters became the solo anchor of 20/20. This lasted until John Miller was hired as a permanent co-host of the program in 2002; Miller never got very comfortable in the anchor chair, and a year later, he jumped at the chance to rejoin law enforcement. For a few months in early 2003, Barbara Walters temporarily anchored solo again. However, in May of that year, John Stossel – an investigative correspondent for the program who was behind the controversial, though popular, "Give Me a Break" segments – was named as Walters' new co-anchor. As one of the first veteran anchors, Barbara Walters chose to go into semi-retirement as a broadcast journalist in 2004. However, she remained with 20/20 as a frequent contributor to the program. ABC News correspondent Elizabeth Vargas was promoted to the co-anchor position.

On August 25, 2008, 20/20 (alongside ABC World News and Nightline) began broadcasting in high definition, with broadcasts presented in a pillarbox format for viewers with standard-definition television sets watching either through cable or satellite television. The program also introduced a new set and upconverted its existing graphics package to HD.

In September 2009, before the start of its 31st season, John Stossel announced he would leave the program after 28 years to pursue a new weekly show on Fox Business. Barbara Walters and Diane Sawyer also contributed reports. On December 10, 2009, ABC News announced that Good Morning America news anchor Chris Cuomo was promoted to co-host 20/20 alongside Elizabeth Vargas. On January 29, 2013, it was announced that Chris Cuomo would leave ABC News and 20/20 for CNN to co-host the cable network's new morning news program, New Day; on the same day, ABC announced David Muir would join Elizabeth Vargas as the new co-anchor of the program, in addition to continuing as weekend anchor of ABC World News Tonight (a role he retains after being appointed to main anchor of the since-renamed ABC World News Tonight in September 2014).

The program expanded once again on March 2, 2013, with the debut of 20/20 Saturday, which mainly features rebroadcasts of archived stories from previous editions of 20/20 (mainly those dating back as early as 2008) in the same single topic format as the flagship Friday broadcasts. 20/20 Saturday airs outside of college football season, at either 9:00 p.m. as a two-hour broadcast formatted as separate hour-long episodes centered on two different topics or at 10:00 p.m. Eastern Time as an hour-long broadcast, depending on the programs that precede it that given week. Barbara Walters originally served as host of the program until her retirement from regular television broadcasting in May 2014, after which the hosting duties were turned over the anchors of the Friday editions.

On December 22, 2017, Elizabeth Vargas announced that she would be leaving 20/20 and ABC News at the end of May. On April 23, 2018, Good Morning America news anchor Amy Robach was announced to take over as co-anchor alongside Muir in May; she subsequently departed from ABC News (and 20/20 by extension) on January 27, 2023, after the Daily Mail reported the previous November on an affair between her and T.J. Holmes, who co-anchored GMA3: What You Need to Know with her. Meanwhile, Deborah Roberts was named a contributing anchor to 20/20 on October 4, 2022, via a note from ABC News President Kimberly Godwin.

The December 30, 2022 edition of the program was interrupted in the Eastern and Central time zones by news of Barbara Walters's death around 9:30 p.m. ET, and anchor Phil Lipof anchored coverage for 90 minutes with ABC News's official obituary and comment from other ABC News staff about her life and impact.

On December 19, 2024, ABC News aired the documentary Manhunt: Luigi Mangione and the CEO Murder - A Special Edition of 20/20.

=== 20/20 Downtown ===
Unlike most other newsmagazines, 20/20 Downtown was never carried by any big name anchor. An ensemble team of anchors fronted the broadcast, which was aimed at attracting younger viewers, but was hampered by many of the network's larger market network affiliate stations bumping the program to late night or weekend timeslots to accommodate local pre-game shows or coach's shows/highlight recap programming dealing with NFL or college football teams preceding ABC's Monday Night Football. The anchor/reporting duties were filled by the team of Elizabeth Vargas, Cynthia McFadden, Chris Cuomo, Jay Schadler and John Quiñones. The program was renamed Downtown but was canceled in 2002. In 2003, the program returned for one season as Primetime Monday, with the same anchors and format.

=== Special episodes ===
Even though 20/20 still occasionally uses a multiple topic format, the program has seen a gradual shift towards single topic editions since the late 2000s (similar to what has occurred with Dateline NBC since around the same timeframe, although continuing to include a wider range of topics), either in the form of various story packages that relate to the topic or a focus on a single story.

Multiple episodes scheduled the same day without previous notice air under the 20/20 banner involving breaking news stories, either of national or world importance (and usually feature David Muir or a substitute at the World News Tonight desk leading coverage), or air after the verdict of a trial the series has followed as part of its continuing coverage and feature previous reporting and interviews wrapped around verdict coverage.

=== 20/20 Britain's Most Notorious Crime Investigations ===
In July 2026, a six-part spin-off documentary series, 20/20 Britain's Most Notorious Crime Investigations, premiered on Disney+ in the United Kingdom and Ireland and on Disney+ and Hulu in the United States. Each 40-minute episode examines a notable British criminal case through interviews with individuals connected to the investigations and archival material. The series covers the cases of Ben Needham, Joanna Yeates, Ben Field, Peter Tobin, Jane Andrews and Mahek Bukhari.

== Theme music ==
The distinctive theme music to 20/20 from Score Productions was written by Bob Israel (who also co-wrote theme music for now-cancelled fellow ABC series All My Children and One Life to Live) and based upon the longtime Lillian Scheinert-written theme used for ABC World News Tonight. The original theme was revamped around 1993, and was subsequently replaced in 1999, along with the 20/20 logo and the anchor desk on the program's set. Finally the orchestral 20/20 theme was updated in 2001, along with a few modifications in 2003 and 2005. In 2009, the theme was once again revamped, and once more in 2010, along with new graphics to reflect the news magazine's new darker tone; this new theme was written by DreamArtists Studios. In 2012 the theme was revamped, again arranged by DreamArtists Studios.

== On-air staff ==
=== Anchors ===
- David Muir (2013–present)
- Deborah Roberts (2022–present)

=== Correspondents ===
- Juju Chang
- John Quiñones
- Diane Sawyer

=== Former on-air staff ===
==== Anchors ====
- Harold Hayes (1978; deceased)
- Robert Hughes (1978; deceased)
- Hugh Downs (1978–1999; deceased)
- Barbara Walters (1979–2004, 2013–2014; deceased)
- Diane Sawyer (1998–2000)
- Charles Gibson (1998–2000; retired)
- Sam Donaldson (1998–2000; retired)
- Connie Chung (1998–2000)
- Jack Ford (journalist) (2000)
- John Miller (2002–2003)
- John Stossel (2003–2009)
- Elizabeth Vargas (2004–2018)
- Chris Cuomo (2009–2013)
- Amy Robach (2018–2023)

==== Correspondents ====
- Martin Bashir
- Sylvia Chase (1978–1988; deceased)
- Catherine Crier
- Katie Couric
- Arnold Diaz (later at WPIX in New York City; deceased)
- Steve Fox
- Thomas Hoving (1978–1984; deceased)
- Tom Jarriel (1979–2002; deceased)
- Dr. Tim Johnson
- Peter Lance
- John Laurence
- Dave Marash
- Cynthia McFadden (later at NBC News)
- Lisa McRee
- Perri Peltz (1998–2000)
- Stone Phillips (1986–1992)
- Bill Ritter
- Geraldo Rivera (now at NewsNation)
- Brian Ross
- Carl Sagan (deceased)
- Jay Schadler
- Lynn Sherr (1986–2008)
- Sander Vanocur (1978–1991; deceased)
- Chris Wallace (later at CNN)

== Ratings ==
Season	Nielsen ranking	Average viewership
1977–78		N/A (summer)
1978–79		N/A (summer)
1979–80		
1980–81
1981–82
1982–83
1983–84
1984–85	55	13.7 million
1985–86	40	15.5 million
1986–87	43	14.2 million
1987–88	54	12.6 million
1988–89	40	14.1 million
1989–90	44	13.5 million
1990–91	33	13.5 million
1991–92	21	14.4 million
1992–93	12	15.1 million
1993–94	15	14.3 million
1994–95	17	14.0 million
1995–96	11	13.6 million
1996–97	12	12.8 million
1997–98	19	15.0 million
1998–99	22	13.7 million
1999–2000	33	12.2 million
2000–01	44	11.5 million
2001–02	60	9.7 million
2002–03	76	8.8 million
2003–04	58	9.6 million
2004–05	66	8.5 million
2005–06	75	8.0 million
2006–07	106	7.5 million
2007–08	114	6.5 million
2008–09	76	7.0 million
2009–10	77	6.3 million
2010–11	100	5.8 million
2011–12	107	5.6 million
2012–13	83	5.7 million
2013–14		
2014–15		
2015–16		
2016–17		
2017–18		
2018–19	97	4.8 million
2019–20	90	4.4 million
2020-21	72	4.11 million
2021-22	58	4.23 million
2022-23	63	3.87 million

== Syndication ==
True crime–focused episodes of the series air in first-run syndication on Oprah Winfrey Network and Investigation Discovery as 20/20 on OWN/ID.

== Local versions ==
- In the Republic of Ireland, an Irish version of 20/20 launched on TV3 in 1998. The show, which was canceled in 2002, used a mix of reports produced domestically and for the American edition.
- In New Zealand, TVNZ 1 airs an hour-long local version, featuring American-produced stories.

== See also ==
- 48 Hours (TV program)
- Dateline NBC
