= Journal of Hispanic Higher Education =

- Discipline: Education
- Language: English
- Edited by: Esther Elena López-Mulnix

Publication details
- History: 2002-present
- Publisher: SAGE Publications
- Frequency: Quarterly
- Impact factor: 1.000 (2020)

Standard abbreviations
- ISO 4: J. Hisp. High. Educ.

Indexing
- ISSN: 1538-1927
- OCLC no.: 48660300

Links
- Journal homepage; Online access; Online archive

The Journal of Hispanic Higher Education is a peer-reviewed academic journal that publishes papers four times a year in the fields of education and ethnic interests. The journal's editor is Esther Elena López-Mulnix, PhD. It has been in publication since 2002 and is currently published by SAGE Publications.

== Scope ==
The Journal of Hispanic Higher Education is devoted to the advancement of knowledge and understanding of issues at Hispanic-serving institutions. The journal is interdisciplinary and publishes both quantitative and qualitative articles that specifically relate to issues of interest at Hispanic-serving institutions of higher learning worldwide.

== Abstracting and indexing ==
The Journal of Hispanic Higher Education is abstracted and indexed in the following databases:

- Contents Pages in Education
- Educational Administration Abstracts
- Educational Research Abstracts Online
- SCOPUS
- Social Services Abstracts
