= John Quiñones =

American television anchor (born 1952)

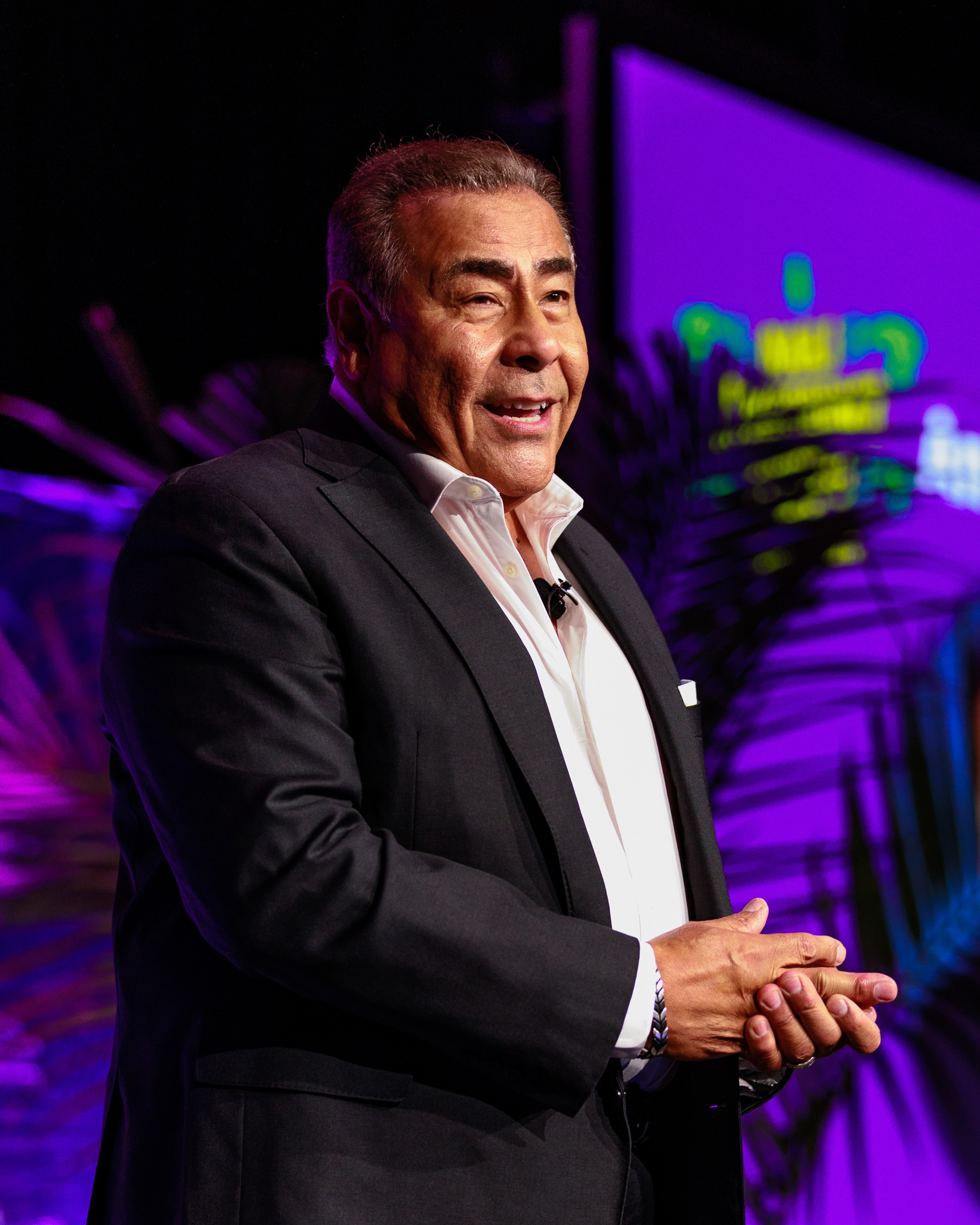
- Quiñones in 2026
- Born: John Manuel Quiñones; May 23, 1952 (age 74); San Antonio, Texas, U.S.
- Education: St. Mary's University (BA); Columbia University (MA)
- Occupations: Journalist, broadcaster, television host
- Years active: 1975–present
- Known for: Host of What Would You Do?
- Spouses: Nancy Loftus (m. 1988; div. 2009) Deanna White (m. 2010)
- Children: 3
- Website: www.johnquinones.com

John Manuel Quiñones (born May 23, 1952) is an American journalist and host. After earning a degree from Columbia University Graduate School of Journalism, he became an ABC News correspondent for 20/20, Nightline and Good Morning America. He gained prominence hosting the show What Would You Do? since 2008. He has received numerous accolades including seven Emmy Awards and a Peabody Award.

== Early life and education ==
John Manuel Quiñones was born in San Antonio, Texas, on May 23, 1952, to Bruno H. Quiñones and Maria Quiñones (née García). He is of Mexican descent.

While attending Brackenridge High School in San Antonio, Quiñones was selected to take part in a federal anti-poverty program, Upward Bound, which prepared inner-city high school students for college. As an undergraduate at St. Mary's University, Quiñones was a member of the Sigma Beta-Zeta chapter of Lambda Chi Alpha fraternity. After graduating from St. Mary's with a Bachelor of Arts degree in speech communication, Quiñones earned a Master of Arts degree from the Columbia University Graduate School of Journalism.

== Career ==
Quiñones is an ABC News correspondent known as the anchor of “What Would You Do?” and “Primetime.”

Quiñones worked as a radio news editor at KTRH in Houston, Texas from 1975 to 1978 and also worked as an anchor and reporter for KPRC-TV. He later reported for WBBM-TV in Chicago. In 1982, Quiñones started as a general assignment correspondent with ABC News based in Miami.

According to communications attorney Mark Lloyd, "Quiñones told the League of United Latin American Citizens (LULAC) audience that he got his start because a San Antonio community organization threatened that if the stations didn't hire more Latinos, the group would go to the FCC (Federal Communications Commission) and challenge their licenses."

He traveled to Cape Canaveral in January 1986 to cover the launch of the Space Shuttle Challenger. Quiñones reported live on the ABC News Special Report that began about 5 minutes after the Space Shuttle Challenger disaster.

== Awards and honors ==
- George Foster Peabody Award, 1999, ABC News, New York, New York, "ABC 2000" (also known as ABC 2000 Today)
- ALMA Award from the National Council of La Raza
- CINE award for his report on suicide bombers in Israel
- Gabriel Award
- 7-time Emmy Award winner
- World Hunger Media Award and a Citation from the Robert F. Kennedy Journalism Award
- Pigasus Award, 2005, ABC's Primetime Live, for its credulous "John of God " special, about Brazilian "psychic surgeon" João Teixeira
- National Hispanic Media Coalition's Lifetime Achievement Award, 2016

== Bibliography ==
- John Quiñones (2009). Heroes Among Us: Ordinary People, Extraordinary Choices. Harper. ISBN 978-0-06-173360-4.
- John Quiñones (2015). What Would You Do?: Words of Wisdom About Doing the Right Thing. Kingswell. ISBN 978-1484726204.
- John Quiñones and María Elena Salinas (2024). One Year in Uvalde: A Story of Hope and Resilience. Hyperion Avenue. ISBN 978-1368107013.
