= Health Education Campus =

Health Education Campus (HEC)
- Interactive map of the Health Education Campus (HEC) area

General information
- Location: 9501 Euclid Avenue, Cleveland, Ohio, United States
- Coordinates: 41°30′16.6″N 81°37′13.4″W
- Groundbreaking: 2015
- Completed: 2019
- Owner: Case Western Reserve University; Cleveland Clinic

Design and construction
- Architecture firm: Foster + Partners
- Designations: LEED-Gold

The Health Education Campus (HEC) is located on the campus of the Cleveland Clinic in Cleveland, Ohio, United States at the border of University Circle and Fairfax (Midtown) neighborhoods in the Health-Tech Corridor, built through a collaboration between Case Western Reserve University and the Cleveland Clinic.

== History and architecture ==
Opened in 2019, the campus consists of two buildings, the Sheila and Eric Samson Pavilion and the Dental Clinic, constructed at a combined price tag of $515 million. The 477,000-square-foot Samson Pavilion was designed by Norman Foster, Baron Foster of Thames Bank of Foster + Partners in London, United Kingdom and earned a LEED-Gold certification.

== Education ==
The campus hosts CWRU medical, dental, nursing, and physician assistant education programs, with the intent of fostering interprofessional health professions education. Previously, most of these programs had previously held classes on the campus of CWRU and University Hospitals Cleveland Medical Center. The move, announced in 2013, was a major contributing factor for University Hospitals to shift its name from University Hospitals Case Medical Center to University Hospitals Cleveland Medical Center in 2016, as well as renegotiate its affiliation agreement with CWRU that same year. Schools with classes at the HEC include:

- Case Western Reserve School of Medicine
- Case Western Reserve School of Dental Medicine
- Cleveland Clinic Lerner College of Medicine (CCLCM)
- Frances Payne Bolton School of Nursing
- Mandel School of Applied Social Sciences

== Non-education uses ==
During the COVID-19 pandemic, the HEC was converted into "Hope Hospital" with 327 low-acuity beds in case of a medical surge. However, the space was never needed for surge capacity, so in July 2020, the temporary hospital was de-constructed so fall classes could resume in the building.

On September 29, 2020, the Samson Pavilion hosted the first of the 2020 Presidential Debates between Donald Trump and Joe Biden, moderated by Chris Wallace. The first presidential debate was originally going to be hosted at the University of Notre Dame, which later withdrew over safety concerns related to the COVID-19 pandemic.
