= CNN+ =

Defunct streaming service by CNN

- Logo

- Screenshot of the CNN+ website
- Website type: OTT video streaming platform
- Available in: English
- Founded: March 29, 2022
- Dissolved: April 28, 2022 (30 days)
- Successors: HBO Max; Discovery+
- Headquarters: US
- Area served: United States
- Owner: Warner Bros. Discovery
- Parent: CNN Worldwide
- Website: plus.cnn.com
- Current status: Discontinued

CNN+ was a short-lived subscription streaming service and online news channel owned by the CNN division of WarnerMedia News & Sports. It was launched on March 29, 2022 and was shut down on April 28, 2022. Designed as an offshoot of the CNN television channel, the service carried a daily lineup of live news programming, as well as original series and documentaries drawn from the channel's library, and an "interactive community". Some of its programming was hosted by existing CNN personalities, while CNN also hired Fox News journalist Chris Wallace to host an interview program for the service.

The launch of CNN+ came amid the merger of WarnerMedia with Discovery Inc. to form Warner Bros. Discovery (WBD), which was completed in early April. On its launch, CNN+ received mixed reviews, while it was reported that fewer than 10,000 people were using CNN+ on a daily basis. On April 21, 2022, new CNN head Chris Licht and WBD's head of streaming J.B. Perrette announced that CNN+ would be discontinued effective April 28, 2022 (only 30 days after its original launch), citing the service as being incompatible with the company's goal of having one streaming service to encompass all WBD properties.

Selected CNN+ original programs were picked up by HBO Max and the main CNN network. After having been removed from HBO Max ahead of the launch of CNN+, CNN's library of factual programs were moved to Discovery+ on August 19, 2022. After the relaunch of HBO Max as Max in 2023, CNN announced that it would attempt another streaming news service—CNN Max—which was launched on Max in late-September 2023.

== History and development ==
On July 19, 2021, CNN announced that they would offer a new round-the-clock streaming service, due to launch in the first quarter of 2022. The plan was for the service to provide eight to 12 hours of live programming a day, complemented by original series created just for the service and others culled from the network's archives, as well as an "interactive community" that would allow viewers to interact with on-air talent. The service was described by CNN head Jeff Zucker as "the evolution of video news and the start of a new era for the company", while the service's chief Andrew Morse described it as the "most important launch" for CNN since its founding in 1980.

Former NBC News correspondent Kasie Hunt was one of the first personalities confirmed to join the service; The Source with Kasie Hunt was announced as the title of her news show. On December 12, 2021, the network announced that Scott Galloway, a New York University professor, joined CNN+ as a contributor to its original live programming. On the same day, Chris Wallace announced that he would join CNN+ after spending 18 years at Fox News, as well as serving as the host of Fox News Sunday.

Throughout the month of January 2022, several CNN cable news anchors, including Kate Bolduan, Wolf Blitzer, Jake Tapper, and Fareed Zakaria, and former NPR host Audie Cornish had joined CNN+ to host original programming shows on the streaming service. That same month, CNN+ announced additional talent hires, including Rex Chapman and Alison Roman, had joined the streaming service.

== Operations ==
The surprise departure of Jeff Zucker in February 2022 had disrupted the long-term vision for CNN+ before it launched. David Zaslav, the CEO of Discovery, Inc., said, "I haven't gotten a business review on what CNN+ is going to be and how it's going to be offered." Zaslav later became CEO of the merged Warner Bros. Discovery; the merger closed shortly after CNN+'s launch date.

CNN+ launched on March 29, 2022. Subscribers who joined in the first month paid $2.99 per month, about a 50% discount from the regular price, and their promotional rate was to have remained valid for the duration of their subscription. More than 100,000 subscribers joined in its first week. The service became available on Roku devices on April 11.

Axios reported CNN spent $300 million to launch the streaming service.

=== Reception ===
CNN+ launched to mixed reviews and low subscriber numbers. Vulture wrote that "While it's far too early to reach any definitive judgments, CNN+ in its formative phase feels somewhat like the Quibi of streaming news: Lots of money has been spent, big stars are onboard, but it's hard to figure out just what the service is supposed to be and why a large number of people will want to pay for it." The reviewer noted that CNN+, despite its standalone subscription fee, did not include any CNN content, either live or on demand. Newsday's media critic Verne Gay gave CNN+ a two-star review (out of four), praising many of its shows and the lack of commercial interruption while wondering about the mythical "unicorn viewer who has no time to eat or sleep" with the time and attention to watch its content. PC Magazine gave CNN+ a 4.0 out of 5 rating, praising its programming and its lack of ads while criticizing its lack of live CNN programming (without a paid cable subscription) and its lack of mobile content downloads. National Review wrote that the channel was a dumping ground for content that "wasn't good enough to run on CNN."

CNN executives originally expected to have two million subscribers in CNN+'s first year and 15–18 million after four years. CNN originally estimated that it would invest $1 billion in CNN+ over its first four years, but after a slow start, Axios reported that "hundreds of millions of dollars are expected to be cut" from that investment.

On April 12, two weeks after its launch, CNBC reported that fewer than 10,000 people were using CNN+ on a daily basis. With the merger of Warner Bros. Discovery having completed four days earlier, CNBC suggested that CNN+ programming might become available as part of a larger bundled offering with HBO Max and Discovery+, each of which have millions of subscribers. Much of the CNN original programming on HBO Max had been removed in advance of the CNN+ launch.

By April 19, CNN+ had about 150,000 subscribers.

=== Shutdown ===
On April 21, 2022, CNN announced that CNN+ would cease operations on April 30. Andrew Morse, who led CNN's digital properties, would also be leaving the company. New CNN head Chris Licht and Discovery's head of streaming and interactive entertainment J.B. Perrette described the service as incompatible with the company's goal of forming a single streaming service to cover all its properties. It was expected that some of CNN+'s original programming would migrate to a combined streaming service housing Warner Bros. Discovery's content or the linear CNN cable television channel. Licht stated that the service's employees would "continue to be paid and receive benefits for the next 90 days to explore opportunities at CNN, CNN Digital, and elsewhere in the Warner Bros. Discovery family" and that departing CNN+ employees would receive at least six months of severance depending on their length of service. All subscribers to CNN+ would receive a pro-rated refund. On April 27, the shutdown was moved up to the next day, and the home page redirected to a help section about the service's whereabouts. CNN+ was the shortest-lived service under the Warner Bros. Discovery/Turner Broadcasting umbrella, breaking the previous record set by the Cable Music Channel, which lasted 35 days between October 26 and November 30, 1984.

During the Warner Bros. Discovery upfronts, it was announced the CNN+ series Who's Talking to Chris Wallace? and Eva Longoria: Searching for Mexico would both be carried by CNN and stream on HBO Max. On August 4, 2022, it was announced that a "hub" featuring CNN original series and documentaries would be added to Discovery+ on August 19, 2022.

In August 2023, CNN subsequently announced that it would launch a new streaming news channel on Max known as CNN Max on September 27, which will feature a mixture of original live news programming and simulcasts of CNN primetime programs.

== Original programming ==
=== Live weekday schedule ===
The network's daily programming included:

- 5 Things with Kate Bolduan; adapted from CNN's podcast and newsletter of the same name, it highlighted the five key stories of the day.
- Go There; an anchorless newscast featuring live field reports by CNN correspondents, and viewer questions.
- Big Picture with Sara Sidner; a discussion program focusing on "the most important and interesting story of the day".
- Reliable Sources Daily; a spin-off of CNN's Sunday morning program, hosted by chief media correspondent Brian Stelter.
- The Source with Kasie Hunt; a political analysis program.
- The Global Brief with Bianca Nobilo (simulcast with CNN International; the only such program simulcast with a linear CNN network).
- Who's Talking to Chris Wallace?; An interview program hosted by former Fox News journalist Chris Wallace, airing Mondays to Thursdays.
- The Newscast with Wolf Blitzer; a newscast billed as a modernized equivalent to a traditional evening newscast, featuring "original reporting from around the world, investigations and consumer focused stories"

=== Weekly schedule ===
- Boss Files with Poppy Harlow (Mondays)
- Anderson Cooper Full Circle (Tuesdays and Saturdays)
- No Mercy, No Malice with Scott Galloway (Tuesdays)
- Parental Guidance with Anderson Cooper (Wednesdays)
- Jake Tapper's Book Club (Sundays)
- Rex Chapman (Mondays)
- The Don Lemon Show (Fridays)

=== Daily schedule ===
- CNN+ Special Report (breaking news coverage)
- Interview Club (CNN+ subscribers ask questions to experts in live interviews)

=== CNN+ Original Series ===
- Land of the Giants: Titans of Tech
- The Murdochs: Empire of Influence
- The Wonder List with Bill Weir (season 4)
- Flashpoints with Fareed Zakaria

=== CNN+ FlashDocs ===
New documentary unit exploring timely and topical pop culture stories.

- Chicago vs. Jussie Smollett
