= Nothing Fancy (cookbook) =

2019 cookbook by Alison Roman

- Author: Alison Roman
- Language: English
- Publisher: Clarkson Potter
- Publication date: 2019
- Media type: Print (Hardback)
- ISBN: 978-0451497017

Nothing Fancy is a 2019 cookbook by American cook and writer Alison Roman. The cookbook stresses casual recipes to prepare for friends.

== Development ==
Roman's first cookbook, Dining In, was published in 2017. Dining In focused on recipes that "had you thinking about eating inside just for yourself" where Nothing Fancy focuses on meals for larger groups and tips for successfully hosting multiple people. The book stresses "unfussy" foods and recipes and the value of authenticity and connection when cooking for and hosting friends or guests in one's home, rather than traditional dinner parties, which tend to focus on presentation and etiquette.

== Structure and contents ==
Roman categorizes recipes into snacks, salads, sides, mains, and "after dinner" and intersperses the book with essays and commentary about food-related subjects, such as sardines and wine. The book's structure mirrors the order in which Roman serves dishes to guests both for casual gatherings and more formal events such as Thanksgiving. The book eschews presenting the reader with suggested menus featuring its recipes, something often found in other cookbooks for hosting.

Roman has said the book contains advice and recipes for an "attainable" life rather than an "aspirational" one.

== Reception and accolades ==
The Guardian included Nothing Fancy on its list of the "Best cookbooks and food writing of 2019". Meera Sodha, who compiled the list, wrote that the book presents "heart, soul and food frequently and unapologetically made using store-cupboard ingredients."

Michele Moses recommended the book to readers of The New Yorker, writing: "Part of the appeal is her grasp of her audience: the financially unsteady millennial generation, which has turned “nothing fancy” into an aesthetic choice." Moses also discussed the accessible persona cultivated by Roman in the book, and highlighted tips accompanying certain recipes that expressed annoyance with some expectations held by guests. Moses refers to Roman as "libidinous and a little bit mean," contrasting her with the "prim and gracious" personas of Ina Garten and Martha Stewart.

Megan Reynolds has "respectfully disagreed" with the sentiment that the book demonstrates an "attainable" rather than "aspirational" lifestyle, saying that "the lifestyle as portrayed in Nothing Fancy is aspirational to a certain subset of Brooklyn women—clog-wearers and devotees of New York Magazine's The Strategist."

In a review of Roman's 2023 dessert cookbook, Sweet Enough, Adam Rothbarth characterized Roman's three cookbooks (Dining In, Nothing Fancy, and Sweet Enough) as "about cooking to be with people", as opposed to purely about "cooking" or "cooking for people".

=== Commercial success ===
The book was a New York Times bestseller.
