= Who's Talking to Chris Wallace? =

American television talk show

- Genre: Talk show
- Presented by: Chris Wallace
- Country of origin: United States
- Original language: English
- No. of seasons: 5
- No. of episodes: 112

Production
- Running time: 22–30 minutes
- Production company: CNN

Original release
- Network: Max
- Release: March 22, 2022 – November 15, 2024

Who's Talking to Chris Wallace? is an American talk show hosted by Chris Wallace that aired on HBO Max from March 22, 2022 to November 15, 2024. The series consists of interviews with one guest per episode. The series also aired edited conversations on CNN.

== Production ==
=== Development ===
Wallace joined CNN in 2020 after 18 years at Fox News, after previously anchoring Fox News Sunday. The show originally ran on CNN+, the network's subscription streaming service, but moved to HBO Max after it was shut down. Wallace also serves as an anchor and analyst on CNN.

== Episodes ==
=== Series overview ===
Season	Episodes	Originally released	
Season	Episodes	First released	Last released
1	30	September 23, 2022	December 31, 2022
2	20	January 8, 2023	March 18, 2023
3	22	April 28, 2023	July 28, 2023
4	10	September 29, 2023	December 1, 2023
5	30	January 19, 2024	November 15, 2024

=== Season 1 (2022) ===
No. overall	No. in season	Title	Guest	Original release date
1	1	"Stephen Breyer (Note: This is the original episode title at the time of release. It was later replaced with the featured guest's name.)"	Stephen Breyer	September 23, 2022
Chris Wallace talks exclusively to recently retired Supreme Court Justice Stephen Breyer about the future of the court in his first television interview since retirement.
2	2	"Tyler Perry"	Tyler Perry	September 23, 2022
Actor, Director and Producer Tyler Perry sits down with Chris Wallace to talk about his early years, his philanthropy and his latest projects.
3	3	"Shania Twain"	Shania Twain	September 23, 2022
Chris Wallace speaks with Singer Shania Twain about her life, her struggles and her career as a global pop sensation.
4	4	"Alex Rodriguez"	Alex Rodriguez	September 30, 2022
Chris Wallace talks with Alex Rodriguez about baseball, business, and what he's learned from his mistakes.
5	5	"José Andrés"	José Andrés	September 30, 2022
Chef José Andrés joins Chris Wallace to discuss his humanitarian work providing food relief to communities around the world.
6	6	"Judd Apatow"	Judd Apatow	September 30, 2022
Chris Wallace and Filmmaker Judd Apatow talk about his latest movie and his career in comedy.
7	7	"Mark Cuban"	Mark Cuban	October 7, 2022
Entrepreneur and Dallas Mavericks owner Mark Cuban joins Chris Wallace for a conversation about his latest business venture, what's wrong with politics and if this could be his last season on Shark Tank.
8	8	"Clive Davis"	Clive Davis	October 7, 2022
Chris Wallace talks to Clive Davis about his remarkable career in the music industry, the moment he discovered Whitney Houston and what he thinks about retirement.
9	9	"Dr. Rochelle Walensky"	Dr. Rochelle Walensky	October 7, 2022
Chris Wallace and the Director of the Centers for Disease Control and Prevention Dr. Rochelle Walensky talk about COVID-19, vaccines, and her future at the CDC.
10	10	"George Clooney"	George Clooney	September 30, 2022
Chris Wallace talks with award-winning Actor and Filmmaker George Clooney
11	11	"Guy Fieri"	Guy Fieri	October 14, 2022
Food Network Host Guy Fieri joins Chris Wallace for a lively conversation about how he became one of the best-known chefs on television.
12	12	"Dick Ebersol"	Dick Ebersol	October 14, 2022
Former Television Executive Dick Ebersol joins Chris Wallace to discuss his career in sports and entertainment and the lessons learned from loss.
13	13	"Meghan Trainor"	Meghan Trainor	October 21, 2022
Songwriter and pop-star, Meghan Trainor talks to Chris about her new album, her song writing process and the message in her music.
14	14	"Eric Adams"	Eric Adams	October 21, 2022
Chris is joined by NYC mayor Eric Adams to talk about crime, the migrant crisis and his political future.
15	15	"James Patterson"	James Patterson	October 21, 2022
Chris talks with author James Patterson about his book empire, being a good storyteller and his passion for kids.
16	16	"Michael Imperioli"	Michael Imperioli	September 30, 2022
Chris talks to actor Michael Imperioli about his roles on The White Lotus and The Sopranos.
17	17	"Pete Buttigieg"	Pete Buttigieg	October 28, 2022
Secretary of Transportation, Pete Buttigieg joined Chris ahead of the 2022 midterm elections to talk about inflation, improving transit needs in the U.S., and the prospect of President Joe Biden running for office again.
18	18	"Byron Allen"	Byron Allen	October 28, 2022
Chris talks to Byron Allen about his early days in comedy and his growing media empire, starting stand up comedy at 14, creating his own media company, empowering Black Americans, and buying an NFL team.
19	19	"Alexandria Ocasio-Cortez"	Alexandria Ocasio-Cortez	November 11, 2022
Alexandria Ocasio-Cortez (AOC) sat down with Chris to talk about the Midterm elections, the impact youth turnout has on the polls, how she deals with hate comments on social media, what it means to feel her own life is in danger, and her opinion on other democrats contesting nominations for President.
20	20	"Henry Winkler"	Henry Winkler	November 11, 2022
Beloved Actor Henry Winkler joins Chris Wallace to talk about his iconic role on the sitcom Happy Days, his current role on the hit show Barry and how he overcame a learning disability.
21	21	"Michelle Zauner"	Michelle Zauner	November 11, 2022
Chris talks to bestselling author and musician Michelle Zauner about her bestselling book Crying in H Mart.
22	22	"Quentin Tarantino"	Quentin Tarantino	November 18, 2022
Chris is joined by American film director Quentin Tarantino to discuss his most recent book, his unique approach to directing, the Harvey Weinstein controversy, his son’s movie choices, and his tenth and final film.
23	23	"Billy Porter"	Billy Porter	November 18, 2022
Billy Porter sits down with Chris Wallace to talk about originating the role of Lola in Kinky Boots, his Emmy Award-winning role in Pose, his memoir Unprotected and his iconic sense of fashion.
24	24	"Kara Swisher"	Kara Swisher	November 18, 2022
Chris talks to American journalist Kara Swisher about some of her most notable interviews including Bill Gates, Steve Jobs, Mark Zuckerberg, and Elon Musk.
25	25	"Gloria Estefan"	Gloria Estefan	December 2, 2022
Singer and songwriter Gloria Estefan joins Chris to talk about her new Christmas album recorded, the remake of the film Father of the Bride, and winning the Presidential Medal of Freedom.
26	26	"Anita Hill"	Anita Hill	December 2, 2022
Chris sits down with Anita Hill to talk about how the past 30 years have been impacted by Clarence Thomas and the overturning of Roe v. Wade.
27	27	"Malcolm Gladwell"	Malcolm Gladwell	December 2, 2022
Journalist, author, and podcast host Malcolm Gladwell joins Chris to discuss his unique perspective on telling stories.
28	28	"Dionne Warwick"	Dionne Warwick	December 9, 2022
Chris is joined by singer-songwriter Dionne Warwick to talk about her life, legacy and her CNN documentary.
29	29	"Tony Hawk"	Tony Hawk	December 31, 2022
Chris Wallace talks to skateboarder Tony Hawk and the sport that made him famous.
30	30	"Dr. Anthony Fauci"	Dr. Anthony Fauci	December 31, 2022
Dr. Anthony Fauci joins Chris Wallace to reflect on his long career, why he plans to retire and what he will do next.

=== Season 2 (2023) ===
No. overall	No. in season	Title	Guest(s)	Original release date
30	1	"James Cameron"	James Cameron	January 8, 2023
Filmmaker James Cameron joins Chris Wallace to discuss his blockbuster Avatar 2 and how he uses art and technology as part of his creative process.
32	2	"Hugh Jackman"	Hugh Jackman	January 8, 2023
Actor, singer and dancer Hugh Jackman joins Chris to talk about his new movie, The Son, his role in the musical The Music Man on Broadway and Wolverine, Jean Valjean, and P. T. Barnum.
33	3	"Andy Cohen"	Andy Cohen	January 13, 2023
Chris is joined by television presenter Andy Cohen where they discuss the appeal of reality television, and his talk show, Watch What Happens Live.
34	4	"Ina Garten"	Ina Garten	January 13, 2023
The Barefoot Contessa Ina Garten joins Chris Wallace to talk about her two decades on the Food Network and how she got her now famous moniker.
35	5	"Nancy Pelosi"	Nancy Pelosi	January 21, 2023
Former House Speaker Nancy Pelosi joins Chris Wallace for a conversation about politics, power and the new HBO Max documentary Pelosi in the House.
36	6	"Idina Menzel"	Idina Menzel	January 21, 2023
Chris Wallace is joined by Singer Idina Menzel to talk about her work as the voice of Elsa in Frozen, her career and a possible return to Broadway.
37	7	"Samantha Power"	Samantha Power	January 28, 2023
USAID Administrator Samantha Power joins Chris Wallace to talk about the current humanitarian crisis in Ukraine and her role leading the U.S. agency.
38	8	"Gary Sinise"	Gary Sinise	January 28, 2023
Chris Wallace talks with Actor Gary Sinise about his career on stage and screen and how serving our nation's heroes helped him find his true mission.
39	9	"Terry Bradshaw"	Terry Bradshaw	February 3, 2023
Sports Broadcaster and football great Terry Bradshaw joins Chris Wallace to talk about his career, his health and his thoughts on Super Bowl 57.
40	10	"Neil DeGrasse Tyson"	Neil DeGrasse Tyson	February 3, 2023
Chris Wallace talks to Astrophysicist Neil deGrasse Tyson who combines science and pop culture to help us better understand observing outer space.
41	11	"Jane Fonda"	Jane Fonda	February 19, 2023
Jane Fonda joins Chris Wallace for a candid conversation about her life, career and what she says is the most important thing she has ever done.
42	12	"Alejandro Mayorkas"	Alejandro Mayorkas	February 19, 2023
Alejandro Mayorkas joins Chris Wallace to discuss the crisis at the border, immigration policy and possible impeachment.
43	13	"Bryan Cranston"	Bryan Cranston	February 26, 2023
Actor Bryan Cranston sits down with Chris Wallace to talk about his iconic roles in television and film.
44	14	"Pink"	Pink	February 26, 2023
Chris Wallace sits down with pop star Pink to talk about her new album, the message in her music and how she balances being a mom and a musician.
45	15	"Mike Krzyzewski"	Mike Krzyzewski	March 5, 2023
Chris Wallace talks with Coach K about his career at Duke, plans for retirement and his thoughts on the future of the game.
46	16	"John Williams"	John Williams	March 5, 2023
Legendary Composer John Williams joins Chris Wallace to talk about his distinguished career spanning seven decades.
47	17	"Governor Gretchen Whitmer "	Governor Gretchen Whitmer	March 14, 2023
Chris Wallace talks with Michigan Governor Gretchen Whitmer about the issues and challenges in her state, her political future and pandemic nickname.
48	18	"Jessica Alba"	Jessica Alba	March 14, 2023
Jessica Alba joins Chris Wallace to talk about her transition from acting to business and her take on how Hollywood has changed.
49	19	"Brian Cox"	Brian Cox	March 18, 2023
Chris Wallace talks with Actor Brian Cox the star of the hit show Succession about his distinguished career in movies and television.
50	20	"Eva Longoria"	Eva Longoria	March 18, 2023
Actress and Activist Eva Longoria joins Chris Wallace to talk about her career, her causes and her new CNN original series Searching for Mexico.

=== Season 3 (2023) ===
No. overall	No. in season	Title	Guest	Original release date
51	1	"Bernie Sanders"	Senator Bernie Sanders	April 28, 2023
Chris Wallace sits down with Senator Bernie Sanders to talk about compromises with Republicans, and the reelection announcement from President Biden.
52	2	"Carol Burnett"	Carol Burnett	April 28, 2023
Comedy legend Carol Burnett joins Chris Wallace. She reflects on her decades in show business and her thoughts on the current state of comedy.
53	3	"Economic Crisis"	Ben Cardin and Bill Cassidy	May 5, 2023
Chris Wallace sits down with Senators Ben Cardin and Bill Cassidy for a conversation about the debt ceiling and how to avoid an economic crisis.
54	4	"Miranda Lambert"	Miranda Lambert	May 5, 2023
Chris Wallace is joined by Country Music Singer Miranda Lambert. They talk about her new album, her new cookbook, and the message in her music.
55	5	"Alexis Ohanian"	Alexis Ohanian	May 12, 2023
Reddit co-founder and tech entrepreneur Alexis Ohanian joins Chris Wallace to talk about AI and his focus on parenting with his wife, Serena Williams.
56	6	"Smokey Robinson"	Smokey Robinson	May 12, 2023
The King of Motown Smokey Robinson joins Chris Wallace to talk about his new music, the songs that made him famous and his thoughts on pop music.
57	7	"James Clyburn"	James Clyburn	May 19, 2023
Chris Wallace is joined by Representative James Clyburn to talk about President Biden's reelection and his leadership role in Congress.
58	8	"Priyanka Chopra Jonas"	Priyanka Chopra Jonas	May 19, 2023
Actress Priyanka Chopra Jonas sits down with Chris Wallace to talk about her path from Bollywood to Hollywood.
59	9	"Dr. Phil"	Dr. Phil	June 2, 2023
Dr. Phil joins Chris Wallace to talk about the impact of social media on mental health and why he ended his successful daytime talk show.
60	10	"Jay Leno"	Jay Leno	June 2, 2023
Comedian Jay Leno joins Chris Wallace for a conversation about comedy, cars and recovery after his recent accidents.
61	11	"Robert Gates"	Robert Gates	June 9, 2023
Former Secretary of Defense Robert Gates joins Chris Wallace to talk about the latest on foreign policy and national security.
62	12	"Padma Lakshmi"	Padma Lakshmi	June 9, 2023
Top Chef’s Padma Lakshmi joins Chris Wallace to talk about her journey from model to author to TV host and what's next on her show Taste the Nation.
63	13	"Arnold Schwarzenegger"	Arnold Schwarzenegger	June 16, 2023
Chris Wallace speaks to Arnold Schwarzenegger about his remarkable story from bodybuilder to movie star to governor.
64	14	"Andy Garcia"	Andy Garcia	June 16, 2023
Actor Andy Garcia joins Chris to talk about his iconic movie roles. From his blockbusters to his independent films and his 35 years in Hollywood.
65	15	"Harrison Ford"	Harrison Ford	June 30, 2023
Chris Wallace is joined by Actor Harrison Ford for a conversation about his iconic roles in film and television.
66	16	"Cory Booker"	Cory Booker	June 30, 2023
Senator Cory Booker sits down with Chris Wallace to talk about the Hunter Biden plea deal, police reform and Presidential politics.
67	17	"Ronna McDaniel"	Ronna McDaniel	July 14, 2023
Chris Wallace speaks with RNC Chairwoman Ronna McDaniel about the 2024 debates, the state of the GOP and former President Trump's place in the party.
68	18	"Goldie Hawn"	Goldie Hawn	July 14, 2023
Actress Goldie Hawn joins Chris Wallace to talk about her fearless career choices, her thoughts on marriage and her passion for helping children.
69	19	"Matt Damon"	Matt Damon	July 21, 2023
Actor Matt Damon joins Chris Wallace to talk about his new film Oppenheimer, his thoughts on fame and his friendship with Ben Affleck.
79	20	"Laura Linney"	Laura Linney	July 21, 2023
Chris talks to Actress Laura Linney about her memorable career in theater, movies and television and why she doesn't want to be in a blockbuster.
71	21	"Brad Paisley"	Brad Paisley	July 28, 2023
Chris Wallace sits down with country music star Brad Paisley for a conversation about his new music.
72	22	"Sharon Stone"	Sharon Stone	July 28, 2023
Actress Sharon Stone joins Chris Wallace to talk about her colorful career playing provocative roles, her reputation in Hollywood and her new focus.

=== Season 4 (2023) ===
No. overall	No. in season	Title	Guest	Original release date
73	1	"Oliver Stone"	Oliver Stone	September 29, 2023
Chris Wallace is joined by director Oliver Stone who expresses doubts about JFK’s assassination, defends Vladimir Putin, and reminisces on his films.
74	2	"Al Michaels"	Al Michaels	October 6, 2023
Famed sports broadcaster Al Michaels joins Chris to talk about his career filled with memorable moments as the voice for generations of sports fans.
75	3	"Jon Batiste"	Jon Batiste	October 13, 2023
Chris Wallace is joined by musician Jon Batiste for a piano-side conversation at the famed Juilliard School.
76	4	"Ken Jennings"	Ken Jennings	October 20, 2023
Chris Wallace sits down with Jeopardy! Host Ken Jennings to talk about the show’s popularity, strategies for winning, and Alex Trebek’s legacy.
77	5	"Charles Barkley"	Charles Barkley	October 27, 2023
Former NBA player Charles Barkley talks about his life and career and his TV series, King Charles, on CNN.
78	6	"Suze Orman"	Suze Orman	November 4, 2023
Suze Orman joins Chris Wallace to share her practical advice for investing and her mission to educate consumers.
79	7	"Barry Manilow"	Barry Manilow	November 10, 2023
Barry Manilow talks about his career writing and performing songs.
80	8	"Charlamagne tha God"	Charlamagne tha God	November 17, 2023
Charlamagne tha God to reflects on the success of his show; his take on the 2024 presidential election.
81	9	"Bethenny Frankel"	Bethenny Frankel	November 24, 2023
Businesswoman and former reality television star Bethenny Frankel joins Chris Wallace to talk about unions, how she built a multi-million-dollar brand and why her focus shifted to helping people in need.
82	10	"Adam Driver"	Adam Driver	December 1, 2023
Adam Driver talks about his new film, Michael Mann's Ferrari, the roles that made him famous from Girls, Star Wars and Marriage Story.

=== Season 5 (2024) ===
No. overall	No. in season	Title	Guest	Original release date
83	1	"Jon Hamm"	Jon Hamm	January 19, 2024
Jon Hamm joins to talk about one of his best-known roles on Mad Men, how he avoided being typecast and what he learned working alongside Tom Cruise.
84	2	"Drew Carey"	Drew Carey	January 26, 2024
Comedian and The Price Is Right host Drew Carey joins Chris Wallace to share game show strategy and advice from famed host Bob Barker.
85	3	"Melissa Etheridge"	Melissa Etheridge	February 2, 2024
Melissa Etheridge talks about her iconic sound and memorable songs, her coming-out story and how she turned pain into purpose.
86	4	"George Lopez"	George Lopez	February 9, 2024
George Lopez joins Wallace to talk about the real drama that inspired his sitcom, his trailblazing career and how he uses honesty to make us laugh.
87	5	"Rob Reiner"	Rob Reiner	February 16, 2024
Rob Reiner sits down with Wallace to talk about his iconic career in front of and behind the camera, and his documentary on Christian Nationalism.
88	6	"Wendell Pierce"	Wendell Pierce	March 1, 2024
Actor Wendell Pierce joins talks about the role that defined his career, his similarity to a Supreme Court Justice and how Broadway gave him purpose.
89	7	"Sam Waterston"	Sam Waterston	March 8, 2024
Sam Waterston sits down to talk about his time on the television classic Law & Order, his connection to President Lincoln and why he won’t retire.
90	8	"Beau Bridges"	Beau Bridges	March 15, 2024
Beau Bridges joins to talk about his return to screen, what it's like having a famous family and the truth behind his relationship with his brother.
91	9	"Misty Copeland"	Misty Copeland	March 22, 2024
Dancer Misty Copeland joins to talk about her history making career, how she broke ballet’s glass ceiling and her mission to inspire with every step.
92	10	"Larry David"	Larry David	March 29, 2024
Comedian Larry David sits down with Wallace to talk about the final season of Curb Your Enthusiasm and the story behind an iconic Seinfeld episode.
93	11	"Gloria Steinem"	Gloria Steinem	April 12, 2024
The icon Gloria Steinem sits down to talk about her career, the status of the women’s liberation movement and why she feels hopeful for the future.
94	12	"Maura Tierney"	Maura Tierney	April 19, 2024
Actress Maura Tierney joins Chris Wallace for a conversation about her latest series.
95	13	"Ethan Hawke"	Ethan Hawke	April 26, 2024
Actor and Director Ethan Hawke joins Chris Wallace to talk about the experience of directing his daughter in his new film Wildcats.
96	14	"Michael Douglas"	Michael Douglas	May 3, 2024
Michael Douglas joins to talk about his legacy, his relationship with his famous father and his concerns about the state of our democracy.
97	15	"Whoopi Goldberg"	Whoopi Goldberg	May 10, 2024
Whoopi Goldberg, the maven of daytime talk, discusses her new memoir, her groundbreaking career and previously untold stories from the comedy legend.
98	16	"Jean Smart"	Jean Smart	May 17, 2024
Jean Smart joins to talk about her show Hacks, her status as a gay icon, and what it's like being at the top after a career spanning five decades.
99	17	"Bill Maher"	Bill Maher	May 31, 2024
Chris Wallace is joined by comedian and host Bill Maher. They talk about his start in standup and how the country and politics have changed.
100	18	"Scott Galloway"	Scott Galloway	June 7, 2024
Professor Scott Galloway joins to talk about his career shaking up conventional wisdom, his new book and why mentoring young men is deeply personal.
101	19	"Darius Rucker"	Darius Rucker	June 14, 2024
Musician Darius Rucker joins to talk about his new book telling his life story through songs, and the legendary singer that led him to a mega hit.
102	20	"Judge Judy Sheindlin"	Judge Judy Sheindlin	June 21, 2024
Judge Judy Sheindlin joins Chris Wallace to talk about her career and how she explains her loyal following.
103	21	"Colman Domingo"	Colman Domingo	June 28, 2024
Wallace is joined by actor Colman Domingo to talk about his new film Sing Sing and how it changed his feelings about the criminal justice system.
104	22	"Dennis Quaid"	Dennis Quaid	September 6, 2024
Dennis Quaid talks about his new film Reagan, reflections on his career highs and lows and the role of faith and music in his life.
105	23	"Robert De Niro"	Robert De Niro	September 13, 2024
Actor Robert De Niro joins Chris Wallace to share his take on the November election and why he feels compelled to speak out.
106	24	"Stephen A. Smith"	Stephen A. Smith	September 20, 2024
Sports commentator Stephen A. Smith joins Chris Wallace to talk about his unapologetic approach and hot takes.
107	25	"Jim Parsons"	Jim Parsons	October 11, 2024
Jim Parsons talks about his Broadway play, his journey from television commercials to prime-time star and his take on a return of The Big Bang Theory.
108	26	"Kevin O'Leary"	Kevin O'Leary	October 18, 2024
Business mogul Kevin O’Leary talks about Shark Tank, tips for anyone looking to invest and which presidential candidate is better for the economy.
109	27	"Justin Hartley"	Justin Hartley	October 25, 2024
Justin Hartley discusses his hit show Tracker, why it appeals to so many viewers and the lessons he learned from working on soap operas.
110	28	"Wes Moore"	Wes Moore	November 1, 2024
Governor Wes Moore talks about the presidential race and his role as a surrogate for the Harris campaign, being Maryland's first Black governor.
111	29	"Anna Kendrick"	Anna Kendrick	November 8, 2024
Anna Kendrick talks about her role as first-time director in "Woman of the Hour", the legendary actor who put her at ease and her big singing voice.
112	30	"Ralph Macchio"	Ralph Macchio	November 15, 2024
Wallace talks with actor Ralph Macchio about his iconic role as "The Karate Kid", the spin-off "Cobra Kai" and the childhood dream that came true.
