= Alison Roman =

American chef and food writer (born 1985)

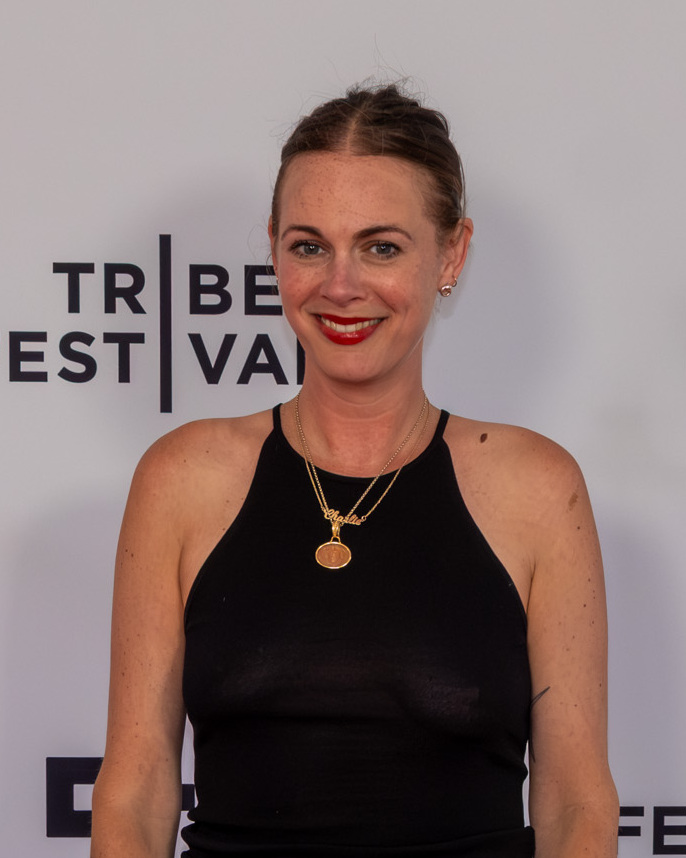
- Roman in 2026
- Born: September 1, 1985 (age 41); Los Angeles, California, U.S.
- Education: University of California, Santa Cruz
- Years active: 2011–present
- Spouse: Max Cantor (m. 2023)
- Children: 1
- Website: www.alisoneroman.com

Alison E. Roman (born September 1, 1985) is an American food writer, chef, and internet personality. She is best known for her viral recipes, such as #TheStew and #TheCookies, which were widely shared on social media platforms. Roman has held senior positions at Bon Appétit and Buzzfeed Food, and served as a columnist for New York Times Cooking. Roman is the author of several cookbooks, including the New York Times Bestseller Nothing Fancy (2019).

== Early life and education ==
Roman was born September 1, 1985, and raised in Los Angeles, California, in the San Fernando Valley area. She withdrew from the University of California, Santa Cruz, at the age of 19, where she was studying creative writing, to pursue a career in the food industry, eventually working as a chef at Sona in Los Angeles, Quince in San Francisco, Milk Bar in New York City and Pies ‘n’ Thighs in Brooklyn.

== Career ==
=== Bon Appétit and early career (2011–2018) ===
Roman began as a freelance recipe-tester at Bon Appétit in 2011 soon after the magazine had come under the leadership of editor-in-chief Adam Rapoport. She quickly gained a full-time position at the magazine and eventually became a senior food editor. Roman appeared prominently in the magazine's videos, articles and social media content. Roman left Bon Appétit in 2015 for a senior role at Buzzfeed Food. Her first cookbook, Dining In, was published by Penguin Random House in 2017.

=== The New York Times, viral recipes and controversy (2018–2020) ===
In early 2018, a cookie recipe Roman developed for Dining In (2017) went viral on Instagram, and became so well-known on the mobile app as to be known simply as #TheCookies. Months later she joined New York Times Cooking as a regular columnist. Her second cookbook, Nothing Fancy (2019), enjoyed commercial and critical success when it was published the following year. The cookbook stresses the value of "unfussy" ingredients and the importance of authenticity when hosting friends and guests. Several of the recipes she developed for the book and The New York Times went viral, including the #TheStew.

Roman's recipes and online presence took off during the COVID-19 pandemic as more people turned to home cooking. Her shallot pasta recipe (commonly known as #ThePasta), was particularly popular amidst the food shortages and constraints of the pandemic due to its use of everyday, pantry ingredients. New York Times Cooking later deemed it the most popular recipe of 2020. In May 2020, Roman was criticized on social media for an interview in which she made critical remarks about the product lines of Chrissy Teigen and Marie Kondo, both of whom are of Asian descent. Critics claimed these remarks had racial undertones and pointed to her past practice of using Asian flavors in her recipes without acknowledging the sources of these flavors. After Teigen responded on Twitter and then locked her own account, Roman apologized. During this time, Roman's New York Times column was put on temporary leave, with the intention to be reintroduced at some point in the future.

=== Departure and continued career (2020–present) ===
In December 2020, Roman announced she would be leaving The New York Times to begin a "new chapter" elsewhere. Starting in 2021, she produced a series Home Movies with Alison Roman, a cooking show, on her YouTube channel. She was set to produce a new cooking program for CNN+ in 2022. After shutdown of CNN+, the show was moved to CNN as (More Than) A Cooking Show but then pulled. She filmed two seasons and is seeking a new outlet for distributing the series. In 2023, she opened a small market called First Bloom in the Catskills in Bloomville, New York. In 2025 she launched her own tomato sauce, A Very Good Tomato Sauce.

== Personal life ==
Roman has lived in Brooklyn, New York, since at least 2018. She describes herself as "half-Jewish" and regularly celebrates Passover and other religious holidays since moving to New York. She married producer Max Cantor on September 9, 2023. On their first anniversary, Roman announced via her Instagram page that the couple was expecting their first child . On January 23, 2025, Roman posted a photo of newborn son Charlie Davis Roman Cantor, noting that he had been born "almost a month early".

== Bibliography ==
- Lemons. Short Stack Books, 2015. ISBN 9780990785323
- Dining In. Clarkson Potter/Publishers, 2017. ISBN 9780451496997
- With Fabián von Hauske and Jeremiah Stone, A Very Serious Cookbook: Contra Wildair. Phaidon Press, 2018. ISBN 9780714876023
- Nothing Fancy. Clarkson Potter Publishers, 2019. ISBN 9780451497017
- Sweet Enough: A Dessert Cookbook. Clarkson Potter Publishers, 2023. ISBN 9781984826398
- Something from Nothing. Clarkson Potter Publishers, 2025. ISBN 9781984826411
