= Andrew Morse =

Television executive

- Born: March 10, 1974 (age 52); Potomac, Maryland, U.S
- Education: Cornell University (BA)
- Occupation: Television news executive
- Known for: Executive Vice President and Chief Digital Officer of CNN Worldwide; Cofounder of Great Big Story; Head of CNN+; Head of Bloomberg Television (U.S.); Bureau chief at ABC News
- Title: President and publisher of The Atlanta Journal-Constitution
- Spouse: Ana-Karina Morse (m. 2004)
- Children: Cecilia-Ava Morse, Holden Morse
- Parent(s): Erica Ritter Morse; Lewis F. Morse

Andrew Morse (born March 10, 1974) is an American journalist and news executive. He was president and publisher of The Atlanta Journal-Constitution.

He was the Executive Vice President of CNN US, as well as EVP and chief digital officer of CNN Worldwide from 2013 until 2022. Morse is also the co-founder of Great Big Story, a digital storytelling network. He previously held executive, editorial and production roles at ABC News and Bloomberg L.P.

== Early life and education ==
Morse was born in Potomac, Maryland, the son of Erica (née Ritter) and Lewis F. Morse.

He attended the Landon School, an independent boys day school in Bethesda, Maryland, for his grade school education. He graduated from Cornell University, where he majored in government and was the editor-in-chief of The Cornell Daily Sun. In 2009, he was a Fellow of the Punch Sulzberger Executive News Media Leadership Program at the Columbia University Graduate School of Journalism.

== Career ==
=== ABC News (1996–2011) ===
Morse joined ABC News as a desk assistant and production coordinator for its Washington Bureau in 1997. He was an associate producer for ABC News.com when it launched that year, beginning his lifelong career in digital news. From 1998 to 2001, he was an assignment editor and producer at ABC's London bureau. In 2001, he tracked the voyage of Team Adventure as they attempted to break the record for the fastest Transatlantic crossing.

He was the Asia bureau chief and producer from 2002 until 2005. He led ABC's coverage of events like the War in Afghanistan, Iraq War, 2011 Egyptian revolution, 2010 Haiti earthquake, 2004 South Asia Tsunami and the 2002 Bali bombings. In 2003, Morse filmed his ascent to the Mount Everest Base Camp as part of a special celebrating the 50th anniversary of the first successful ascent of Mount Everest. He spent two weeks reporting from North Korea in 2004. During this visit, he was detained, and had his notes and video footage confiscated by the Korean Friendship Association.

After returning to the United States in 2005, Morse was a senior producer for the network's early morning programmes, including the weekend edition of World News Now, and Good Morning America. From 2007 to 2010, Morse was the Executive Producer of Good Morning America Weekend. He also served as Executive Producer of Innovation, overseeing ABC's digital portfolio, including the 24-hour broadband channel ABC News Now, as well as the development and launch of its iPad and iPhone applications. Morse is credited with developing The Quick Fix, a short-form online news programme which launched in 2009. The programme was more conversational and irreverent tone, which drew in younger audiences. He also oversaw ABC's first media partnership with Facebook in 2008.

=== Bloomberg (2011–2013) ===
Morse was head of the Bloomberg television network in the U.S. from 2011 to 2013. While at Bloomberg, he launched a new programming slate, built up the network's technology coverage and the San Francisco Bureau. He led Bloomberg's work in digital programming and expanded its viewership beyond its core audience. He also produced the network's first Presidential Debate and coverage of the 2012 Republican and Democratic National Conventions.

=== CNN (2013–2022) ===
In 2013, Morse became senior vice president of editorial at CNN US Television. Morse managed U.S. newsgathering and the D.C. bureau operations, including all political coverage. Jeff Zucker stated that Morse's hire was meant to connect the network's digital and television newsgathering efforts.

In 2014, he was promoted to Executive Vice President and General Manager of CNN Digital Worldwide, in addition to his editorial role. He managed its editorial, product, technology, business development and partnerships. He managed various platforms including CNN.com, CNN Underscored, CNN Audio, and Vault by CNN.

CNN Digital expanded significantly during his tenure, and partnered with distributors like Apple TV, Roku, Pluto TV, Samsung and Snapchat Discover. He oversaw the acquisition of Canopy, a technology company specializing in data privacy and content recommendation. In 2020, Fast Company included CNN Digital on its list of the "Best Workplaces for Innovators".

Morse spearheaded CNN+, the network’s streaming service, oversaw the content and product development, as well as the hiring of 500 employees and on air talent. He also secured funding from WarnerMedia and AT&T. CNN+ launched on March 29, 2022.

==== Great Big Story ====
Morse co-founded Great Big Story with Chris Berend, as a separate operation from CNN. The start-up launched in October 2015 as a social and mobile-first video streaming network not focused on news content.

=== The Atlanta Journal-Constitution (2023–2026) ===
Morse became president and publisher of The Atlanta Journal-Constitution in January 2023. During his tenure, Morse began a process of expanding the publication's digital subscriber base, local coverage, op-eds, and digital content, including newsletters and other media. The AJC also expanded into filmmaking, creating its first feature-length documentary, The South Got Something To Say. Morse has also overseen the launch of new products related to politics, such as Politically Georgia, and products related to Black culture like UATL. In 2024, the publication launched a mobile application and an updated website. He stepped down as president and publisher in June 2026.

== Awards and honors ==
Morse has received numerous awards and nominations over the course of his career. He has been nominated for several Emmy Awards, winning two. Morse was named one of the "Changemakers in Media" by Digiday in 2017. He was also included on Variety's "New Power of New York List 2017." In 2018, Morse was awarded the Media Visionary Award for his commitment to the community.

Year	Award	Association
2018	Media Visionary Award	
2010	News & Documentary Emmy Award for Outstanding Live Coverage of a Current News Story – Long Form	2010 Emmy Awards
2004	News & Documentary Emmy Award for Outstanding Investigative Journalism in a Regularly Scheduled Newscast	2004 Emmy Awards

== Personal life ==
He is married to Ana Karina Burdsall; they have two children. His wife is a writer, and was the president of the board of directors of ECPAT USA. He is a marathon runner and triathlete, having completed an Ironman in 2019.

== Filmography ==
Year	Title	Credited as	Notes
2011	Target: Bin Laden	Executive producer	TV documentary
2009–2011	ABC World News Tonight with David Muir	Executive producer	2 episodes
2005–2010	Good Morning America Weekend	Executive producer, senior producer	
2005–2006	Good Morning America	Senior producer	
2004	Primetime	Segment producer	1 episode
