= 2020 United States presidential debates =

Part of the 2020 U.S. presidential election

- September 29, 2020; October 22, 2020

Nominee	Donald Trump	Joe Biden
Party	Republican	Democratic
Home state	Florida (Note: Trump's official state of residence was New York in the 2016 election but changed to Florida when his permanent residence was switched from Trump Tower to Mar-a-Lago in 2019.)	Delaware
- 2020 United States vice presidential debate
- October 7, 2020
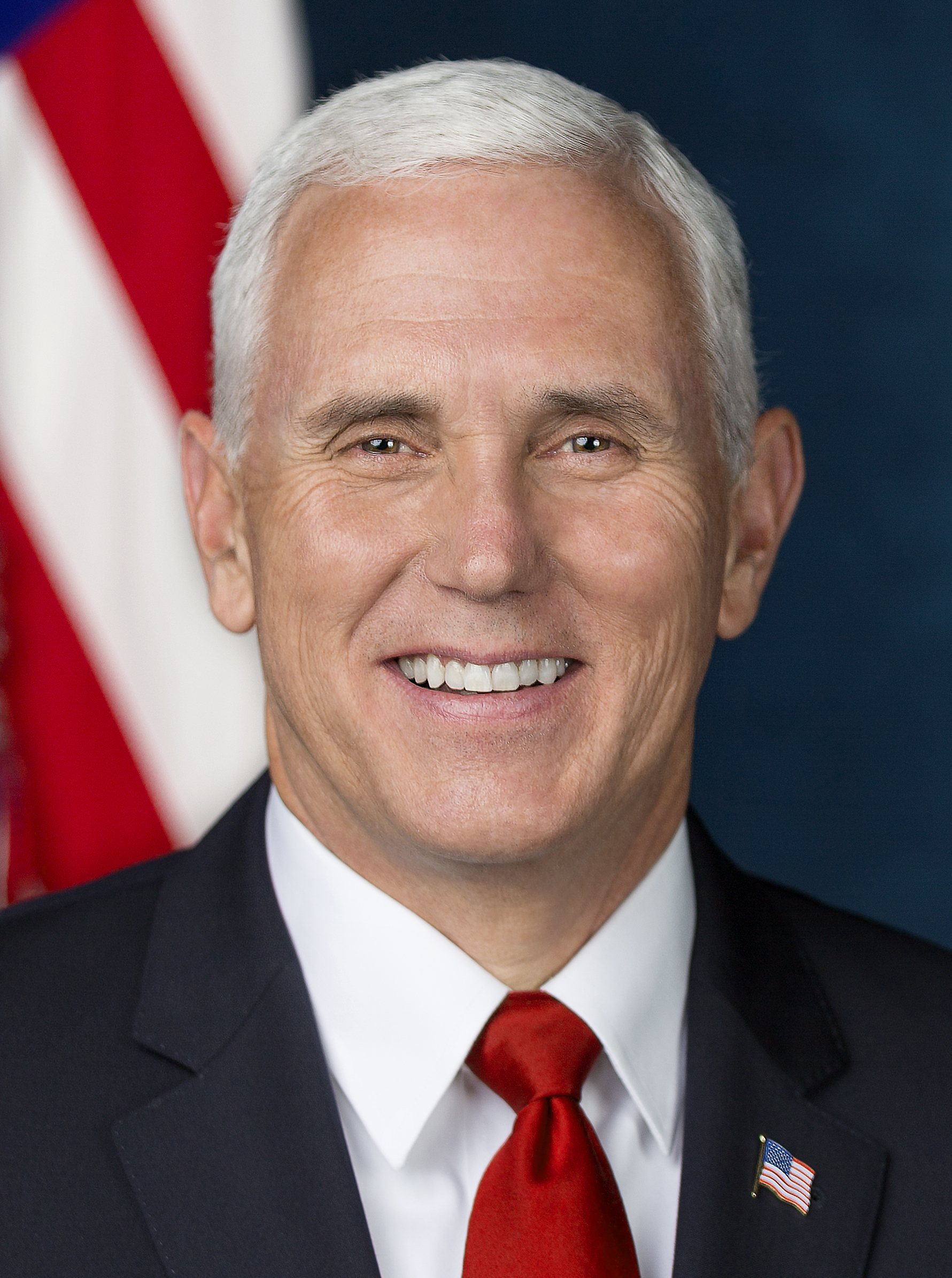

Nominee	Mike Pence	Kamala Harris
Party	Republican	Democratic
Home state	Indiana	California

The 2020 United States presidential debates were a series of debates held during the 2020 presidential election.

The Commission on Presidential Debates (CPD), a bipartisan organization formed in 1987, organized three debates among the major party candidates, and sponsored two presidential debates and one vice presidential debate. Only Republican nominee Donald Trump and Democratic nominee Joe Biden met the criteria for inclusion in the debates, and thus were the only two to appear in the debates. The vice presidential debate took place between their respective vice presidential running mates, Mike Pence and Kamala Harris.

There were three initially planned scheduled presidential debates. The first presidential debate took place on September 29, 2020. The next presidential debate was scheduled to take place on October 15 but was later canceled due to Trump's COVID-19 diagnosis and refusal to appear remotely rather than in person. As a result, 2020 had the fewest debates since 1996. The final presidential debate took place on October 22, 2020. Additionally, a vice presidential debate took place on October 7, 2020.

== Background ==
On October 11, 2019, the Commission on Presidential Debates (CPD) announced that it would host three presidential debates and one vice presidential debate.

In 2019, Trump claimed that the 2016 debates were "biased", and suggested that he may not participate in further CPD-hosted debates. In December 2019, Frank J. Fahrenkopf Jr., the co-chairman of the CPD, met with Brad Parscale, Trump's campaign chairman, to discuss Trump's comments. Fahrenkopf said "the president wanted to debate, but they had concerns about whether or not to do it with the commission." While Trump did not press the issue further publicly, in June 2020, he requested additional debates to the traditional three, which Biden's campaign declined. At the end of June, representatives of the Biden campaign confirmed that they had agreed to the original schedule.

The Trump campaign submitted a request to the CPD to move the scheduled debates up in the calendar, or to add a fourth debate in relation to mail-in voting; the request was declined in August 2020. Later that month, Speaker of the House Nancy Pelosi suggested that Biden should skip the debates, claiming that Trump will "probably act in a way that is beneath the dignity of the presidency". Biden responded by stating that he would go ahead and participate to "be a fact-checker on the floor while [...] debating [Trump]".

== Qualification of candidates ==
In order to qualify for the debates sponsored by the CPD, presidential candidates had to meet the following criteria; vice-presidential candidates qualify by being the running mate of a qualifying presidential candidate:

- Be constitutionally eligible to hold the presidency.
- Appear on a sufficient number of ballots to have a mathematical possibility of winning a majority vote in the Electoral College.
  - In theory, this means a candidate could win the election despite not meeting this criterion and hence not qualifying for the debates, as a candidate can win the election despite having a minority vote in the Electoral College. In practice, this has only happened once.
- Have a level of support of at least 15% of the national electorate as determined by five national public opinion polling organizations selected by the commission, using the average of those organizations' most recently reported results at the time of determination. The five polls were chosen with the advice of Frank Newport of Gallup, based on how Newport and the commission perceived these criteria:
  - The reliable frequency of polling and sample size used by the polling organization.
  - The soundness of the survey methodology employed by the polling organization.
  - The longevity and reputation of the polling organization.
  - The five polls were:
    - ABC/The Washington Post Poll
    - CNN Poll
    - Fox News Poll
    - NBC/The Wall Street Journal Poll
    - NPR/PBS NewsHour/Marist Poll

== Debate list ==
Three presidential debates and one vice presidential debate were initially scheduled:

2020 United States presidential election debates
No.	Date and time	Host	Location	Moderator	Participants	
Key: P Participant					Republican	Democratic
Key: P Participant					President Donald Trump of Florida	Vice President Joe Biden of Delaware
1	Tuesday, September 29, 2020; 9:00 p.m.–10:30 p.m. EDT	Case Western Reserve University	Cleveland, Ohio	Chris Wallace of Fox	P	P
~~2~~	~~Thursday, October 15, 2020~~; ~~9:00 p.m.–10:30 p.m. EDT~~	~~Arsht Center~~	~~Miami, Florida~~	~~Steve Scully of C-SPAN~~	Canceled	
3	Thursday, October 22, 2020; 9:00 p.m.–10:30 p.m. EDT	Belmont University	Nashville, Tennessee	Kristen Welker of NBC	P	P

2020 United States vice presidential debate
No.	Date and time	Host	Location	Moderator	Participants	
Key: P Participant					Republican	Democratic
Key: P Participant					Vice President Mike Pence of Indiana	Senator Kamala Harris of California
VP	Wednesday, October 7, 2020; 9:00 p.m.–10:30 p.m. EDT	University of Utah	Salt Lake City, Utah	Susan Page of USA Today	P	P

== September 29: First presidential debate (Case Western Reserve University) ==
First presidential debate
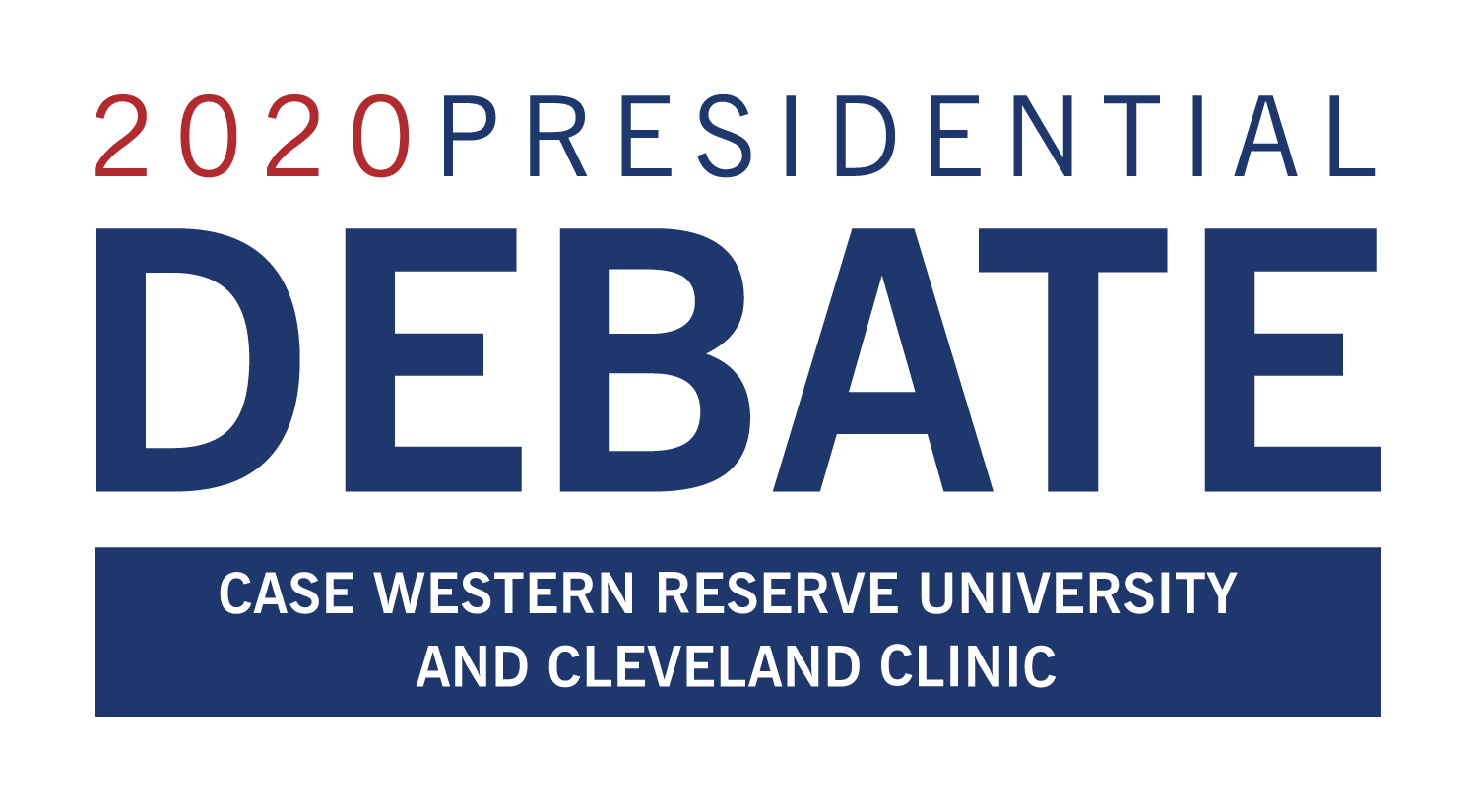
- Date(s): September 29, 2020
- Duration: 95 minutes
- Venue: Health Education Campus (HEC) Samson Pavilion at Case Western Reserve University
- Location: Cleveland, Ohio
- Participants: Donald Trump; Joe Biden
- Footage: Fox News (lower bitrate), PBS (higher bitrate)
- Moderator(s): Chris Wallace of Fox
- Transcript
- Fact checking: FactCheck.org; CNN; CBS News; The New York Times
- Website: my.clevelandclinic.org/debate

The first presidential debate between President Donald Trump and former Vice President Joe Biden took place on Tuesday, September 29, 2020, at the Samson Pavilion of the Health Education Campus (HEC), which is shared by Case Western Reserve University and Cleveland Clinic in Cleveland, Ohio. The debate was moderated by Chris Wallace of Fox.

According to a 2021 book by Trump's White House chief of staff Mark Meadows, Trump had tested positive for COVID-19 on September 26, three days before the debate, and six days before he was hospitalised for COVID-19. Meadows also said Trump tested negative from a different test shortly after the positive result. Trump denied this story and called it false.

The debate was originally scheduled to take place in the Phillip J. Purcell Pavilion located within the Edmund P. Joyce Center at the University of Notre Dame in Indiana, but Notre Dame withdrew as a host site on July 27, 2020, due to concerns about the COVID-19 pandemic.

=== Prelude ===
Entering into the debate, Biden had a significant and persistent lead in the polls. Biden's lead was compounded by a funding shortage in Trump's campaign, with Biden's campaign donations improving significantly.

Since Biden's successful nomination in the Democratic primaries, Trump had attempted to cast doubt over Biden's abilities, claiming that he was suffering from dementia and that he was taking performance-enhancing drugs in the primaries. Trump called for Biden to be drug tested before the debate. Biden mocked the idea. Trump also claimed that Biden would use a hidden electronic earpiece for the debate, demanding that Biden's ears be searched. Biden declined.

Running up to the debate, Trump made repeated claims that the election would be rigged by means of voter fraud, especially with regards to mail-in ballots. When asked if he would commit to a peaceful transition of power, Trump said, "we'll have to wait and see;" however, in a later press briefing, he said that he did believe in a peaceful transition of power. In several instances, Trump called for his supporters to vote twice—in order to test safeguards against voter fraud—even though voting more than once is a felony.

In the weeks leading up to the debate, Trump became part of various controversies. Bob Woodward released his second book on the Trump presidency, based on 19 recorded interviews with Trump. In one recording made in February 2020, Trump indicated that he understood the severity of the COVID-19 pandemic early on, which contrasted with Trump's attempts to publicly play down the virus. Trump confirmed that he downplayed the severity of the pandemic, saying that "I don't want to create a panic." The New York Times published an investigation into Trump's federal tax returns, which found that Trump had paid no tax at all in 10 out of 15 years studied, and only $750 in federal income tax for 2016 and 2017. Additionally, they reported that his businesses lost money in most years. A few days before the debate, the US reached the milestone of 200,000 deaths from COVID-19. This number represented 20% of worldwide fatalities, despite the US having only 4% of the world's population.

Nearly two weeks prior to the debate, Supreme Court Justice Ruth Bader Ginsburg died from cancer. Ginsburg was one of four Supreme Court justices who are commonly considered liberal; the other five justices are commonly considered to be conservative. The day after Ginsburg's funeral, Trump nominated conservative Amy Coney Barrett. Senate Republicans, under the leadership of Senate Majority Leader Mitch McConnell, moved swiftly, promising to vote on her nomination before Election Day. The move was controversial, since the same Senate Republicans had refused to consider a Supreme Court nomination of Merrick Garland by then-President Barack Obama in an election year.

=== Format and debate ===
The debate was divided into six segments: "Trump's and Biden's records, the Supreme Court, the COVID-19 pandemic, race and violence in cities, election integrity, and the economy". Each was approximately 15 minutes in length; Wallace introduced each topic and gave each candidate two minutes to speak, followed by facilitated discussion between them. The allotted time was generally not upheld; Trump repeatedly interrupted and criticized Biden during Biden's answers to the initial questions as well as during the facilitated discussions, and was chastised by Wallace several times for doing so. On several occasions, Wallace pleaded with Trump to respect the rules and norms of the debate. At one point, Biden refused to answer a question given by Wallace, leading to Trump interrupting him. Biden then remarked to Trump, "Will you shut up, man?" Biden also said in response to allegations that he would implement "socialist medicine", "The party is me. I am the Democratic Party right now. The Democratic platform is what I, in fact, approved of." Additionally, Biden called Trump a "clown" during the discussion about healthcare plans.

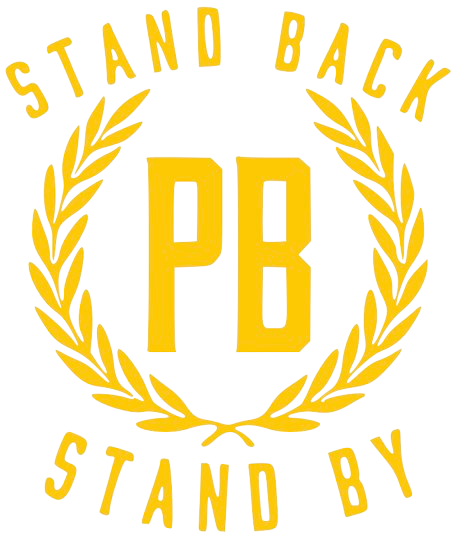
After the debate, an alternate logo was made by the Proud Boys to allude to Trump's comments.

At one point during the debate, Biden and Wallace pressed Trump to condemn white supremacy groups. When Trump replied "Give me a name...", Biden responded with "The Proud Boys". Trump then said "Proud Boys, stand back and stand by", a remark interpreted by some members of that far-right group, as well as others, as a call to arms. When asked about his position on police reform, Biden called for an increase in police funding, in opposition to left-wing rhetoric calling for a defunding of police. He explained such funds would be used to hire psychologists or psychiatrists who would accompany police officers during 9-1-1 calls in order to defuse potentially violent situations and reduce the use of force, and improve officer training.

Fact checkers challenged many of Trump's statements. Trump falsely said that he "brought back (college) football"; as he had commented on his wish for the conferences to play, but took no official action. Trump also repeated the claim that he "got back" Seattle and Minneapolis from left-wing protesters, and continued to repeat conspiracy theories about voter fraud. He said, without evidence, that drug prices will fall "80 or 90 percent," in reference to his efforts to cut drug prices and exaggerated that he is making insulin at prices "so cheap, it's like water", despite insulin prices remaining fixed at about $300 per vial. Trump also misleadingly said that the U.S. economy before the pandemic was "the greatest economy in the history of our country"; although GDP growth was high in the first three years of the Trump presidency, it was higher under Presidents Dwight D. Eisenhower, Lyndon B. Johnson, and Bill Clinton, and the unemployment rate was lower under Eisenhower. Nominal GDP was higher than at any point in US history, but this is true for the large majority of US Presidencies.

When Biden brought up Trump's March 2020 remarks about injecting disinfectant to treat COVID-19, Trump claimed that they had been made sarcastically. Trump then stated that he brought back 700,000 manufacturing jobs; a false figure given that the actual number was 487,000. Biden then made several false claims, claiming that under Trump, the trade deficit with China grew and violent crime went up (only the national murder rate increased). Trump criticized Biden's handling of the 2009 swine flu pandemic, a pandemic in which an estimated 60 million cases in the United States occurred, with an estimated death toll of about 12,000. When Biden mentioned that Trump should get "a lot smarter", Trump said, "Don't ever use the word smart with me, don't ever use that word [...] Because there's nothing smart about you, Joe," and incorrectly stated that Biden forgot where he went to college, referring to a video in which Biden talks about announcing his first Senate campaign on the campus of Delaware State University.

=== Reception and aftermath ===
Debate winner
Outlet	Biden	Trump	Not sure
CNN/SSRS	60%	28%	12%
CBS News	48%	41%	11%

A post-debate CNN/SSRS poll found that 60% of debate-viewers thought that Biden had won and 28% thought Trump had, with a margin of error of six points. According to a CBS News poll taken following the debate, 48% of people thought Biden won, 41% of people thought Trump won, while 10% considered it a tie, with a margin of error of three points. In the same poll, 83% of the respondents believed the tone of the debate was negative, while 17% believed it was positive. The debate was largely seen negatively across the political spectrum.

The debate was widely criticized by commentators and journalists. It was called "a hot mess, inside a dumpster fire, inside a train wreck" and a "disgrace" (CNN's Jake Tapper); a "shitshow" (CNN's Dana Bash); "mud-wrestling" (ABC's Martha Raddatz); "the worst presidential debate I have ever seen in my life" (ABC's George Stephanopoulos); and "the single worst debate I have ever covered in my two decades of doing this job" (CNN's Chris Cillizza). The New York Times editorial board called the debate "excruciating" and wrote: "After five years of conditioning, the president's ceaseless lies, insults and abuse were no less breath-taking to behold." The Washington Post editorial board called the debate "a disgrace" and demonstrated that "Trump's assault on democracy is escalating." ABC White House correspondent Jonathan Karl said that Trump "came across as a bully" in the debate. According to the Washington Examiner, some conservatives criticized Wallace for an alleged bias against Trump due to Wallace's frequent interruptions of Trump. After moderating the debate, Wallace described his performance as moderator as "a terrible missed opportunity" and remarked that he had not been prepared for Trump's behavior. In response to the failure of the debate and subsequent criticism, the Commission on Presidential Debates indicated that it would modify future debates to encourage a more civilized and orderly discussion. While Biden said that he was open to changes, Trump rejected the idea, suggesting that changes would erode his advantage. Despite criticism of his moderation, the CPD defended Wallace's moderation ability, commending his "professionalism and skill".

Trump's "stand by" remarks received criticism. Rick Santorum, a former Republican senator, later said that it was a "huge mistake" by Trump not to condemn white supremacy properly during the debate. Fox & Friends co-host Brian Kilmeade criticized Trump for not condemning white supremacy, saying that Trump "ruined the biggest layup in the history of debates" by not doing so. Trump's team disagreed with these criticisms, arguing that Trump has "continuously denounced" white supremacists and did so twice during the debate. The day after the debate, Trump said, "I don't know who Proud Boys are, but whoever they are, they have to stand down." On October 1, Trump said on Sean Hannity's show: "I've said it many times, and let me be clear again: I condemn the KKK. I condemn all white supremacists. I condemn the Proud Boys. I don't know much about the Proud Boys, almost nothing. But I condemn that." Researcher Rita Katz, executive director of SITE Intelligence Group, told The Washington Post that Proud Boys memberships on Telegram channels grew nearly 10 percent after the debate. Proud Boys merchandise featuring the phrases "stand back" and "stand by" appeared online after the debate and was subsequently banned from sites including Amazon Marketplace and Teespring; it remained available on eBay as of October 1.

The debate had a total of at least 73.1 million viewers on television, according to Nielsen ratings. It was the third most watched debate in U.S. history, behind the first debate between Trump and Hillary Clinton in 2016 (84 million), and the only debate between Jimmy Carter and Ronald Reagan in 1980 (80.6 million). The television viewership declined 13% compared to the debate for the first presidential debate of 2016, but an unknown number of people watched or listened to the debate via live-streaming or radio, so the total audience likely surpassed the 2016 record.

Total television viewers (broadcast vs cable)

Legend

cable news network
broadcast network

Total television viewers

Network	Viewers
FNC	17,812,000
ABC	12,620,000
NBC	9,666,000
CNN	8,287,000
MSNBC	7,189,000
CBS	6,379,000
Fox	5,436,000

Viewers 25 to 54

Network	Viewers
FNC	5,308,000
ABC	4,886,000
NBC	4,114,000
CNN	3,524,000
Fox	2,473,000
CBS	2,185,000
MSNBC	1,726,000

== October 7: Vice presidential debate (University of Utah) ==
Vice presidential debate
- Date(s): October 7, 2020
- Duration: 90 minutes
- Venue: Kingsbury Hall at University of Utah
- Location: Salt Lake City, Utah
- Participants: Mike Pence; Kamala Harris
- Footage: C-SPAN
- Moderator(s): Susan Page of USA Today
- Transcript
- Fact checking: FactCheck.org; BBC News; The New York Times
- Website: debate2020.utah.edu

The only vice presidential debate between Vice President Mike Pence and Senator Kamala Harris took place on Wednesday, October 7, 2020, at Kingsbury Hall at the University of Utah in Salt Lake City, Utah. The debate was moderated by Susan Page of USA Today.

=== Changes due to COVID-19 ===
After President Trump and a number of White House individuals tested positive for COVID-19, it was announced that Pence and Harris would stand 12 feet apart. On October 5, the Commission on Presidential Debates approved the use of plexiglass, but the next day, it said that the candidates and moderator would each be allowed to choose whether they wanted such a barrier near their own body. A commission member argued that Harris "is the one who wanted plexiglass...If [Pence] doesn't want plexiglass, that is up to him." Pence subsequently agreed to a plexiglass barrier, so there were two barriers; one by each candidate.

=== Format and debate ===
The debate was to be divided into nine 10-minute segments, although the moderator was only able to ask candidates about eight topics. The candidates were positioned 12 feet and 3 inches apart.

During the debate, Pence echoed many of Trump's false or misleading claims, including on topics such as the COVID-19 pandemic (Pence inaccurately said that the administration had "always" been truthful about the pandemic), health care (Pence inaccurately claimed that he and Trump had a plan to "improve health care and to protect pre-existing conditions for every American," when no such plan has been put forth by the administration), and universal mail-in voting (Pence inaccurately claimed that this system would "create a massive opportunity for voter fraud," a claim contrary to numerous studies). Pence also misrepresented the findings of the Mueller investigation, as well as Biden's position on fracking and the Green New Deal. To a lesser degree, Harris also made statements that were misleading or lacked context, mostly relating to the U.S. economy.

During the debate, moderator Susan Page asked both vice presidential candidates whether they had discussed, or reached an agreement with their running mates, "about safeguards or procedures when it comes to presidential disability." The issue had come to prominence due to the age of both presidential candidates (both were in their 70s) and Trump's hospitalization with COVID-19 earlier that same month. Both Pence and Harris dodged the question and instead pivoted to other topics.

When Harris was asked if she would support an expansion of the number of justices on the Supreme Court if the Senate confirmed Trump's nomination of Amy Coney Barrett to the Court, she did not answer the question, instead mentioning how President Abraham Lincoln did not nominate a successor for Justice Roger B. Taney, as he had died 27 days before the 1864 presidential election. Toward the end of the debate, Pence refused to commit to accepting the results of the election, and ensuring a peaceful transition of power, if Trump and Pence lost. Pence's response echoed Trump's own repeated statements refusing to commit to honoring the results if he loses.

A fly landed on Pence's head during the debate and Pence's left eye appeared bloodshot, attracting commentary and spawning internet memes and a popular Halloween costume, as well as speculation that he might have had COVID-19 at the time.

Shortly after the debate, the candidates' spouses joined them onstage. Harris's husband Douglas Emhoff wore a face mask, while Pence's wife Karen Pence did not, in apparent violation of a Commission on Presidential Debates rule requiring that every attendee, except the candidates and moderator, wear a mask while in the debate hall. Following a backlash, a spokesman for Karen Pence stated that she had "followed an agreement established between both campaigns prior to the debate."

=== Reception ===
Debate winner
Outlet	Harris	Pence	Not sure
CNN	59%	38%	3%

A CNN instant-poll found that 59% of viewers believed Harris had won while 38% thought Pence won.

Pundits had mixed views on the performances of Pence and Harris. FiveThirtyEight reported the debate didn't appear to move the needle for either presidential ticket nor did it shift who people thought would win the election, but a slight increase in enthusiasm was observed among the supporters of both campaigns. An Ipsos survey found Harris's performance was seen as more impressive than Pence's among viewers, with 69% of viewers saying Harris's performance was either "somewhat good" or "very good," compared to 60% of viewers saying the same for Pence.

The debate had a total of 57.9 million viewers on TV and had the second-largest television audience of any U.S. vice presidential debate; it was watched by an estimated 22 million more people than the amount who watched the 2016 vice presidential debate, falling behind the only debate between Sarah Palin and Joe Biden in 2008.

Total television viewers (broadcast vs cable)

Legend

cable news network
broadcast network

Total television viewers

Network	Viewership
FNC	11,898,000
ABC	9,832,000
CNN	7,705,000
MSNBC	6,918,000
NBC	6,802,000
CBS	5,382,000
Fox	4,299,000

Viewers 25 to 54

Network	Viewership
ABC	3,407,000
FNC	3,097,000
CNN	2,924,000
NBC	2,590,000
CBS	1,767,000
Fox	1,758,000
MSNBC	1,480,000

=== The fly ===
Joe Biden
(@JoeBiden)
tweeted:

Pitch in $5 to help this campaign fly. https://joe.link/3nvsFwL

8 October 2020

During the debate, a housefly landed on Pence's head. The moment became viral and spawned many Internet memes. On Twitter, "the fly" was tweeted and retweeted over 700,000 times in the following days, and many accounts were created identifying as the fly. The domain flywillvote.com was obtained by the Biden campaign, and merchandise themed on the incident was created. Joe Biden made a tweet promoting his own campaign with an image of him holding a fly swatter.

According to Alvaro Romero, an associate professor of urban entomology at New Mexico State University, flies have a tendency for landing on white objects, and the fly at the debate may have been attracted to Pence's white hair. The New York Times reported that the fly "ruined" Pence's image and undermined his perceived competence as somebody that could become United States president. Additionally, The Washington Post drew comparisons between the event and the symbolism of flies in Western art, pointing out that they represent death, rot, decay, and corruption, potentially mirroring common perceptions of the Trump–Pence 2020 campaign as a whole.

== Canceled October 15 presidential debate (Arsht Center) ==
Presidential debate
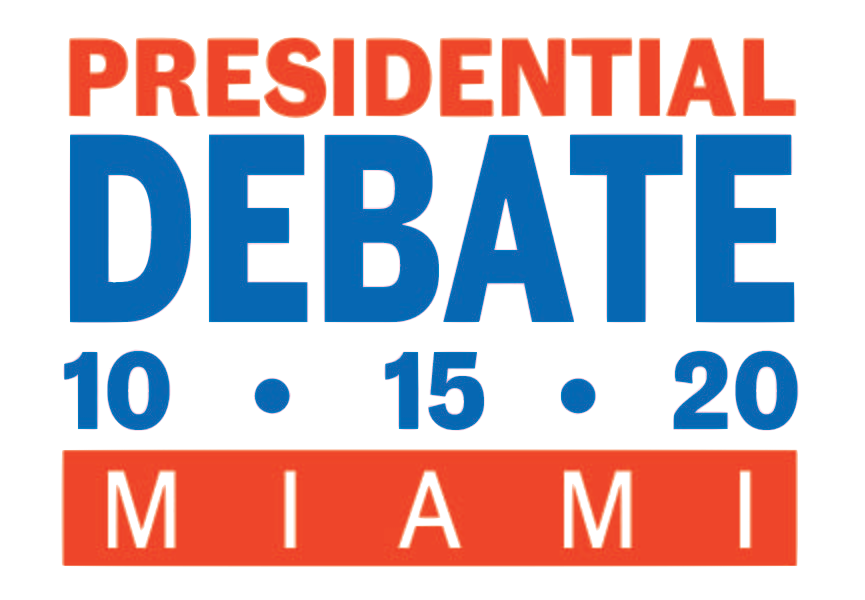
- Date(s): October 15, 2020 (canceled)
- Venue: Adrienne Arsht Center for the Performing Arts
- Location: Miami, Florida
- Website: www.arshtcenter.org

The second presidential debate between President Donald Trump and former Vice President Joe Biden was originally scheduled to take place on Thursday, October 15, 2020, at the Arsht Center in Miami, Florida. This debate had originally been scheduled to be held at the Crisler Center at the University of Michigan in Ann Arbor, Michigan, but the University of Michigan withdrew as a host on June 23, 2020, over public health concerns stemming from the COVID-19 pandemic. The town hall style debate would have been moderated by Steve Scully of C-SPAN.

=== Trump contracts COVID-19 ===
On the morning of October 2, the White House press office announced that the president had contracted COVID-19. One of his close advisers, Hope Hicks, had shown symptoms on the plane while returning from the first debate, and subsequently tested positive. Trump, along with First Lady Melania Trump, tested positive shortly afterwards and went into quarantine. The president was hospitalized for three days. The second debate would have been within the CDC's recommended quarantine period of two weeks. The Commission on Presidential Debates did not immediately specify if Trump's diagnosis would affect the second debate.

=== Change of format ===
On October 8, the Commission on Presidential Debates announced that, due to Trump's positive COVID diagnosis, the second debate would be held virtually, with the moderator in Miami and the candidates participating remotely. Biden agreed to participate in the debate, but Trump said he would not take part in a virtual debate and would instead hold a rally. Trump's campaign team attempted to "push the October 15 debate back a week to October 22 and then move the third debate to October 29". A Biden campaign spokesperson stated, regarding Trump's declination to participate in a virtual debate, that "Biden would be happy to appear virtually, but said if the president declines to appear, the former vice president will hold a town hall elsewhere." The Biden campaign later scheduled a nationally televised town hall on ABC with George Stephanopoulos on October 15.

Trump's physician Sean Conley said on October 8 that Trump's condition was stable and that he was "devoid of symptoms"; however, that evening Trump appeared by phone on Hannity and suffered several coughing fits. Conley said that he anticipated that Trump could have a "safe return to public engagements" by October 10, ten days after his diagnosis. According to the CDC, people with COVID-19 remain contagious for up to 20 days after their onset of symptoms, depending on the severity of the case; Trump's treatment using remdesivir and dexamethasone was typical of a severe case. The Trump campaign called for the second debate to be held in person as originally scheduled, saying there was "no medical reason" for the debate to be shifted to a virtual setting, postponed, or otherwise changed "in any way." However, Fahrenkopf said that the commission would not reconsider its decision to make the event virtual so as to "protect the health and safety of all involved."

=== Steve Scully incident ===
Prior to the debate, Trump said in a phone interview with Fox News' Sean Hannity that would-be debate moderator Scully was a "Never Trumper". He later reiterated these comments in a tweet saying "Steve Scully, the second Debate Moderator, is a Never Trumper, just like the son of the great Mike Wallace. Fix!!!". On October 9, shortly after these comments were made, a tweet was made by Scully appearing to ask former Trump White House communications director Anthony Scaramucci about advice on how to handle Trump in the debates. It was believed by many that this was meant to be a direct message rather than a public tweet. Afterwards, Scully claimed that his Twitter account had been hacked which was later proven to be false. On October 15, he was suspended indefinitely for lying about these comments.

=== Cancelation ===
The commission announced on October 9 that the second debate had been canceled while the final debate would still proceed as originally planned, with Kristen Welker moderating. As a result of the debate cancelation, each candidate participated in separate town hall events televised at the same time (8:00 p.m. EDT). Biden's town hall was broadcast on ABC, moderated by George Stephanopoulos and Trump's town hall was broadcast on NBC, moderated by Savannah Guthrie. Biden's town hall was watched by 14.1 million people on ABC, while Trump's town hall was watched by 13.5 million people on NBC. More people watched Biden's town hall, broadcast solely on ABC, than Trump's town hall, broadcast on NBC and two of its cable channels, MSNBC and CNBC.

Columbia Journalism Review editor and publisher Kyle Pope characterized the duelling events as "a craven ratings stunt". During the 1968 United States presidential election, Richard Nixon refused to debate Hubert Humphrey, also resulting in separate late-night television events: fundraising telethons were scheduled for mostly-overlapping time slots with the Democratic candidate similarly appearing on ABC and the Republican candidate on NBC.

== October 22: Second presidential debate (Belmont University) ==
Second presidential debate
- Date(s): October 22, 2020
- Duration: 93 minutes
- Venue: Curb Event Center at Belmont University
- Location: Nashville, Tennessee
- Participants: Donald Trump; Joe Biden
- Footage: CNN
- Moderator(s): Kristen Welker of NBC
- Transcript
- Fact checking: FactCheck.org; CNN; CBS News; The New York Times
- Website: belmontdebate2020.com

The second and final presidential debate between President Donald Trump and former Vice President Joe Biden took place on Thursday, October 22, 2020, at the Curb Event Center at Belmont University in Nashville, Tennessee. The debate was moderated by Kristen Welker of NBC. This would have been the third debate, but became only the second, following the cancelation of the October 15 debate.

=== Format and debate ===
In response to the interruptions that occurred during the first debate, the Commission on Presidential Debates announced on October 19 that each candidate's microphone would be muted during the other's initial two-minute response to each question. The announcement also stated that after each candidate gave his two-minute response, the microphones would not be muted. The muting was performed by production staff instead of the moderator.

The debate was divided into six segments: "fighting COVID-19, American families, race in America, climate change, national security, and leadership". On the COVID-19 pandemic, Trump claimed that a vaccine would be released in the next few weeks, while Biden criticized Trump for his lack of action (along with the lack of a plan) to contain the virus. Referring to Trump, Biden said, "This is the same fellow who told you this was going to end by Easter last time. This is the same fellow who said, 'Don't worry, we're going to end it this by the summer.' We're about to go into a dark winter [...] and he has no clear plan." Biden also said that there was "no prospect" that a vaccine would be "available for the majority of the American people" before mid-2021. Trump responded by saying that Americans had to learn to live with the virus; Biden replied that, under Trump, Americans were "learning to die from" the virus. Asked whether he took responsibility for his actions, Trump said, "I take full responsibility. It's not my fault that it came here. It's China's fault." While Trump stated that he would re-open the country as soon as possible, Biden stated that he would do it with certain restrictions.

On national security, the candidates were asked about the recently released Director of National Intelligence report about interference in the ongoing election by Russia and Iran. Biden described foreign electoral interference as an interference with American sovereignty, specifically referencing Russia, China, and Iran, and said that any country that interfered in U.S. elections would "pay a price." Biden also expressed concerns over Russian misinformation sent to Rudy Giuliani, whom he called a "Russian pawn". Trump responded by falsely claiming that Biden had received money from the Mayor of Moscow.

After Biden brought up newly reported information about Trump's tax returns, as well as Trump's secret bank account in China, Trump stated that he prepaid millions in taxes and complained that the IRS had treated him "very unfairly." Biden replied, "Release your tax returns, or stop talking about corruption." On the topic of North Korea, Trump said that he had a "good relationship" with Kim Jong-un and that because of that, "there's no war." On his turn, Biden stated that the nuclear weapons in North Korea were still a problem for the US and criticized Trump's friendship with Kim, whom Biden called a "thug".

On healthcare and the Affordable Care Act (ACA or "Obamacare"), Trump said, "I would like to terminate Obamacare, come up with a brand new, beautiful health care" that would be "better" and reaffirmed his support for a lawsuit to invalidate the ACA. Trump offered no replacement plan. Biden said he would build on and improve the ACA, adding a public health insurance option in addition to existing private plans. Trump compared Biden's plan to that of Bernie Sanders, while falsely claiming that Biden's plan would be "socialized medicine".

On proposals for a new round of coronavirus economic relief legislation, Trump blamed Democratic Speaker of the House Nancy Pelosi for the failure of relief legislation to pass, although Pelosi was in the midst of negotiating a relief bill with Trump's Treasury Secretary Steven Mnuchin. Biden reminded viewers that the Democratic-led House had passed a coronavirus relief months ago, and that the legislation was not taken up in the Republican-controlled Senate. Biden asked Trump why he was not conferring with his "Republican friends" about an agreement. (Republican Senate Majority Leader Mitch McConnell has urged the Trump White House not to make an agreement with Pelosi before the election.) Trump said that he opposed the bill passed by House Democrats in part because it included funds for Democratic-led local government. Trump called the House Democrats' bill "a big bailout for badly run Democratic cities and states." In response, Biden stressed unity, saying, "Look what he's doing. Blue states or red states — they're all the United States." Biden noted that every state was experiencing fiscal stress due to the economic downturn, saying that in the absence of relief, budget shortfalls would force the state governments, "whether red or blue," to "start laying off [...] cops, firefighters, first responders, teachers." Speaking after the debate, Biden said that, if elected, he would work with state and local leaders on a relief bill during the transition.

On proposals to raise the federal minimum wage from the current $7.25 an hour to $15 an hour, Biden reaffirmed his support for the increase, while Trump said that the minimum wage should be left to the states and that a federal minimum wage increase would hurt businesses.

On immigration and the Trump administration policy of separating children from their parents at the border (a policy that the administration halted after an international outcry), Trump dodged the question, falsely claiming that his administration had inherited the policy that led to the separation of thousands of families from the Obama administration. An impassioned Biden condemned the Trump administration policy and said that it was "criminal" that 545 children separated under the policy have still not been reunited with their parents.

On the topic of race in America, both candidates were asked to address Black parents about "the talk", in which Black parents talk to their children about racism in the United States. While Biden addressed the public, Trump asserted that Biden had caused harm to the African-American community during his time as a senator. Trump claimed that he had done more for the African-American community than any other president except possibly Abraham Lincoln, and that he was the "least racist person in this room", to which Biden mockingly said "Abraham Lincoln over here is one of the most racist Presidents in modern history".

On climate change, Trump pointed to the fact that the US had the lowest carbon emissions numbers since the 1990s and claimed that the air in China, Russia, and India was "filthy". On his turn, Biden proposed a plan to combat global warming by transitioning the country from fossil fuels to renewable energy, saying this shift would create millions of jobs. In his response, Trump claimed that he knew more about wind energy than Biden and that "wind [turbines] kill all the birds."

The moderator asked Trump, "Some people of color are much more likely to live near oil refineries and chemical plants in Texas. There are families who worry the plants near them are making them sick. Your administration has rolled back regulations on these kinds of facilities. Why should these families give you another four years in office?" This marked the first time that environmental justice issues were discussed in a general election debate. Trump replied that the plants give them good sources of employment, while Biden stressed expressed support for regulating pollutants that negatively affect fenceline communities. When both were asked about the future of energy, Trump emphasized economic priorities, while Biden stressed alternate forms of energy and said he wanted to "transition from the oil industry."

In the final segment (on "leadership") both candidates were asked what they would say on their inauguration day to the Americans who did not vote for them. Trump focused on the state of the economy, while Biden said that he would promise to represent every American in the country, "choose science over fiction", create new jobs, and give Americans the even chance that they "haven't been getting for the last four years."

=== Reception ===
Debate winner
Outlet	Biden	Trump	Not sure
CNN/SSRS	53%	39%	8%

A post-debate CNN/SSRS poll found that 53% of debate-viewers thought that Biden had won and 39% thought Trump had, with a margin of error of 5.7 points. The debate was generally praised for its less hostile nature and for the candidates being prompted to go into more detail about their proposals. FiveThirtyEight opined that the debate did not have a major impact on either candidate's favorability, polling numbers, or likelihood of winning. The second and final presidential debate was watched by 63 million people, an estimated 10 million fewer people than the amount who watched the first debate, and 8.6 million fewer than the number who watched the final debate of 2016. This was likely due to the debate being broadcast concurrently with Thursday Night Football, which accumulated a total of 7 million viewers on FOX.

Total television viewers (broadcast vs cable)

Legend

cable news network
broadcast network

Total television viewers

Network	Viewers
FNC	15,405,000
ABC	9,770,000
NBC	8,985,000
CNN	7,508,000
MSNBC	6,929,000
CBS	4,863,000

Viewers 25 to 54

Network	Viewers
FNC	4,385,000
ABC	4,059,000
NBC	4,099,000
CNN	3,019,000
CBS	2,031,000
MSNBC	1,584,000

Total Viewers (25 - 54)

== See also ==
- Donald Trump 2020 presidential campaign
- Joe Biden 2020 presidential campaign
- 2020 United States presidential election
