= Chris Wallace =

American journalist (born 1947)

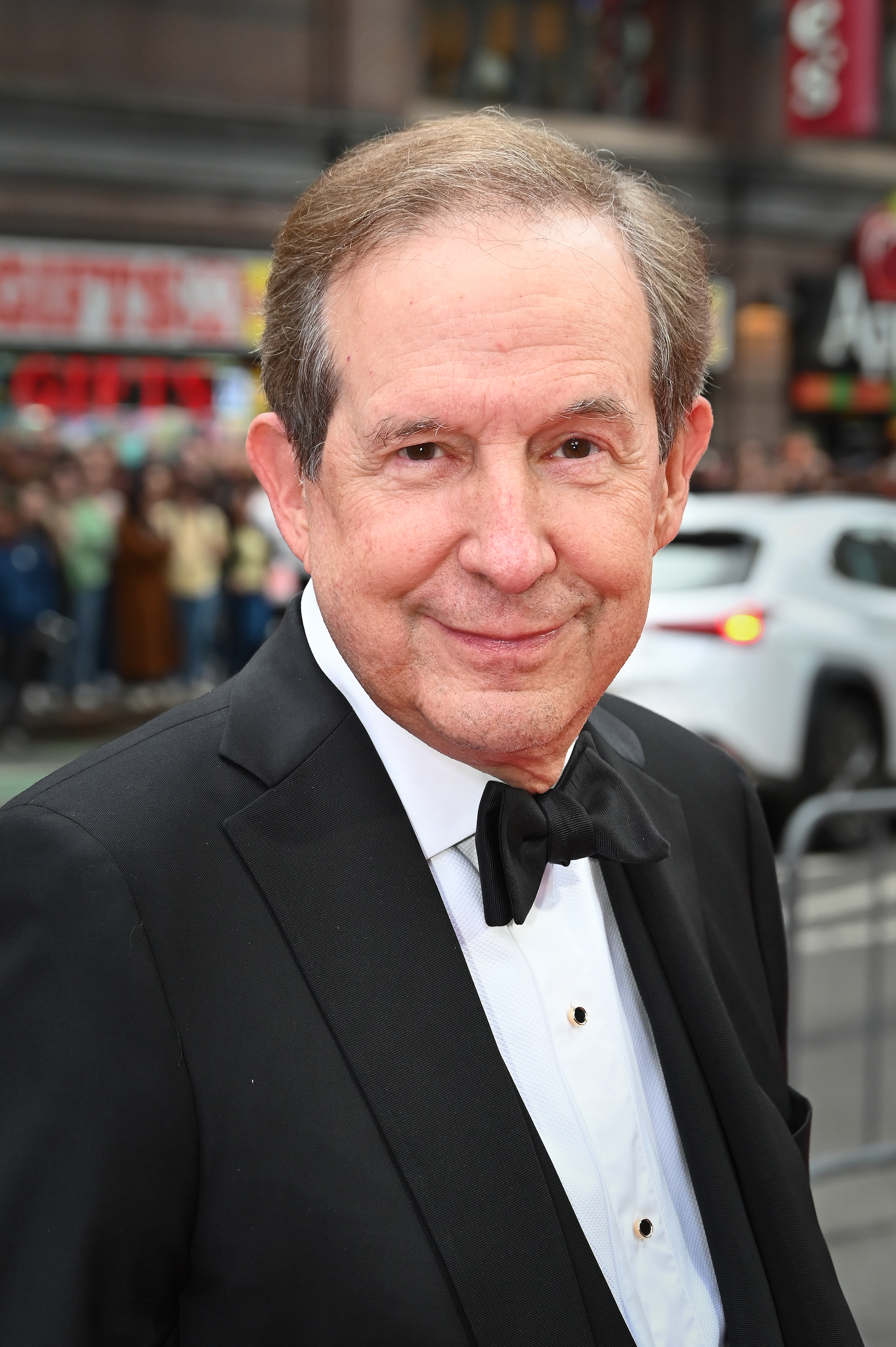
- Wallace at the premiere of Good Night, and Good Luck in 2025
- Born: Christopher Wallace; October 12, 1947 (age 79); Chicago, Illinois, U.S.
- Education: Harvard University (BA)
- Occupations: Television journalist; news anchor
- Years active: 1964–present
- Notable credits: NBC Nightly News (1982–87); Meet the Press (1987–88); ABC Primetime (1989–2003); Fox News Sunday (2003–21); Who's Talking to Chris Wallace? (2022–24); The Chris Wallace Show (2023–24)
- Spouses: Elizabeth Jane Farrell (m. 1973, divorced); Lorraine (Martin) Smothers (m. 1997)
- Children: 6
- Parents: Mike Wallace (father); Norma Kaphan (mother)

Christopher Wallace (born October 12, 1947) is an American broadcast journalist. He is known for his tough and wide-ranging interviews, for which he is often compared to his father, 60 Minutes journalist Mike Wallace. Over his 60-year career in journalism he has been a correspondent, moderator, or anchor on CBS, ABC, NBC, Fox News, and CNN. In 2018, he was ranked one of America's most trusted television news anchors. He has won three Emmy Awards, a Peabody Award, a George Polk Award, the duPont-Columbia University Silver Baton Award.

Wallace was honored with a Star on the Hollywood Walk of Fame in 2025. He has donated the papers and videotapes from his 55-year career in journalism to the Dolph Briscoe Center for American History at the University of Texas in Austin.

As a teenager, Wallace became an assistant to Walter Cronkite during the 1964 Republican National Convention. After graduating from Harvard University, he worked as a national reporter for The Boston Globe. He transitioned towards broadcast news at NBC (1975–1988), where he served as a White House correspondent, the Sunday anchor for NBC Nightly News (1982–1984, 1986–1987) and moderator of Meet the Press (1987–1988). He then worked for ABC, where he served as an anchor for Primetime Thursday and Nightline (1989–2003). He is the only person to have served as host and moderator of more than one of the major American political Sunday morning talk shows, which he did during his time at NBC.

From 2003 to 2021, he hosted Fox News Sunday and took high profile interviews with Barack Obama, Donald Trump, and Vladimir Putin. He made history when he became the first Fox News journalist to moderate a United States presidential debate, doing so in 2016 between Trump and Hillary Clinton. He returned to moderate the 2020 debate between Trump and Joe Biden. In 2021, he left Fox to join CNN as host of the interview series Who's Talking to Chris Wallace? (2022–2024) and anchored The Chris Wallace Show (2023–2024). In November 2024, Wallace left CNN following the expiration of his three-year contract.

== Early life and education ==
Wallace was born in Chicago, Illinois, to longtime CBS 60 Minutes reporter Mike Wallace and Norma Kaphan. Wallace is Jewish; both his parents were Jewish. He was named Christopher because he was born on Columbus Day. He had an elder brother, Peter (1942–1962), who died at the age of 19 after a mountain climbing accident. His parents divorced when he was one year old; he grew up with his mother and stepfather Bill Leonard, President of CBS News. Leonard gave him early exposure to political journalism, hiring him as an assistant to Walter Cronkite at the 1964 Republican National Convention. Wallace did not develop a relationship with his father, Mike, until the age of 14. Wallace attended the Hotchkiss School and Harvard College. He first reported news on-air for WHRB, the student radio station at Harvard. He memorably covered the 1969 student occupation of University Hall and was detained by Cambridge policemen, using his one phone call to sign off a report from Cambridge City Jail with "This is Chris Wallace from WHRB News reporting from Middlesex County Jail in custody."

== Career ==
=== Career beginnings: The Boston Globe ===
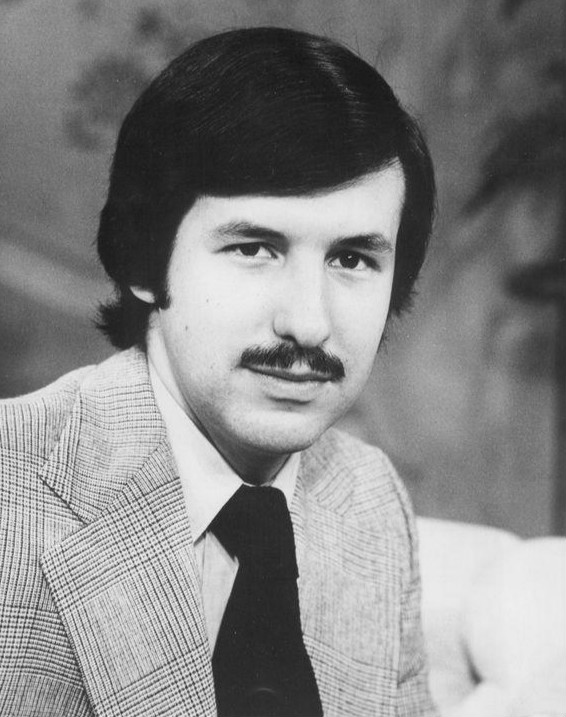
Wallace as a reporter for WBBM-TV, 1975

Although accepted at Yale Law School, he decided to work for The Boston Globe, where his boss described him as an "aggressive and ambitious reporter". He first covered City Hall during the time Kevin White was mayor of Boston and later became a roving national reporter. Wallace noticed the power of television when he saw all the reporters at the 1972 political conventions were watching the proceedings on television instead of in person. For a time in the early 1970s, he worked for the Chicago station WBBM-TV, which is owned and operated by CBS.

=== 1975–1988: Network journalism debut at NBC News ===
After seeing the impact television had on news at the 1972 Republican National Convention, he focused on working on broadcast news, first at NBC (1975–1988). Wallace began his network journalism career with NBC in 1975, where he stayed for 14 years as a reporter with WNBC-TV in New York City. Wallace then transferred to NBC's Washington bureau as a political correspondent for NBC News and later served as Washington co-anchor and news reader for the Today show with Bryant Gumbel and Jane Pauley in 1982. That same year, he also served as chief White House correspondent (1982–1989) alongside contemporaries CBS's Lesley Stahl and ABC's Sam Donaldson. He later served as anchor of the Sunday edition of NBC Nightly News (1982–1984, 1986–1987), and moderator of Meet the Press (1987–1988).

On May 18, 1985, as part of an NBC News special, Wallace did a joint interview with Ronald Reagan and Nancy Reagan at Camp David. Some journalists have described Wallace's style as confrontational. During President Ronald Reagan's news conference in March 1987, when Reagan admitted to dealing arms for hostages, Wallace asked Reagan why he had denied that Israel was involved with the arms sales to Iran "when you knew that wasn't true." In 1988, Wallace covered the 1988 Republican National Convention for NBC News, where he interviewed political figures, including real estate tycoon Donald Trump questioning him about flirting with running for political office.

=== 1989–2003: ABC News correspondent ===
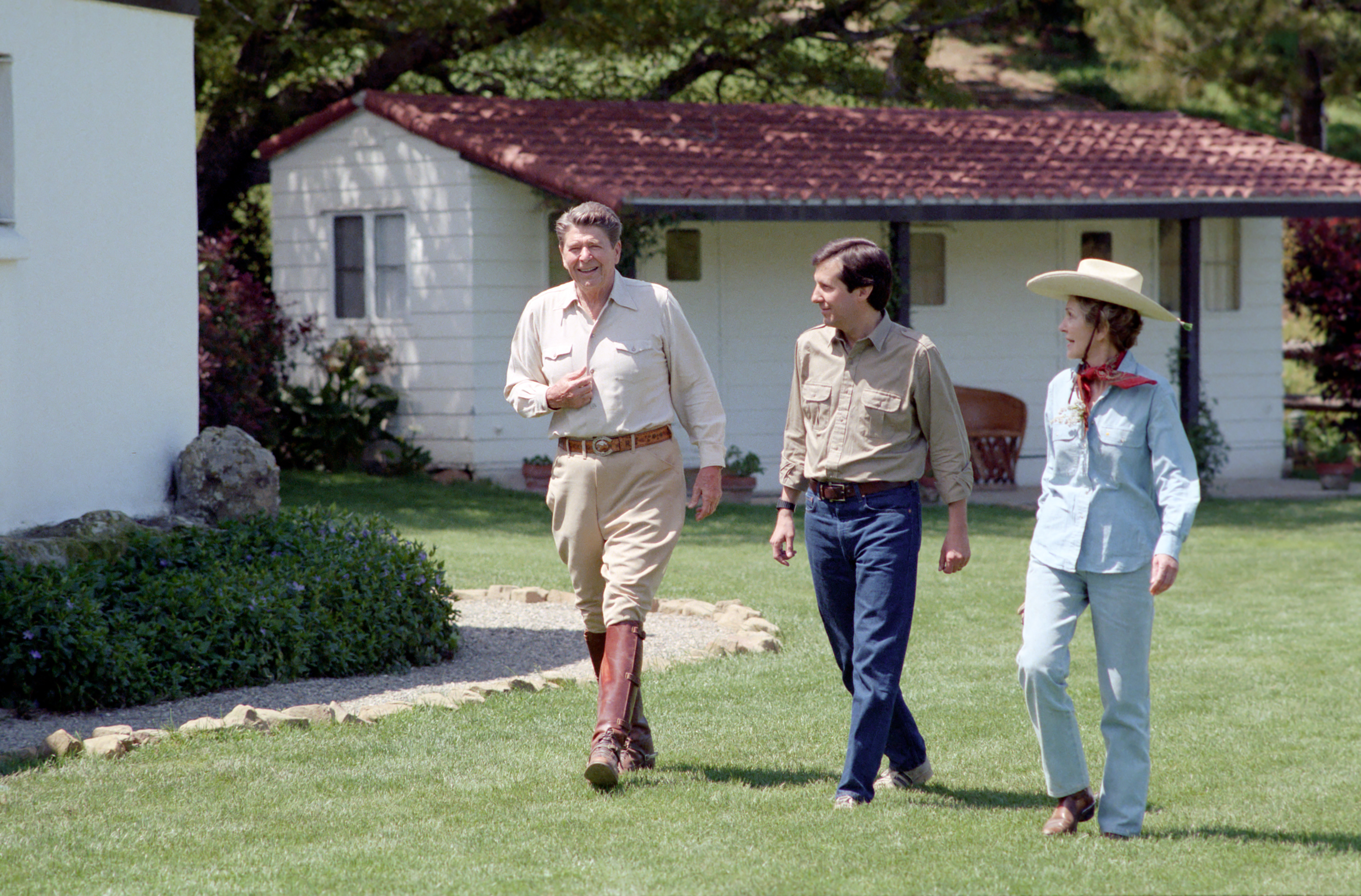
Wallace with Ronald Reagan and Nancy Reagan in 1985

Wallace left NBC in late 1988 for ABC. Sam Donaldson, ABC's outgoing chief White House correspondent, said he was "delighted" and "very pleased" that Wallace, his journalistic rival, would be joining the network saying, "I've always liked his work, I think he's going to be a plus." At ABC News, Wallace was the senior correspondent for Primetime Live and occasionally hosted Nightline. During the Persian Gulf War in 1991, he reported from Tel Aviv on the Iraqi Scud missile attacks. At the time, the Israeli government did not want to advertise where the Scuds landed to prevent the Iraqis from adjusting their launchers. On one episode of Nightline, Wallace started describing the location where a Scud missile landed in Tel Aviv. Host Ted Koppel cut him off and asked him to point to a general area rather than give a specific location.

=== 2003–2021: Fox News and presidential debates ===
==== Fox News Sunday ====
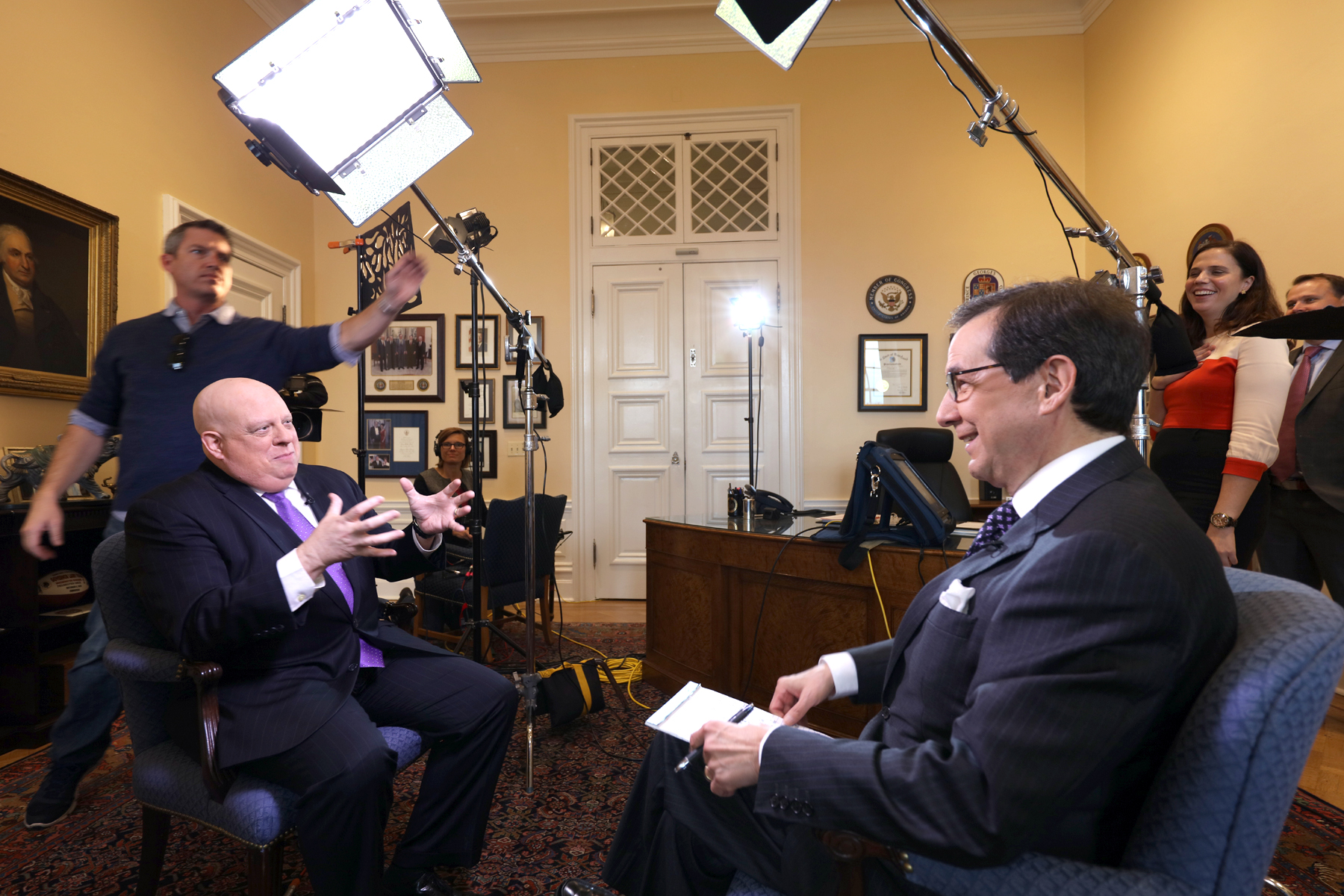
Wallace interviews Maryland governor Larry Hogan in 2015.

After 14 years at ABC, Wallace left in 2003 to join Fox News. Wallace began hosting Fox News Sunday with Chris Wallace in 2003 after replacing Tony Snow. Wallace and Shepard Smith gained a reputation at Fox for their reputable status as journalists on the network. In an interview with the Chicago Tribune, Howard Kurtz wrote, "Fox seems to be inching toward more conventional journalism." When asked about his political opinions, Wallace stated, "Do I have political opinions? Absolutely. But I vote for the person, and I've voted for Republicans and Democrats and independents over the course of my life. I feel very strongly that you try not to let that affect the way you report the news." Fox News Chairman Roger Ailes called Wallace "one of the best interviewers in the business. ... I have no idea what he thinks personally, but he asks tough questions of everybody."

Throughout his 18 years at Fox, Wallace had participated in coverage of nearly every major political event and secured several high-profile interviews with dignitaries and U.S. leaders. In February 2009, he secured Fox's first interview with President Barack Obama. On March 3, 2016, Wallace joined Bret Baier, and Megyn Kelly in moderating the 2016 Republican Party Presidential debate on Fox News. In 2017, he interviewed President Donald Trump in his first interview since being elected.

==== Debates, coverage, and interviews ====
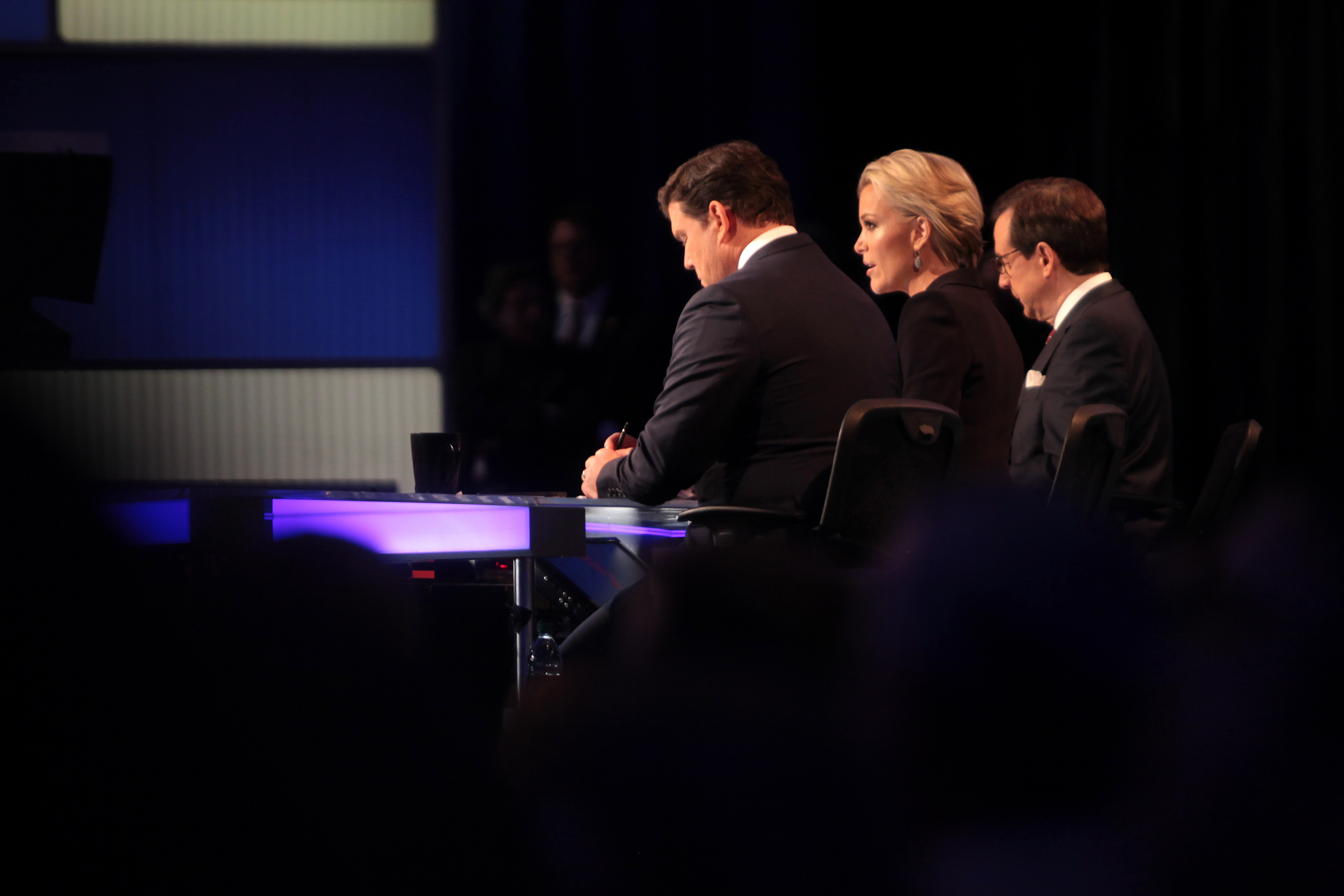
Bret Baier, Megyn Kelly, and Chris Wallace moderating the 2016 Republican Party Presidential debate

The Commission on Presidential Debates selected Chris Wallace as moderator of the third and final 2016 Presidential debate between Donald Trump and Hillary Clinton. The debate was held on October 19, 2016, at the University of Nevada, Las Vegas. This was the first time a Fox News anchor had moderated a general election presidential debate. After he was selected, Wallace said, "it's not my job" to fact-check candidates, but that it was the job of the opposing candidate. Wallace stated, "I take it very seriously, this is not a TV show. This is part of civics, the constitution, if you will, in action, because this is helping millions of people decide who we're going to elect as the next president".

He received notable praise from both sides of the aisle for his tough questioning of both presidential candidates at that last presidential debate of the 2016 election. Afterward, Jennifer Rubin in The Washington Post said that, despite her strong disapproval of other Fox News commentators, "No one could watch the final debate and deny that Chris Wallace is among the best in the business." The New York Times wrote, "Mr. Wallace mixed humor with scolding and persistence with patience to guide his charges toward the most substantive encounter of an unusually vicious election."

==== Interview with Vladimir Putin (2018) ====
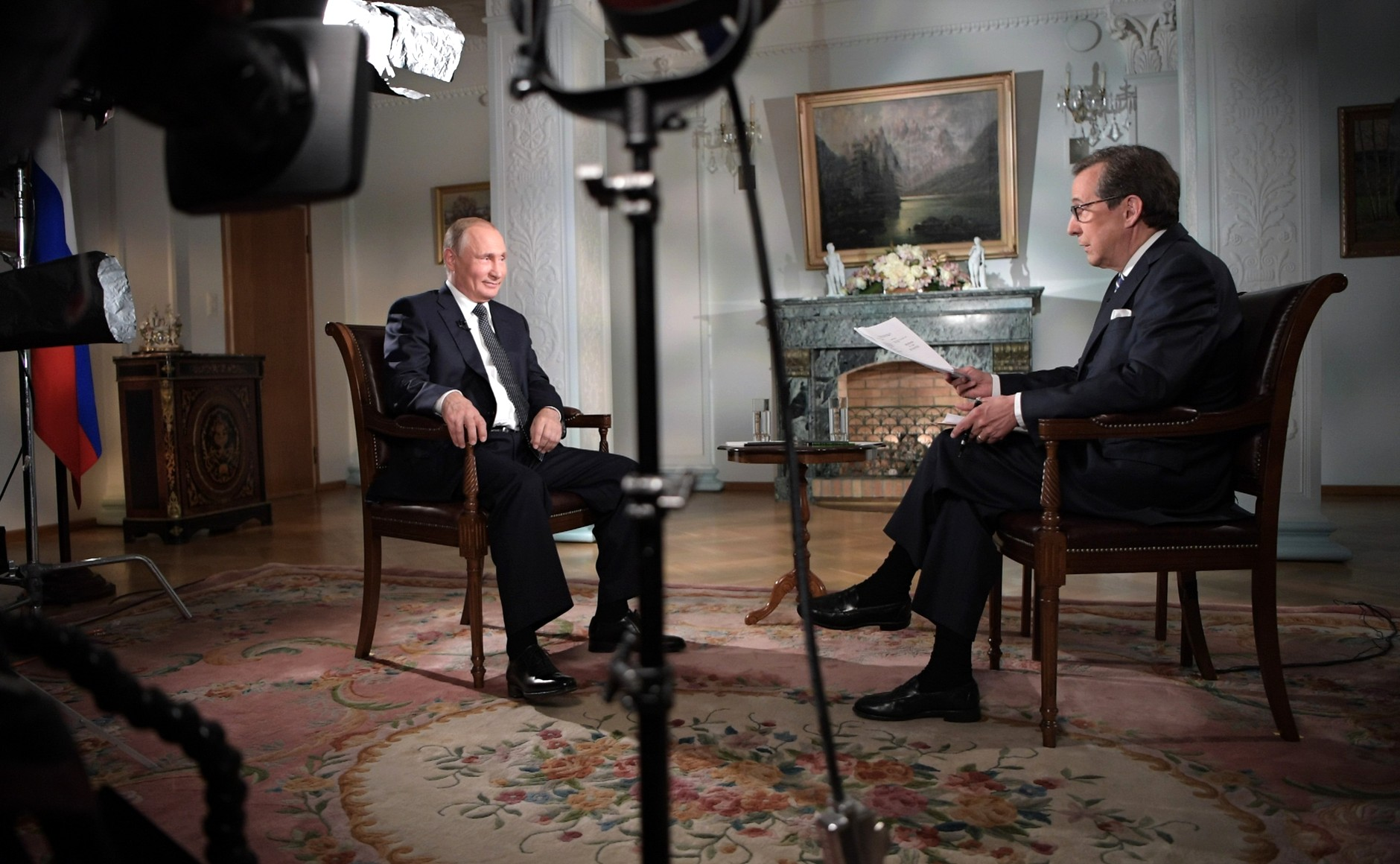
Wallace interviewing Vladimir Putin in 2018

In July 2018, Wallace interviewed Russian leader Vladimir Putin. Wallace questioned Putin about why so many of his political opponents end up dead, and sought to hand Putin papers containing the indictment of 12 Russian agents for interference in the 2016 election. Putin declined to touch the papers. According to The Washington Post's Aaron Blake, Putin was "clearly frustrated by a journalist actually challenging him". According to The New York Times, Wallace's interview was "widely praised". His interview earned him a News & Documentary Emmy Award nomination for Outstanding Live Interview. However, the winner was Christiane Amanpour via CNN International’s Amanpour, in which she interviewed the Archbishop of New York Cardinal Timothy Dolan. It was the first News & Documentary Award nomination in Fox News' history.

==== Coverage of the Kavanaugh hearings ====
In September 2018, Wallace covered the Supreme Court hearings for Brett Kavanaugh, during which Kavanaugh was accused of sexual assault by multiple women, including Christine Blasey Ford. Wallace described Ford's testimony as "extremely emotional, extremely raw, and extremely credible...nobody could listen to her deliver those words and talk about the assault and the impact it had had on his life, on her life, and not have your heart go out to her. She obviously was traumatized by an event." He also described the cross-examination format as "a disaster for the Republicans." When Ford's testimony was criticized by conservative pundits, Wallace discussed how his daughters had related their own previously undisclosed experiences. Wallace said they "hadn't told their parents, I don't know if they told their friends. Certainly had never reported it to police...But the point is that there are teenage girls who don't tell stories to a lot of people, and then it comes up, and I don't think we can disregard that, I don't think we can disregard Christine Blasey Ford and the seriousness of this. I think that would be a big mistake."

==== Coverage of the impeachment of Donald Trump ====
On January 27, 2020, Wallace got into a heated exchange with conservative pundit Katie Pavlich of TownHall.com on Fox News Sunday as to whether or not additional witnesses should be allowed to testify during the 2020 Impeachment trial of Donald Trump in the Senate. Pavlich argued that Republicans should be allowed to deny Democrats the right to call witnesses during the trial citing the 1998 Investigation and Impeachment of Bill Clinton. Wallace objected stating, "So we just shouldn't listen to what John Bolton has to say?", elaborating, "To say in the Clinton investigation, these people who were interviewed by the House — one, they weren't — and to say that it wasn't done by the Justice Department... It wasn't done because the Justice Department refused to carry out the investigation! Get your facts straight!"

==== Interview with Donald Trump (2020) ====
On July 19, 2020, Wallace sat down with President Donald Trump for a wide-ranging interview outside The White House. The interview gained much attention on social media and conventional news outlets for its content. Wallace earned praise for holding Trump accountable and fact-checking him in real time. In the midst of the ongoing nationwide Black Lives Matter protests over the murder of George Floyd, Wallace pressed Trump on his claim that Joe Biden, the presumptive 2020 Democratic presidential nominee wanted to "defund and abolish" the police by replying "No, sir, he does not." In reference to the COVID-19 pandemic, Wallace also challenged Trump on his exaggerated claims concerning the mortality rate and testing for COVID-19. When confronted by the statistics, the President responded: "I'll be right eventually." Many have compared the interview style with that of Wallace's father, 60 Minutes journalist Mike Wallace. This includes Frank Sesno, a professor at George Washington University who teaches a class on "the art of the interview", who stated, "He's very good at this. He's been doing this for a long time. And he's got the Wallace DNA." Many noticed Trump's awkwardness during the interview, including Meghan McCain who stated on The View that, "it was the first time I've really seen President Trump squirm."

==== First presidential debate (2020) ====
The Commission on Presidential Debates (CPD) selected Wallace as moderator of the first presidential debate, held on September 29, 2020, at Case Western Reserve University in Cleveland, Ohio. The debate was deemed a "disaster" by various news pundits for its lack of decorum, civility, and content. During the debate, Wallace tried to gain control numerous times including stopping the debate and telling the candidates, specifically Trump, "So here's the deal...I think the country would be better served if we allowed both people to speak with fewer interruptions, I'm appealing to you sir".

Numerous post debate polls declared Biden the winner of the debate. In response to the debate, Wallace shared his frustration with the President in an interview with Bill Hemmer where he stated that Trump "bears the primary responsibility for what happened" and that "It was frustrating for me because I tried hard to prepare for a serious debate, much more frustrating and more importantly for the American people because they didn't get the debate they wanted that they deserved." Some viewers, including several Fox News personalities, accused Wallace of unfairness towards Trump, though Fox News executives released a statement commending Wallace's "professionalism, skill and fortitude in a unique situation." The CPD also praised Wallace stating, they were "grateful to Chris Wallace for the professionalism and skill he brought to last night's debate" while also stating they intend to ensure that additional tools to maintain order are in place for the remaining debates."

==== 2020 U.S. presidential election ====
On November 3, Wallace joined Brit Hume, Juan Williams, and Dana Perino in Bret Baier and Martha MacCallum's election night coverage of the 2020 presidential election on Fox News. Wallace defended the network's decision to call Arizona for Biden over Trump despite being under tremendous pressure from Trump and his campaign. Later that night, Trump prematurely declared victory in the election, saying: "Frankly, we did win this election," despite there having been too few results received from other states for either Trump or Biden to have won. Trump also stated he wanted "all the voting to stop". Wallace reacted to the President's claim by stating on air: "This is an extremely flammable situation and the president just threw a match into it. He hasn't won these states ... the president doesn't get to say he won states ... there's no question that all these states can continue to count votes." Wallace further condemned Trump's wanting to halt votes from being counted by saying that it was "extremely irresponsible" and that he did not think the courts would allow it.

=== 2022–2024: Transition to CNN and departure ===
On the December 12, 2021, episode of Fox News Sunday, Wallace announced that it would be his final day hosting the program. It was later announced that Wallace had been hired by CNN to host a new program for its streaming service CNN+, which launched in April 2022. Wallace stated the show was inspired by Larry King, Charlie Rose, and his father Mike Wallace. Wallace had complained to Fox management about its opinion hosts, in particular Sean Hannity's and Tucker Carlson's increasing emphasis on untruths about the January 6 United States Capitol attack and the outcome of the 2020 presidential election. Wallace was particularly disturbed by Carlson's special Patriot Purge. He said the work environment at Fox grew "increasingly unsustainable" for him after the 2020 election. In an interview in 2024, he claimed the reason he left Fox was because he had enough of their "lies" and "conspiracies".

Wallace moved to CNN where he served as the host of the interview program Who's Talking to Chris Wallace?. On April 21, 2022, Warner Bros. Discovery, the parent company of CNN and CNN+, announced they were shutting down CNN+, which occurred on April 28. At their Upfront presentation the following month, it was revealed that Who's Talking had gone back into production, and would make its new home at CNN and HBO Max. In its first season Wallace interviewed former Supreme Court Justice Stephen Breyer, actor George Clooney, representative Alexandria Ocasio-Cortez, comedian Billy Crystal, athlete Alex Rodriguez, musician Meghan Trainor, chef José Andrés, and author James Patterson. Other notable interviews throughout the rest of its run were with James Cameron, Hugh Jackman, Harrison Ford, Matt Damon, Bernie Sanders, Charlamagne tha God, Bill Maher, Larry David, and Stephen A. Smith. Following Wallace's departure from CNN, Who's Talking ended on November 15, 2024.

In August 2023, it was announced in a major news programming overhaul that Wallace would host a new CNN Saturday morning program called The Chris Wallace Show from 10 to 11 a.m. Eastern Time Zone. He will continue to host Who's Talking to Chris Wallace?. The program consisted of Wallace and a panel of reporters and commentators discussing the notable political stories of the week. Additional segments included "Yea or Nay", in which panelists gave their approval or disapproval to a new social trend, and "Hit Me with Your Best Shot", in which panelists predicted what the biggest news story would be in the coming weeks. Regular panelists included Lulu Garcia-Navarro, Kara Swisher, Kristin Soltis Anderson, and Reihan Salam. The final episode aired on November 23, 2024.

Despite the network pushing for him to stay, Wallace declined to extend his contract with CNN, and departed the network in November, with plans for an independent venture into streaming or podcasting. Puck News claimed that prior to the announcement of his departure, CNN CEO Mark Thompson had informed Wallace that Who's Talking and The Chris Wallace Show would be cancelled due to low ratings, but that he was welcome to stay on as an analyst on a significantly reduced salary. Wallace denied to Puck that he discussed a future role on CNN, and said that he decided with his wife to leave the network six months before his announcement.

== Media appearances ==
In 2012, Wallace appeared on Jeopardy! during "Power Players Week", which featured journalists, politicians, and television personalities as contestants. He competed against BBC journalist Katty Kay, and television personality Dr. Oz. Wallace won the game with $22,400 to Kay's $8,000 and Oz's $5,900.

In July 2019, Wallace appeared on The Late Show with Stephen Colbert to promote a documentary about his father, Mike Wallace Is Here.

He also stated that in his 50-year career in journalism, his highlights include "spending a week with Mother Teresa in Calcutta", covering Ronald Reagan across the world for ABC News, and interviewing Vladimir Putin in Helsinki, where he asked, "Why do so many people who oppose you end up dead?"

== Accolades and honors ==
In addition to being awarded a Peabody Award and being awarded three News & Documentary Emmy Awards Wallace sits on the Board of Selectors of Jefferson Awards for Public Service. Wallace was honored with a Star on the Hollywood Walk of Fame in 2025.

| Organizations | Year | Award | Result | Ref. |
|---|---|---|---|---|
| George Polk Award in Journalism | 1992 | Foreign reporting for his work on ABC News's Primetime Live | Honored | |
| Columbia University School of Journalism | 1993 | Excellence in Television Journalism Award | Honored | |
| National Press Foundation | 2011 | The Award for Broadcast excellence | Honored | |
| National Press Foundation | 2012 | The Sol Taishoff Award for Excellence in Broadcast Journalism | Honored | |
| Radio Television Digital News Association | 2013 | Paul White lifetime achievement award | Honored | |
| American Academy of Achievement | 2014 | The Golden Plate Award | Honored | |
| International Center for Journalists (ICFJ) | 2017 | The Founders Award for Excellence in Journalism | Honored | |
| Congressional Medal of Honor Society | 2018 | The "Tex" McCrary Journalism Award | Honored | |
| Culture and Media Institute | 2018 | "The Freedom of Speech Award" | Honored | |
| Poynter Institute | 2020 | Lifetime Achievement in Journalism Medal | Honored | |
| Hollywood Walk of Fame | 2025 | Television Star at 6253 Hollywood Boulevard. | Honored | |

== Personal life ==
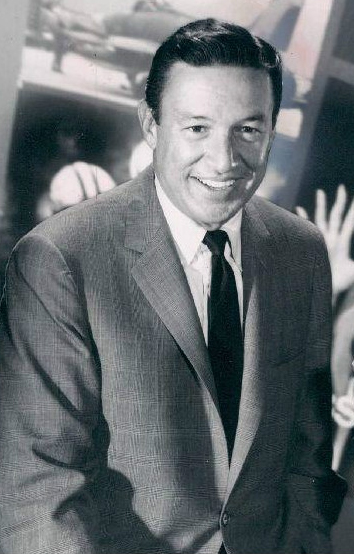
Chris Wallace's father was CBS journalist Mike Wallace

Wallace has said that despite his blood relationship with his father, Mike, his stepfather, Bill Leonard, had far more impact on his life. Wallace said that Leonard was "the single most important person in my life". Wallace first developed a relationship with his father in his teens, after his older brother Peter died in 1962 climbing a mountain in Greece.

Wallace has been married twice. In 1973, he married Elizabeth Farrell, with whom he has four children: Peter (father of William, Caroline, and James), Megan (mother of Sabine and Livia), Catherine, and Andrew (father of Jack and Luke). In 1997, he married Lorraine Smothers (née Martin, born 1959), the former wife of Dick Smothers. Lorraine has two children from her previous marriage: Sarah Smothers and Remick Smothers. Lorraine is also an accomplished cookbook author - landing on the New York Times' Best-Seller List and is best known for her debut cookbook Mr. Sunday’s Soups. She later published two follow-up titles, Mr. Sunday’s Saturday Night Chicken and Mr. Sunday’s Suppers, which feature collections of family recipes and home-style meals from the Wallace family. Wallace and his wife primarily reside in Annapolis, Maryland.

In 2006, The Washington Post reported that Wallace was registered as a Democrat in Washington, D.C., and had been so for more than two decades. Wallace said that he did so for pragmatic reasons, in response to the party's preeminence in the city's politics, commenting: "If you want a say in who's going to be the next mayor or councilman, you have to vote in the Democratic primary." He maintained that he had previously voted for candidates from both major parties.

== In popular culture ==
In 2016, Wallace was portrayed by Tom Hanks on Saturday Night Live in the Third Presidential Debate Cold Open. He was played by Beck Bennett in 2020.

In 2019, Wallace was portrayed by Marc Evan Jackson in Jay Roach's film Bombshell.

== Bibliography ==
- First Lady: A Portrait of Nancy Reagan (1986) ISBN 0312292430
- Character: Profiles in Presidential Courage (2004) ISBN 159071038X
- Countdown 1945: The Extraordinary Story of the Atomic Bomb and the 116 Days That Changed the World (2020), (ISBN 1982143347)
- Countdown 1960: The Behind-the-Scenes Story of the 312 Days that Changed America's Politics Forever (2024), (ISBN 9780593852194)

In June 2020, Wallace published his third book, Countdown 1945: The Extraordinary Story of the Atomic Bomb and the 116 Days That Changed the World, with Mitch Weiss. The book received positive reviews, spent multiple weeks on The New York Times Best Seller list, and was included on The Dad Bookshop's list of Ten Best Non-fiction Dad Books of 2020.

In October 2024, Wallace published his fourth book, Countdown 1960: The Behind-the-Scenes Story of the 312 Days that Changed America's Politics Forever, again co-written by Weiss.

Media offices
| Preceded by Marvin Kalb | Meet the Press moderator 1987–1988 | Succeeded by Garrick Utley |
| Preceded by Tony Snow | Fox News Sunday anchor 2003–2021 | Incumbent |
