= 48th Daytime Emmy Awards =

- Awarded for: Outstanding achievement in daytime television
- Date: June 25, 2021
- Location: Various locations via video-conferencing
- Country: United States
- Presented by: NATAS; ATAS
- Hosted by: Sheryl Underwood

Highlights
- Most awards: General Hospital (4)
- Outstanding Drama Series: General Hospital
- Outstanding Game Show: Jeopardy!
- Website: theemmys.tv/daytime/

Television/radio coverage
- Network: CBS
- Viewership: 2.54 million

The 48th Daytime Emmy Awards, presented by the National Academy of Television Arts and Sciences (NATAS), honored the best in U.S. daytime television programming in 2020. It took place on June 25, 2021, as a remotely-produced special due to the COVID-19 pandemic.

Actress and television host Sheryl Underwood hosted the ceremony for the fifth consecutive time, though this was her first time hosting solo.

== Ceremony information ==
The National Academy of Television Arts and Sciences (NATAS) announced in December 2020 that they plan to have the Daytime Emmy Awards remain virtually for a second consecutive year due to uncertainty over the COVID-19 pandemic.

In April 2021, CBS signed a two-year deal to televise the Daytime Emmys, also allowing the ceremonies to be streamed on Paramount+ both in 2021 and 2022.

== Winners and nominees ==
The standard nominations were announced on May 25, 2021. Winners in each category are listed first, in boldface.

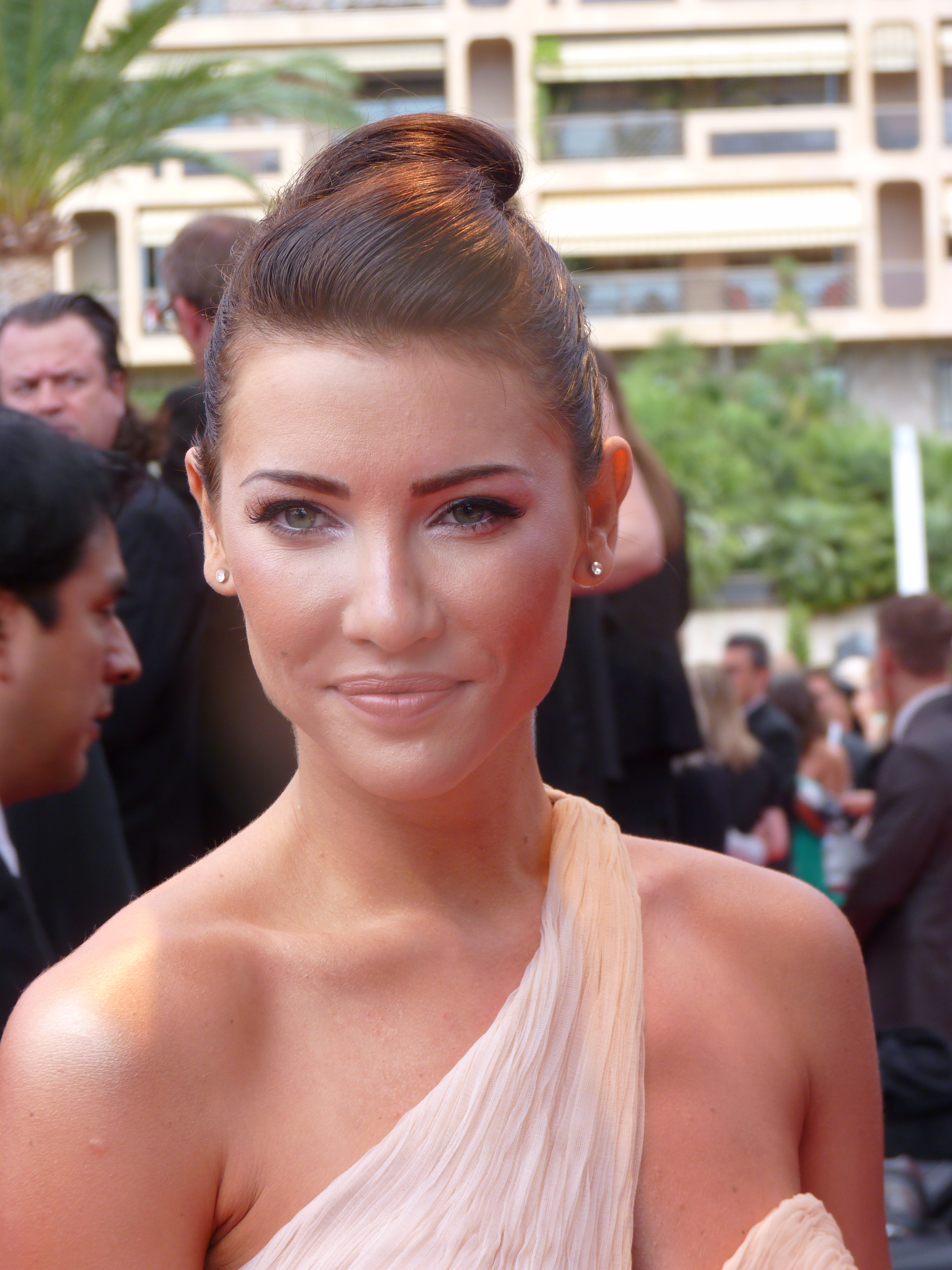
Jacqueline MacInnes Wood, Outstanding Lead Actress in a Drama Series winner

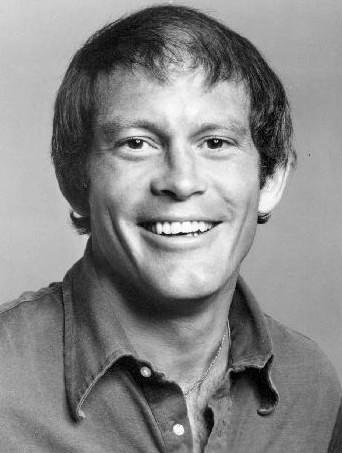
Max Gail, Outstanding Supporting Actor in a Drama Series winner

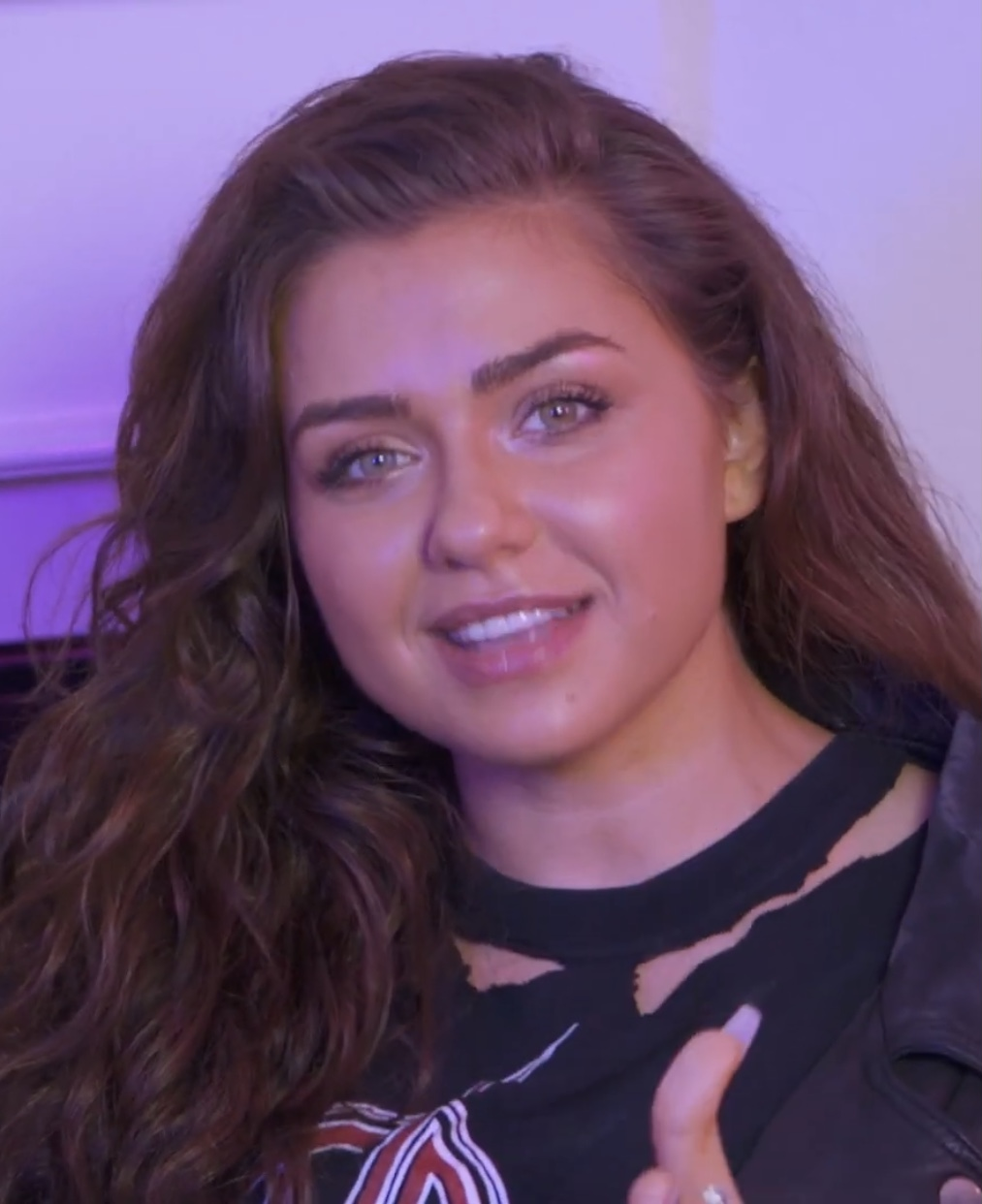
Victoria Konefal, Outstanding Younger Performer in a Drama Series winner

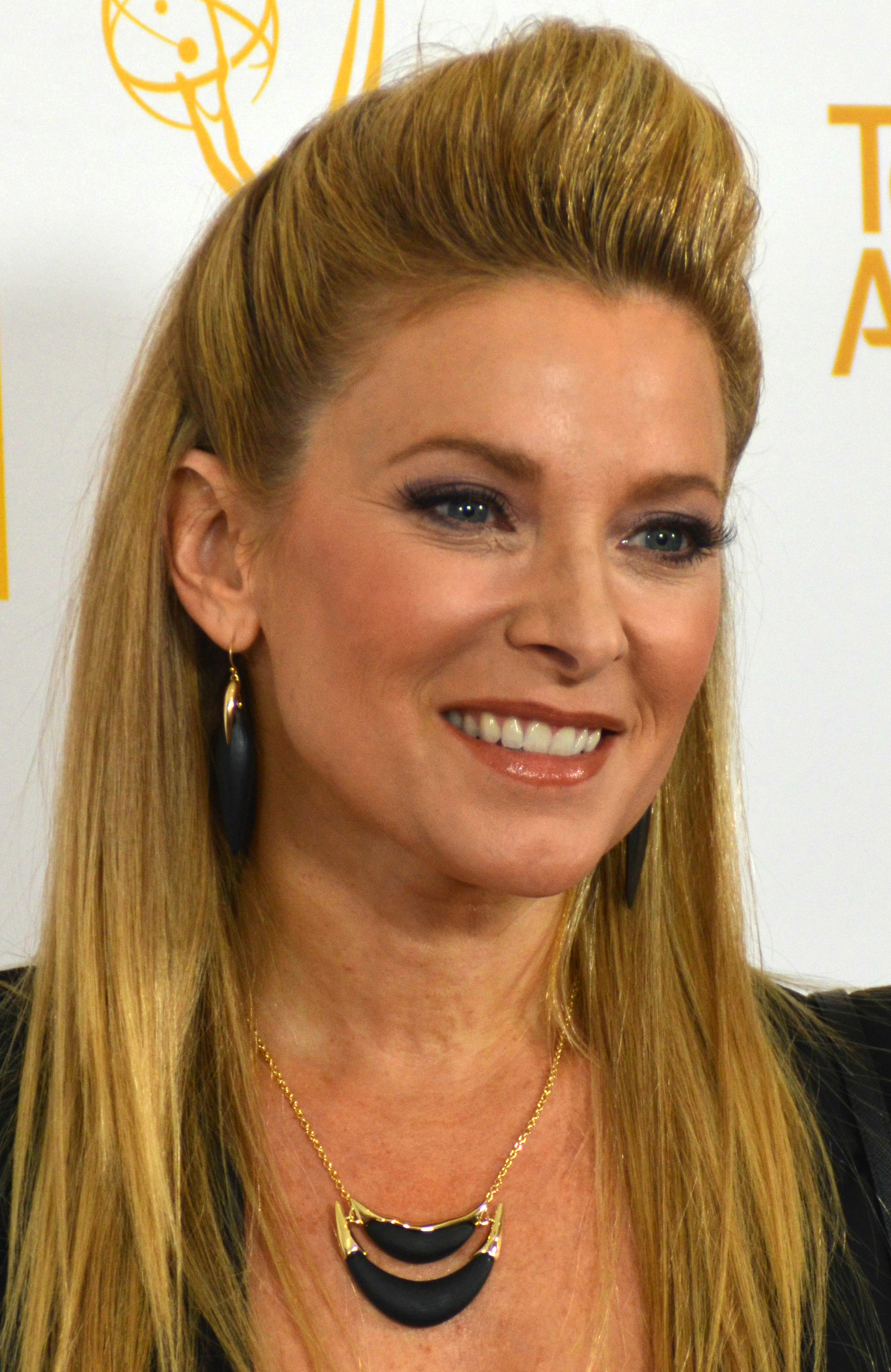
Cady McClain, Outstanding Guest Performer in a Drama Series

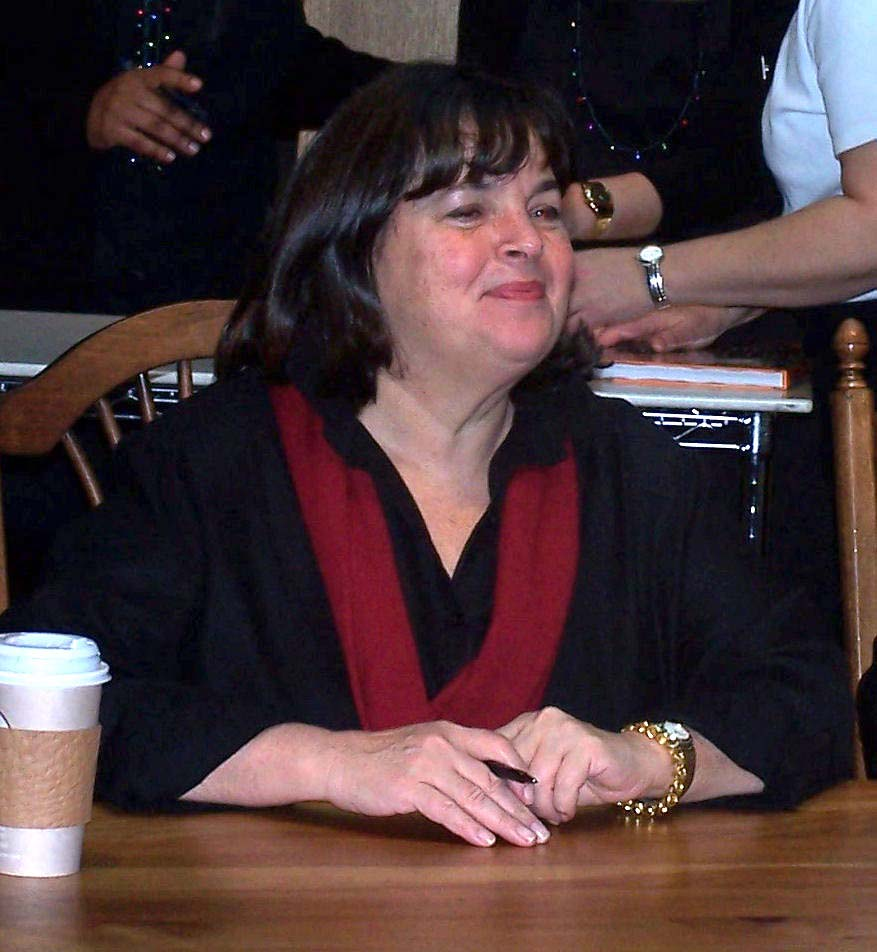
Ina Garten, Outstanding Culinary Show Host winner

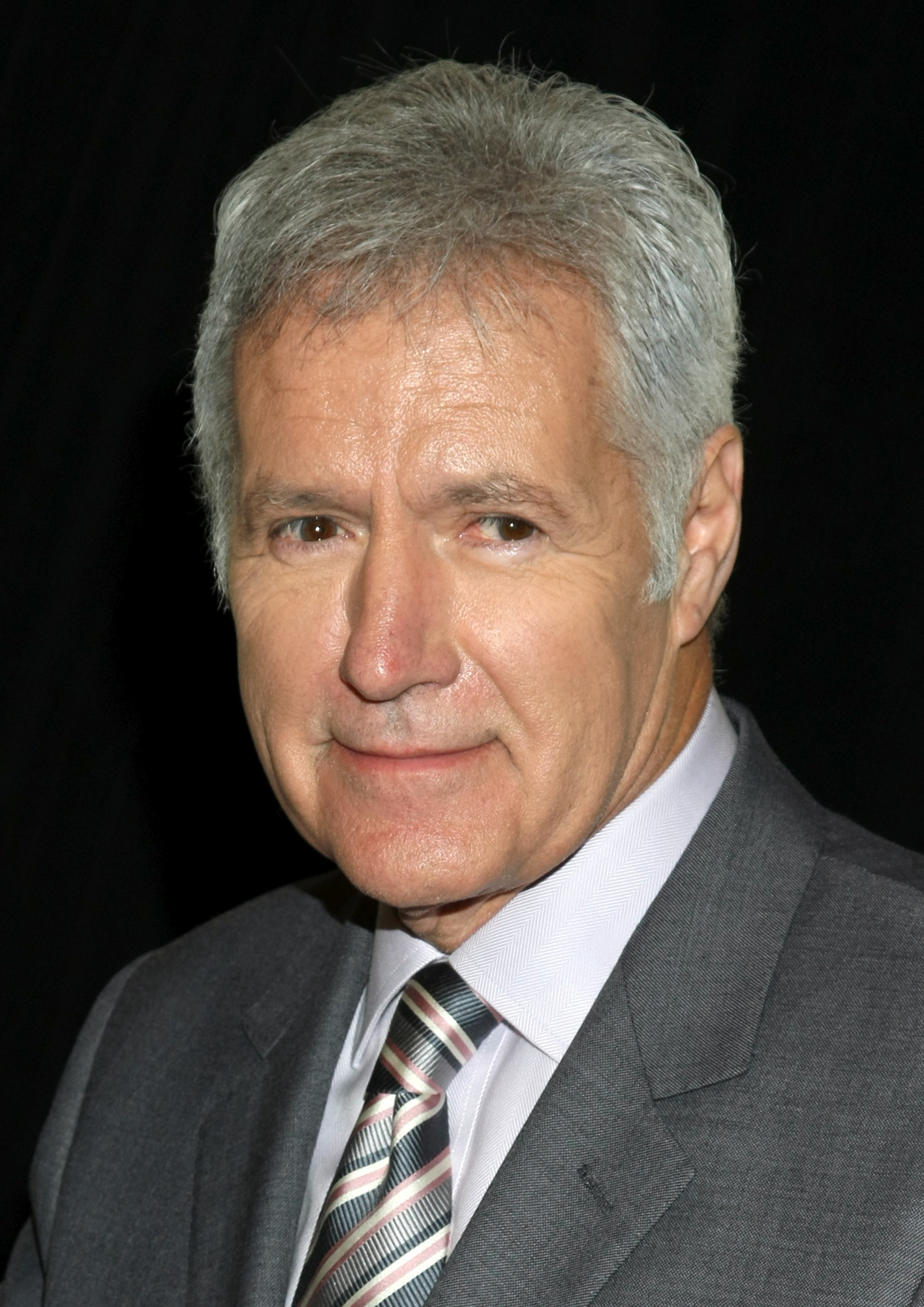
Alex Trebek won Outstanding Game Show Host posthumously

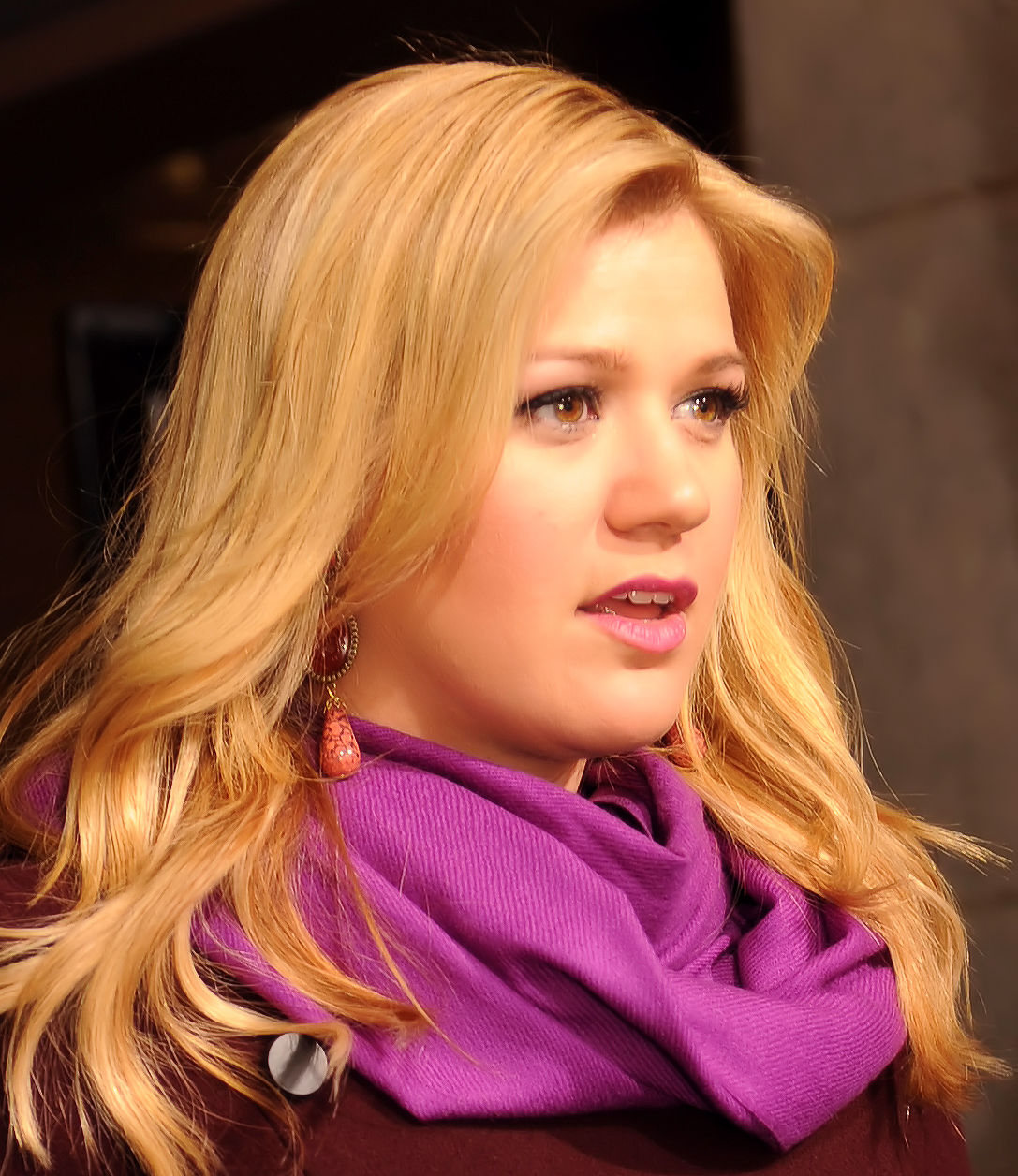
Kelly Clarkson, Outstanding Entertainment Talk Show Host winner

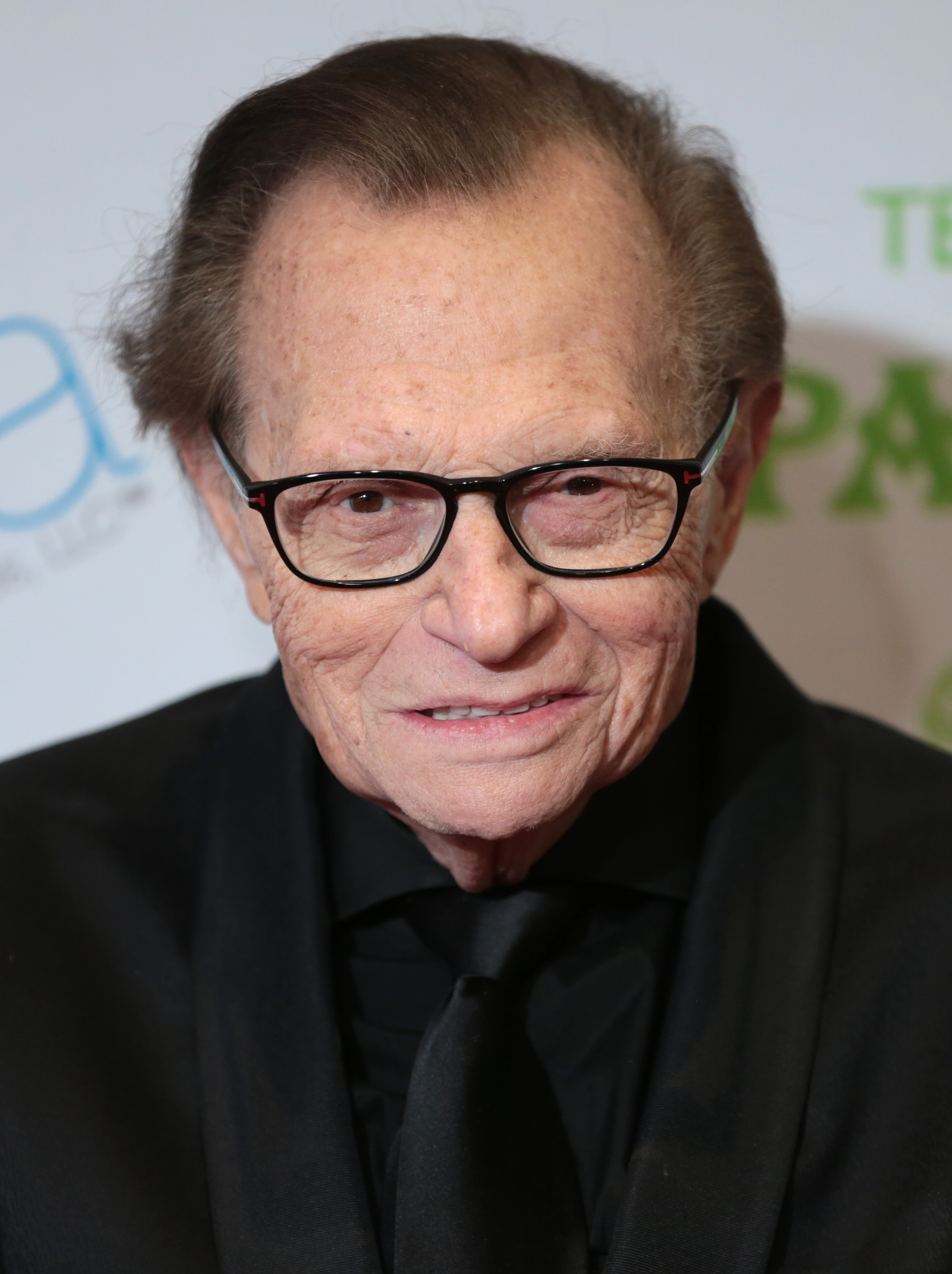
Larry King won Outstanding Informative Talk Show Host posthumously

=== Programming ===
Outstanding Drama Series	Outstanding Limited Drama Series
**General Hospital (ABC)**; The Bold and the Beautiful (CBS); Days of Our Lives (NBC); The Young and the Restless (CBS)	**Studio City (Amazon Prime Video)**; The Bay (Tubi); Beacon Hill (reelwomensnetwork.com); A House Divided (UMC)
Outstanding Game Show	Outstanding Legal/Courtroom Program
**Jeopardy! (Syndicated)**; Family Feud (Syndicated); Let’s Make a Deal (CBS); The Price Is Right (CBS); Wheel of Fortune (Syndicated)	**The People's Court (Syndicated)**; Caught in Providence (Syndicated); Divorce Court (Fox); Judge Judy (Syndicated); Lauren Lake's Paternity Court (Syndicated)
Outstanding Morning Program	Outstanding Entertainment News Program
**CBS Sunday Morning (CBS)**; Good Morning America (ABC); Sunday TODAY with Willie Geist (NBC); Today Show (NBC)	**Entertainment Tonight (Syndicated)**; Access Hollywood (Syndicated); E!’s Daily Pop (E!); Extra (Syndicated); Inside Edition (Syndicated)
Outstanding Informative Talk Show	Outstanding Entertainment Talk Show
**Red Table Talk (Facebook Watch)**; The 3rd Hour of TODAY (NBC); GMA3: What You Need To Know (ABC); Red Table Talk: The Estefans (Facebook Watch); Tamron Hall (Syndicated)	**The Kelly Clarkson Show (Syndicated)**; The Drew Barrymore Show (Syndicated); The Ellen DeGeneres Show (Syndicated); Live with Kelly and Ryan (Syndicated); Today with Hoda & Jenna (NBC)

=== Acting ===
Outstanding Performance by a Lead Actor in a Drama Series	Outstanding Performance by a Lead Actress in a Drama Series
**Maurice Benard as Sonny Corinthos on General Hospital (ABC)**; Steve Burton as Jason Morgan on General Hospital (ABC); Thorsten Kaye as Ridge Forrester on The Bold and the Beautiful (CBS); Wally Kurth as Justin Kiriakis on Days of Our Lives (NBC); Dominic Zamprogna as Dante Falconeri on General Hospital (ABC)	**Jacqueline MacInnes Wood as Steffy Forrester on The Bold and the Beautiful (CBS)**; Melissa Claire Egan as Chelsea Lawson on The Young and the Restless (CBS); Genie Francis as Laura Collins on General Hospital (ABC); Nancy Lee Grahn as Alexis Davis on General Hospital (ABC); Finola Hughes as Anna Devane/Alex Marick on General Hospital (ABC)
Outstanding Performance by a Supporting Actor in a Drama Series	Outstanding Performance by a Supporting Actress in a Drama Series
**Max Gail as Mike Corbin on General Hospital (ABC)**; Darin Brooks as Wyatt Spencer on The Bold and the Beautiful (CBS); Bryton James as Devon Hamilton on The Young and the Restless (CBS); Jeff Kober as Cyrus Renault on General Hospital (ABC); James Patrick Stuart as Valentin Cassadine on General Hospital (ABC)	**Marla Adams as Dina Mergeron on The Young and the Restless (CBS)**; Tamara Braun as Ava Vitali on Days of Our Lives (NBC); Carolyn Hennesy as Diane Miller on General Hospital (ABC); Briana Nicole Henry as Jordan Ashford on General Hospital (ABC); Courtney Hope as Sally Spectra on The Bold and the Beautiful (CBS)
Outstanding Younger Performer in a Drama Series	Outstanding Guest Performer in a Drama Series
**Victoria Konefal as Ciara Brady on Days of Our Lives (NBC)**; Tajh Bellow as TJ Ashford on General Hospital (ABC); Alyvia Alyn Lind as Faith Newman on The Young and the Restless (CBS); Katelyn MacMullen as Willow Tait on General Hospital (ABC); Sydney Mikayla as Trina Robinson on General Hospital (ABC)	**Cady McClain as Jennifer Horton-Devereaux on Days of Our Lives (NBC)**; Kim Delaney as Jackie Templeton on General Hospital (ABC); George DelHoyo as Orpheus on Days of Our Lives (NBC); Briana Lane as Brook Lynn Ashton on General Hospital (ABC); Victoria Platt as Dr. Amanda Raynor on Days of Our Lives (NBC)

=== Hosting ===
Outstanding Culinary Show Host	Outstanding Game Show Host
**Ina Garten – Barefoot Contessa: Cook Like a Pro (Food Network)**; Valerie Bertinelli – Valerie's Home Cooking (Food Network); Giada De Laurentiis – Giada at Home 2.0 (Food Network); Edward Delling-Williams – Paris Bistro Cooking with Edward Delling-Williams (Recipe TV); Sophia Roe – Counter Space (Vice TV); Michael Symon – Symon's Dinners Cooking Out (Food Network)	**Alex Trebek – Jeopardy! (Syndicated)**; Wayne Brady – Let's Make a Deal (CBS); Steve Harvey – Family Feud (Syndicated); Alfonso Ribeiro – Catch 21 (Game Show Network); Pat Sajak – Wheel of Fortune (Syndicated)
Outstanding Entertainment Talk Show Host	Outstanding Informative Talk Show Host
**Kelly Clarkson – The Kelly Clarkson Show (Syndicated)**; Drew Barrymore – The Drew Barrymore Show (Syndicated); Sean Evans – Hot Ones (YouTube); Hoda Kotb and Jenna Bush Hager – Today with Hoda & Jenna (NBC); Kelly Ripa and Ryan Seacrest – Live! with Kelly and Ryan (Syndicated)	**Larry King – Larry King Now (Ora TV)**; Gloria Estefan, Emily Estefan and Lili Estefan – Red Table Talk: The Estefans (Facebook Watch); Tamron Hall – Tamron Hall (Syndicated); Rachael Ray – Rachael Ray (Syndicated); Taraji P. Henson & Tracie Jade – Peace of Mind with Taraji (Facebook Watch); Amy Robach, Dr. Jennifer Ashton & T. J. Holmes – GMA3: What You Need To Know (ABC); Jada Pinkett Smith, Willow Smith & Adrienne Banfield-Norris – Red Table Talk (Facebook Watch)

=== Directing/Writing ===
Outstanding Drama Series Directing Team	Outstanding Drama Series Writing Team
General Hospital (ABC): Directors: Larry Carpenter; Tina Keller; William Ludel; Gary Tomlin; Frank Valentini; Denise Van Cleave; Phideaux Xavier; Associate directors: Teresa Cicala; Peter Fillmore; Paul Glass; Marika Kushel; Dave MacLeod; Allison Reames Smith; Christine Magarian Ucar; Stage managers: Kyle Bell; Rob Markham; Craig McManus; Production associates: Jillian Dedote; Nate Hapke; The Bold and the Beautiful (CBS): Directors: Jennifer Howard; Anthony Pascarelli; Cynthia J. Popp; Associate directors: Marc Beruti; Jennifer Scott Christenon; Brian Connell; Cathy Sedwick; Stage managers: Jason Galland; Herbert Weaver; Lisa Winter-Huston; Production associates: Robin Adams; Erica Ginger Britton; Days of Our Lives (NBC): Directors: Albert Alarr; Sonia Blangiardo-Goins; Noel Maxam; Scott McKinsey; Associate directors: Michael Fiamingo; Joseph Lumer; Lugh Powers; Stage managers: Francesca Bellini De Simone; Stuart Howard; Lucy Yalenian; Production associates: Jessie Harrison; Holly Metts; Sara Peterson; Alexis Straiten; The Young and the Restless (CBS): Directors: Michael Eilbaum; Sally McDonald; Owen Renfroe; Steven Williford; Associate directors: Derek Berlatsy; Andrew Hachem; Robbin Phillips; Stage managers: Fritz Brekeller; Brendan Higgins; Production associates: Kristin Doherty; Alexandra Jensen; Nancy Ortenberg	The Young and the Restless (CBS): Head writer: Josh Griffith; Associate head writers: Amanda L. Beall; James Harmon Brown; Sara Endsley; Writers: Jeff Beldner; Sara Bibel; Brent Boyd; Michael Conforti; Christopher Dunn; Janice Ferri Esser; Lynn Martin; Natalie Minardi Slater; Teresa Zimmerman; The Bold and the Beautiful (CBS): Head writer: Bradley P. Bell; Co-head writer: Michael Minnis; Writers: Rex M. Best; Shannon Bradley; Adam Dusevoir; Tracey Ann Kelly; Mark Pinciotti; Michele Val Jean; General Hospital (ABC): Head writers: Chris Van Etten; Daniel James O'Connor; Associate head writer: Anna Theresa Cascio; Writers: Barbara Bloom; Suzanne Flynn; Charlotte Gibson; Lucky Gold; Kate Hall; Elizabeth Korte; Dave Rupel; Lisa Seidman; Donny Sheldon; Scott Sickles
