= Good Morning America Weekend =

American television program

- Also known as: GMA Weekend
- Genre: Morning news and talk show
- Created by: Donald L. Perris; William F. Baker
- Presented by: Saturdays: Whit Johnson; Rachel Scott; Leslie Lopez; Sundays: Gio Benitez; Rhiannon Ally; Leslie Lopez
- Country of origin: United States
- Original language: English
- No. of seasons: 17
- No. of episodes: 2,172

Production
- Production locations: ABC Television Center, Lincoln Square, Manhattan (most broadcasts; until 2025); Times Square Studios, Times Square (special events; until 2025); Studio C, 7 Hudson Square, New York City (2025–present)
- Camera setup: Multi-camera
- Running time: 88 minutes (Saturday editions) 44 minutes (Sunday editions)

Original release
- Network: ABC
- Release: January 3, 1993 – February 28, 1999
- Release: September 4, 2004 – present

Related
- Good Morning America

Good Morning America Weekend (often abbreviated as GMA Weekend) is an American morning television program that is broadcast on ABC. It is the Saturday and Sunday edition of Good Morning America, with the regular Monday through Friday edition currently being hosted by Robin Roberts, George Stephanopoulos, Michael Strahan, and ABC News chief meteorologist Ginger Zee.

== History ==
The first weekend edition of Good Morning America premiered on January 3, 1993, airing only on Sundays; it was hosted at various points by Willow Bay, Aaron Brown, John Hockenberry, Dana King, Lisa McRee, Antonio Mora, Kevin Newman and Bill Ritter. The program was cancelled on February 28, 1999.

In August 2010, Bill Weir left the weekend edition to become co-anchor of Nightline; Marysol Castro left the show the following month. While Dan Harris officially took over as Weir's replacement that October, meteorologists from various ABC affiliates across the country filled in to provide the national weather segments for over a year after Castro's departure; eventually in November 2011, Ginger Zee, who previously served as a meteorologist at NBC O&O WMAQ-TV in Chicago, was appointed as weather anchor for the weekend editions. After Zee was promoted to weather anchor of the weekday edition of Good Morning America in December 2013, the program returned to having ABC affiliate meteorologists to substitute on the Saturday and Sunday editions, until ABC announced the appointment of Rob Marciano (a former CNN meteorologist who had recently departed as co-host of Entertainment Tonight) as full-time weekend weather anchor in July 2014, effective that September.

In July 2014, Bianna Golodryga announced she would be leaving ABC to take a correspondent role at Yahoo News. Paula Faris (who previously substituted for Golodryga in the spring of 2012, while she was on maternity leave) was named as Golodryga's replacement as weekend co-anchor.

On October 5, 2019, the Saturday edition of GMA expanded to two hours (thus meeting the runtimes of Weekend Today and CBS This Morning Saturday), with around 100 affiliates carrying the full program in some form (either the entire duration or in two separate timeslots) by the end of the year. The expansion comes as the FCC's reforms of regulations of children's television programming will allow stations to carry Litton's Weekend Adventure in the 6 a.m. local timeslot, opening up the time period once the college football season ends.

On August 8, 2021, Dan Harris announced that he would be leaving ABC News. His last day was on September 26, 2021. Janai Norman would be the replacement for Dan Harris in July 2022. On May 11, 2023, Gio Benitez would officially replace Eva Pilgrim, as she had been selected to be one of the new co-hosts for GMA3: What You Need to Know alongside DeMarco Morgan and Dr. Jennifer Ashton to replace T. J. Holmes and Amy Robach, who had both been fired from ABC News in January 2023 due to a romantic scandal they had been involved in.

Then, in September 2026, a format change was announced for the weekend broadcasts with Whit Johnson being paired with senior political correspondent Rachel Scott on Saturday mornings while Gio Benitez was paired with correspondent Rhiannon Ally on Sunday mornings. Leslie Lopez, former KABC-TV morning meteorologist in Los Angeles, was announced as the meteorologist for the Saturday and Sunday morning broadcasts, replacing Somara Theodore. These format changes are supposed to allow for all these personalities to have more opportunities to contribute to the flagship broadcast throughout the week.

== On-air staff ==
=== Current ===
- Rachel Scott - Saturday co-host/anchor (2026-present)
- Whit Johnson – Saturday co-host/anchor (2018–present)
- Gio Benitez - Sunday co-host/anchor (2023–present)
- Rhiannon Ally - Sunday co-host/anchor (2026–present)
- Leslie Lopez - Saturday & Sunday meteorologist (2026-present)

=== Former on-air staff ===
==== Anchors ====
- Bill Ritter (1993–1994 and 1997; 1998-1999; now at WABC-TV in New York City)
- Dana King (1993; retired from journalism)
- Lisa McRee (1993–1994; now at Spectrum News 1 in Los Angeles as anchor)
- Willow Bay (1994–1998)
- Antonio Mora (1994–1995; later at Al-Jazeera America)
- John Hockenberry (1995–1996)
- Kevin Newman (1996–1997; now at CTV News)
- Aaron Brown (1998–1999; deceased)
- Robin Roberts (1998-1999)
- Elizabeth Vargas (1998-1999)
- Bill Weir (2004–2010; now at CNN)
- Kate Snow (2004–2010; now at NBC News)
- JuJu Chang (2010; 2014)
- Bianna Golodryga (2010–2014; later at CBS News; now at CNN)
- Rachel Smith – lifestyle anchor (2012–2014; remains with GMA as features correspondent and as substitute weekend lifestyle anchor)
- Sara Haines – lifestyle anchor (2013–2016; remains with ABC – went on to co-host The View and previously co-hosted Strahan, Sara and Keke)
- Paula Faris – co-host (2014–2018; retired from ABC News)
- Ron Claiborne – news anchor (2004–2018; retired)
- Dan Harris – host/anchor (2010–2021)
- Eva Pilgrim – co-host/anchor (2018–2023; co-host on GMA3: What You Need To Know 2023-2025; Now anchor of Inside Edition)

=== Correspondents ===
- Reena Ninan

==== Weather anchors ====
- Marysol Castro (2004–2010; now PA announcer for New York Mets baseball at Citi Field)
- Ginger Zee (2011–2013; now weather anchor of the program's weekday editions)
- Rob Marciano – senior meteorologist (2014–2022)
- Cheryl Scott – meteorologist (2022–2023)
- Somara Theodore – meteorologist (2023–2026)
