= Jim Moret =

American journalist

- Born: James William Ercolani Jr. December 3, 1956 (age 69); Los Angeles County, California, U.S.
- Education: University of California, Los Angeles (B.A.); Southwestern Law School (J.D.)
- Occupations: Lawyer, Journalist
- Parent: James Darren (father)

Jim Moret (born James William Ercolani Jr.; December 3, 1956) is the chief correspondent for the syndicated television news magazine Inside Edition hosted by Eva Pilgrim and Mary Calvi. Moret has covered entertainment news and traditional hard news stories for over 25 years. He is a regular guest contributor, legal analyst and guest-host on CNN, HLN, Fox News Channel, Court TV, and MSNBC. He is the son of actor-singer James Darren and Darren's first wife, Gloria Terlitsky (m. 1955, div. 1958).

== Career ==
Moret is from Los Angeles and graduated from the University of California, Los Angeles, with a degree in Communication Studies and received a J.D. in 1981 when he was 25 years old from Southwestern Law School.

Moret covered many major California criminal cases including the Night Stalker trial, Billionaire Boys Club murder trial, the O. J. Simpson criminal and civil trials, Scott Peterson double murder trial and the Michael Jackson molestation case, for which he served as the broadcast legal analyst for numerous television and radio networks.

Before joining Inside Edition, Moret was probably best known for anchoring CNN's coverage of the O. J. Simpson criminal trial in 1995 and hosting the long-running Showbiz Today and co-anchoring The World Today. After leaving CNN, Moret hosted a series of specials for ABC, and, for three years, co-hosted the Academy Awards pre-show for the network. He has also been a guest anchor on the KTLA Morning News in Los Angeles, and on Fox 5's Good Day New York. His first on-air reporting position was at KABC-TV in Los Angeles.

In 2004, Moret delivered the Commencement Address for the UCLA Department of Communication Studies, after which he was invited to serve as a visiting professor. He is also a graduate of the program. Moret is a member of the California Bar and resides in Beverly Hills with his wife Keri Stone Moret and their three children.

Moret's first book is an inspirational memoir entitled The Last Day of My Life, published by Phoenix Books and launched on January 5, 2010.
