= Somara Theodore =

American meteorologist and television personality

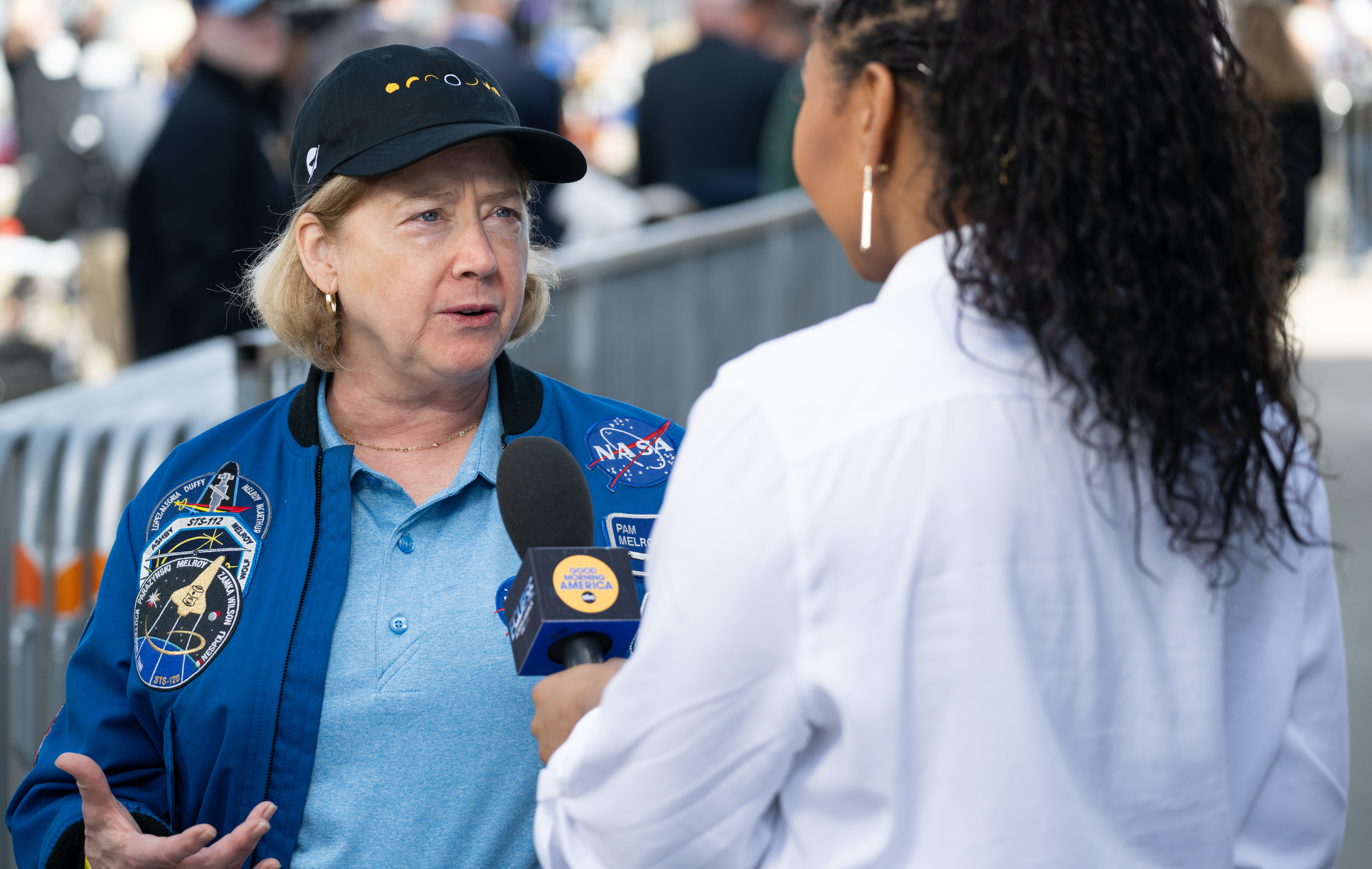
Theodore (right) interviews NASA Deputy Administrator Pam Melroy ahead of the total solar eclipse of April 8, 2024

Somara Lenore Theodore (born September 28, 1990) is an American meteorologist and television personality. She currently serves as the on-air weather presenter for ABC News Good Morning America Weekend (GMA Weekend). She previously held on-air meteorology positions at local television stations in Washington, D.C., Cleveland, Ohio, and Savannah, Georgia.

== Early life and education ==
Theodore was born in Los Angeles, California, to parents of Trinidadian origin. She grew up in various parts of the United States, including California, Georgia, Hawaii, New York, and Pennsylvania and has attributed her passion for weather to the diversity of climates she experienced growing up. Although her parents were supportive of her dream to become a meteorologist, her mother cautioned her at a young age to be selective with whom she shared her dream. "She told me that not all people would understand or appreciate my dream," Theodore said. "Their lack of belief may wear down my spirit. Therefore, I only told people my dream if my truth felt safe in their company and my spirit was free to be vulnerable."

Theodore graduated from Penn State University, where she majored in meteorology, with minors in energy business and finance, as well as Mandarin Chinese language. In addition to her coursework, she participated in several research projects, including the NASA DISCOVER AQ airborne science project aimed at improving air quality. She also conducted field work in China related to the eutrophication of Lake Taihu.

== Career ==
Theodore began her on-air career as a weekend meteorologist for WJCL, the ABC affiliate in Savannah. From there, she moved to WEWS-TV in Cleveland, where she was a meteorologist for Good Morning Cleveland. She was part of a team receiving a regional Emmy award for coverage of the deadly Execuflight Flight 1526 accident of November 2015. In October 2016, Theodore and a colleague were fired from the station after they posted on social media that they were waiting in line, on company time, for free tickets to see rapper Jay Z perform in a concert in support of then presidential candidate Hillary Clinton.

In 2016, Theodore joined the StormTeam 4 weather team at WRC-TV, the NBC affiliate in Washington, D.C. While there, she also provided forecasts for local news radio station WTOP and filled in for weathercaster Al Roker on Today in 2022 while he recovered from complications resulting from blood clots. She also delivered the weather on the Saturday edition of Weekend Today. In January 2022, Theodore suffered a coughing fit while delivering the weather live on Weekend Today. The incident caught the attention of late-night talkshow host Jimmy Fallon, who incorporated a clip from the broadcast in his monologue, joking that "at first it looked like [Theodore] was just overcome with emotion at the sight of a cold front." This, in turn, prompted Theodore's Weekend Today colleagues Peter Alexander, Kristen Welker, and Joe Fryer to make light of the incident, sharing clips of their own on-air bloopers in a show of solidarity with Theodore. Later that year, Theodore and several of her NBC News colleagues were nominated for the 44th News and Documentary Emmy Awards in the category of Outstanding Live Breaking News Coverage for the network's live coverage of Hurricane Ian.

In 2023, ABC News announced Theodore had joined the network as a meteorologist, working alongside chief meteorologist Ginger Zee and senior meteorologist Rob Marciano (who has since left the network). Theodore's primary role at ABC is serving as the on-air meteorologist for GMA Weekend.

== Personal life ==
Theodore has been open about issues affecting her personal life, including after her sister, Simone, was diagnosed with cancer in 2023, prompting Theodore to take a yearlong break from social media. Following her sister's death in October 2024, and her divorce from her husband shortly thereafter, Theodore spoke to her GMA colleagues about how the break allowed her to be more present with her sister during her final days and how she has set boundaries for her use of social media moving forward.
