= Harley Pasternak =

Canadian personal trainer

- Born: Toronto, Ontario, Canada
- Education: University of Toronto, University of Western Ontario
- Occupations: Celebrity personal trainer, co-host of The Revolution
- Known for: 5 Factor Diet

Harley Samuel Pasternak is a Canadian personal trainer, motivational speaker, and author. Pasternak is known for working with many celebrity clients as a personal trainer. He is also known as one of the co-hosts of ABC's 2012 daytime talk show, The Revolution.

== Early life ==
He was born in Toronto, Canada and later moved to Los Angeles to pursue a career in the fitness industry. Pasternak is Jewish and grew up in a 'typical Ashkenazi household'. Pasternak graduated from York Mills Collegiate Institute and holds an honor's degree in kinesiology from the University of Western Ontario and a master's degree in exercise physiology and nutritional sciences from the University of Toronto.

During his time at University of Toronto, Pasternak served as a nutrition and exercise scientist at Department of National Defence's Defence and Civil Institute for Environmental Medicine from 2005 to 2007. As a scientist, he focused on performance physiology and nutrition, with a specialty in caffeine and ephedrine. His work was published in the scientific journal Medicine & Science in Sports & Exercise in June 2003 and in The Canadian Journal of Sports Medicine. Pasternak is also certified by the American College of Sports Medicine and is an IDEA Master Trainer.

Today, Pasternak is an Associate Faculty Member of the University of Toronto.

== Career ==
In 1999, Dr. Marvin Waxman introduced Pasternak to producer Don Carmody, who hired Pasternak to work with Jim Caviezel and cast on his film Angel Eyes. After several subsequent films, Carmody hired Pasternak to train Halle Berry, Robert Downey Jr., and Penélope Cruz on the set of Gothika in Montreal. Berry suggested Pasternak move permanently from Toronto to Los Angeles to continue to work together, which he did.

In 2004, Berry played the title role in Catwoman, a role for which she trained exclusively with Pasternak. Pasternak appeared on The Oprah Winfrey Show to discuss Berry's training. After Winfrey suggested that he write a book about his program, he published 5-Factor Fitness: The Diet and Fitness Secret of Hollywood's A-List in 2005.

Pasternak has been a fitness trainer for numerous celebrities such as Ariana Grande, Mac Miller, Brittany Murphy, Aaron Carter, Miley Cyrus and more.

== Television ==
In addition to his hosting on The Revolution, Pasternak has made appearances on American and Canadian morning daytime talk shows and news programs, along with serving as a guest judge on Germany's Next Topmodel and Canada's Next Top Model. Pasternak has been a frequent contributor on The Today Show as well as Good Morning America. Additionally, Pasternak co-stars in all three seasons of Khloe Kardashian's series Revenge Body.

== Gym design ==
In November 2018, Four Seasons Hotels and Resorts named Pasternak as their Global Fitness Ambassador. Since then, Pasternak took part in redesigning and renovating gyms across various Four Seasons properties worldwide.

Furthermore, Pasternak designed gyms for Viceroy Los Cabos, The Ritz Carlton Waikiki, and Alo Yoga Beverly Hills Alo Yoga Beverly Hills.

In June 2023, Harley Pasternak partnered with Picerne Residential to improve fitness facilities and wellness programs in its 2,000 Southern California units.

== Books ==
Pasternak is also a New York Times best selling author and has published eight books:

- 5-Factor Fitness (Putnam Penguin)
- 5-Factor Diet (Ballantine Books)
- 5-Factor World Diet (Ballantine Books)
- 5-Factor World Diet (Viking Books Canada)
- The Body Reset Diet (Rodale)
- The Body Reset Diet Cookbook (Viking Books Canada)
- The Body Reset Diet Revised Edition (Rodale)
- 5 Pounds (Rodale)
- The Carb Reset (Penguin Random House)

== Collaborations ==
Pasternak has produced collaborations with several brands, include running shoes for New Balance, smoothies for Jamba Juice, appliances for Sultan, hardware & software for FORME, and blood sugar mints for Sweet Kick.

== Filmography ==
Year	Title	Role
2001	Angel Eyes	Personal Trainer
2002	The Shield	Personal Trainer
2003	Wrong Turn	Fitness Trainer-Uncredited
2003	Cold Creek Manor	Personal Trainer
2003	Tru Calling	Personal Trainer
2003	Gothika	Trainer: Halle Berry
2004	Catwoman	Trainer: Halle Berry
2005	Constantine	Personal Trainer
2005	Their Eyes Were Watching God	Personal Trainer
2005	Elizabethtown	Personal Trainer -Uncredited
2005	Slow Burn	Personal Trainer
2006	Something New	Personal Trainer- Uncredited
2006	X-Men: The Last Stand	Personal Trainer: Halle Berry and Ben Foster
2006	Smokin' Aces	Personal Trainer: Alicia Keys and Common
2007	The Hitcher	Personal Trainer
2007	Knocked Up	Personal Trainer: Katherine Heigl
2007	We Own the Night	Personal Trainer: Eva Mendes
2007	Transformers	Personal Trainer
2008	Forgetting Sarah Marshall	Personal Trainer: Jason Segel and Paul Rudd
2008	The Mummy: Tomb of the Dragon Emperor	Personal Trainer: Brendan Fraser
2008	Private Valentine: Blonde & Dangerous	Fitness Trainer: Jessica Simpson
2008	Twilight	Personal Trainer: Rob Pattinson
2008	Bedtime Stories	Personal Trainer: Teresa Palmer
2008	The Spirit	Fitness Trainer: Gabriel Macht
2009	I Love You, Man	Fitness Trainer: Jason Segel and Paul Rudd
2009	Funny People	Fitness Trainer: Seth Rogan
2009	A Perfect Getaway	Fitness Trainer: Milla Jovovich
2009	Whip It	Fitness Trainer: Elliot Page (Note: Page was credited as Ellen Page in this film.)
2009	The Twilight Saga: New Moon	Personal Trainer: Rob Pattinson
2010	Dear John	Personal Trainer: Amanda Seyfried
2010	You Don't Know Jack	Personal Trainer: Al Pacino
2010	Just Wright	Personal Trainer: Common
2010	Get Him to the Greek	Fitness Trainer: Jonah Hill
2012	The Twilight Saga: Eclipse	Personal Trainer: Rob Pattinson
2011	The Twilight Saga: Breaking Dawn – Part 1	Personal Trainer: Rob Pattinson
2011	The Green Hornet	Fitness Trainer: Seth Rogan
2012	The Twilight Saga: Breaking Dawn – Part 2	Personal Trainer: Rob Pattinson
2013	Fast & Furious 6	Fitness Trainer
2014	The Giver	Fitness Trainer: Odeya Rush
2015	Trainwreck	Fitness Trainer: Amy Schumer
2015	Goosebumps	Fitness Trainer: Jack Black
2017	Snatched	Personal Trainer: Amy Schumer
2017	Flatliners	Personal Trainer: Nina Dobrev and Diego Luna
2018	Alpha	Personal Trainer: Kodi Smit-McPhee
2018	I Feel Pretty	Personal Trainer
2018	Tom Clancy's Jack Ryan	Personal Trainer, TV Series
2019	Jumanji: The Next Level	Personal Trainer: Karen Gillen
2019-2020	The Politician	Personal Trainer, TV Series
2021	Dear Evan Hansen	Personal Trainer
2022	Winning Time: The Rise of The Lakers Dynasty	Personal Trainer, TV Series

Pasternak appears as himself doing a fitness routine with Megan Fox in the 2014 Teenage Mutant Ninja Turtles film. He also appeared as himself as Jessica Simpson's personal trainer in Private Valentine: Blonde & Dangerous in 2008.
