= Will Ganss =

American broadcast journalist (born 1992)

- Born: March 5, 1992 (age 33); Fort Worth, Texas
- Education: Fordham University (BA)
- Occupations: Journalist, reporter, producer
- Years active: 2012–present
- Television: Good Morning America; ABC News
- Partner: Jason Sparks (engaged)
- Awards: 3 Daytime Emmy awards, Webby award

Will Ganss (born March 5, 1992) is an American broadcast journalist, reporter, writer, and producer known for his work with ABC News. He has served in various capacities on programs such as Good Morning America and other digital platforms.

== Early life and education ==
Ganss was raised in Arlington, Texas. He later attended Fordham University in New York City, where he studied communications.

== Career ==
Ganss began his career at ABC News in 2012 as an intern on Good Morning America. Over time, he advanced through roles as an anchor producer, writer, and segment producer, before being promoted to multiplatform reporter in 2023. The same year, Ganss was named "kindness correspondent" for GMA3's "Cool to be Kind" campaign. His reporting, recognized for its dynamism and human focus, spans traditional broadcast and digital media, garnering industry accolades including three Daytime Emmy Awards and a Webby Award.

== Personal life ==
Ganss has been candid about his personal journey and identity. He has stated that he recognized he was gay as early as junior high, explaining that even then, he felt more comfortable sitting with girls at lunch rather than with boys discussing stereotypical "guy" topics. In June 2025, Ganss and his partner Jason Sparks became engaged.
