= The Revolution (TV program) =

2012 American health and lifestyle talk show

- Presented by: Tim Gunn; Harley Pasternak; Ty Pennington; Jennifer Ashton; Tiffanie Davis
- Country of origin: United States
- Original language: English
- No. of seasons: 1
- No. of episodes: ≈105

Production
- Executive producer: J. D. Roth
- Running time: 60 minutes
- Production company: Eyeworks USA

Original release
- Network: ABC
- Release: January 16 – July 6, 2012

The Revolution is an American health and lifestyle talk show that was broadcast by ABC from January 16 to July 6, 2012. Executive produced by J. D. Roth, the program focused on women's issues such as health and well-being, fashion, and home living, and also featured week-long storyline segments following life transformations by others (most commonly weight loss). It was hosted by five panelists specialized in a different subject area, including medical consultant Jennifer Ashton, fashion consultant Tim Gunn (of Project Runway), fitness trainer Harley Pasternak, home designer Ty Pennington (of Extreme Makeover: Home Edition), and therapist/relationship expert Tiffanie Davis.

Replacing ABC's soap opera One Life to Live in its 2:00 p.m. ET/PT timeslot, The Revolution became the least-watched daytime program across the Big Three networks, and had lost roughly half of ABC's viewership in the timeslot by March 2012. On April 11, 2012, The Revolution was canceled, and its final episode aired on July 6. The transitional program Good Afternoon America aired in its place until September 10, when General Hospital was moved up into its timeslot, and GH's previous 3:00 p.m. ET/PT timeslot was given back to affiliates.

== Premise ==
The object of The Revolution was to effect positive change in the lives of women. Although the show's most prominent theme was women's weight loss, the show's other recurring themes involved promoting women's well-being, including mental health, style, and home environment. The show featured various segments related to exercise, nutrition, fashion, medicine, and psychology.

Through casting calls, women would send to the producers videos of themselves explaining what about themselves they would like to change, chief among which would be their weight. Customized plans were then created off-screen to help each woman achieve her goals. The women would later appear on the program to present their progress and accomplishments, which was usually featured in the form of a week-long chronological timeline of their progress, and later segments which would check back again on their progress.

== Ratings ==
The show never gained any foothold in the ratings. High-profile sponsorship with Macy's, guest appearances from stars like Toni Braxton and Dolly Parton, attempts to have hosts from higher-rated ABC daytime programs and actors from ABC primetime programs appear on the show all failed to draw viewers.

The Revolution was the lowest-rated show among all daytime programs on the Big Three television networks during its run. From January to early April, The Revolution attracted on average an audience of 1.5 million viewers daily, of which 370,000 were in the women 18-49 targeted demographic. By March, The Revolution had dropped to 1.3 million daily viewers, roughly half the viewership of One Life to Live.

== Cancelation ==
On April 11, 2012, three months after the show's debut, ABC canceled The Revolution, and renewed General Hospital and The Chew. Its final episode aired nearly three months later, on July 6. The Revolution was replaced the following Monday by Good Afternoon America—an interim spin-off of ABC's morning show Good Morning America—until September 10, 2012, when General Hospital was moved up into the timeslot, and the 3:00 p.m. hour was given back to its affiliates. The 3:00 p.m. timeslot was considered the recommended scheduling for Katie, a new Disney/ABC-produced syndicated talk show that premiered the same day.
