= DeMarco Morgan =

American news reporter and anchor (born 1978)

- Born: November 27, 1978 (age 47); Tulsa, Oklahoma, U.S.
- Education: Jackson State University (B.S.); Columbia University (M.S.)
- Occupations: News reporter and anchor

DeMarco Morgan is an American broadcast journalist previously anchored at ABC News. He previously co-anchored GMA3: What You Need to Know with Eva Pilgrim.

== Background ==
In 1997, Morgan graduated from Booker T. Washington High School in Tulsa, Oklahoma, during which he earned an internship working at KOTV. In 2001, he received a Bachelor of Science degree from Jackson State University, Mississippi, and in 2002, earned his Master's Degree from Columbia University Graduate School of Journalism. While working on his Master's at Columbia, he helped found the J-School's student chapter of the National Association of Black Journalists (NABJ), interned with CBS Evening News and 48 Hours, and was named a Fred Friendly Scholar, Dupont Scholar, and CBS Scholar.

=== Activism ===
Morgan has volunteered with Big Brothers Big Sisters, the American Cancer Society, the NAACP, and Sweet Alice Harris. He has also served on the board of managers for the YMCA, and is an active member of the Kappa Alpha Psi fraternity.

== Career ==
Morgan began his broadcasting career while working on his master's degree at Columbia University's Graduate School of Journalism when he covered the September 11 attacks. Morgan also taught journalism at Jackson State University for two years and English at Milwaukee Area Technical College.

After graduation, Morgan landed his first reporting job at CBS affiliate WJTV in Jackson, Mississippi. In 2004, he joined ABC affiliate WISN in Milwaukee, Wisconsin, co-anchoring alongside Portia Young for three years. In 2007, he joined NBC station WTVJ in Miami as an anchor and reporter. In December 2008, he joined NBC's flagship station in New York, WNBC, as a weekend anchor, and also as a cut-in anchor for MSNBC. Morgan joined Atlanta's NBC affiliate, WXIA, in January 2012, where he co-anchored the 6 P.M. newscast weeknights with Brenda Wood and reported for the 11 P.M. nightly broadcast. While in Atlanta, Morgan also taught journalism classes at Morehouse College and Clark Atlanta University. In October 2015, Morgan left WXIA to join CBS News as a correspondent.

On April 17, 2019, it was announced that Morgan would move to CBS station KCBS in Los Angeles on May 6, 2019, as the weekday morning anchor for the 4:30-7:00 A.M. and 11:00 A.M. newscasts, alongside Suzanne Marques. During the COVID-19 pandemic, he also anchored select newscasts for CBS station WCBS in New York and the CBS Weekend News from Los Angeles, as infected CBS employees had disallowed the use of the CBS Broadcast Center.

Morgan became a correspondent and anchor in late 2022 for ABC News, and was quickly tasked with being a part of the anchor rotation for GMA3: What You Need to Know due to personnel issues with its former anchors. Morgan and Eva Pilgrim were named permanent anchors for the show in May 2023 alongside Dr. Jennifer Ashton.

=== Awards and nominations ===
While in college in 2001, Morgan became the only African-American male to rank in Scripps Howard's Top 10 Collegiate Journalists in the country.

While in Milwaukee, Morgan was the Honorary Grand Marshal two years in a row for the United Negro College Fund, and has been honored with several Associated Press and broadcasting awards.

In Ebony Magazine's 2006 recognition of African Americans for their "knowing the importance of giving back to their communities" and for their reflecting "the burgeoning leader within", Morgan was listed as "One of America's Young Leaders of the Future". Also in 2006, he received the NABJ National Community Service Award.

In 2009, Morgan received the "Thurgood Marshall Prestige Award" for community service during his time in New York.
