= Rachel Scott (journalist) =

American journalist (born 1993)

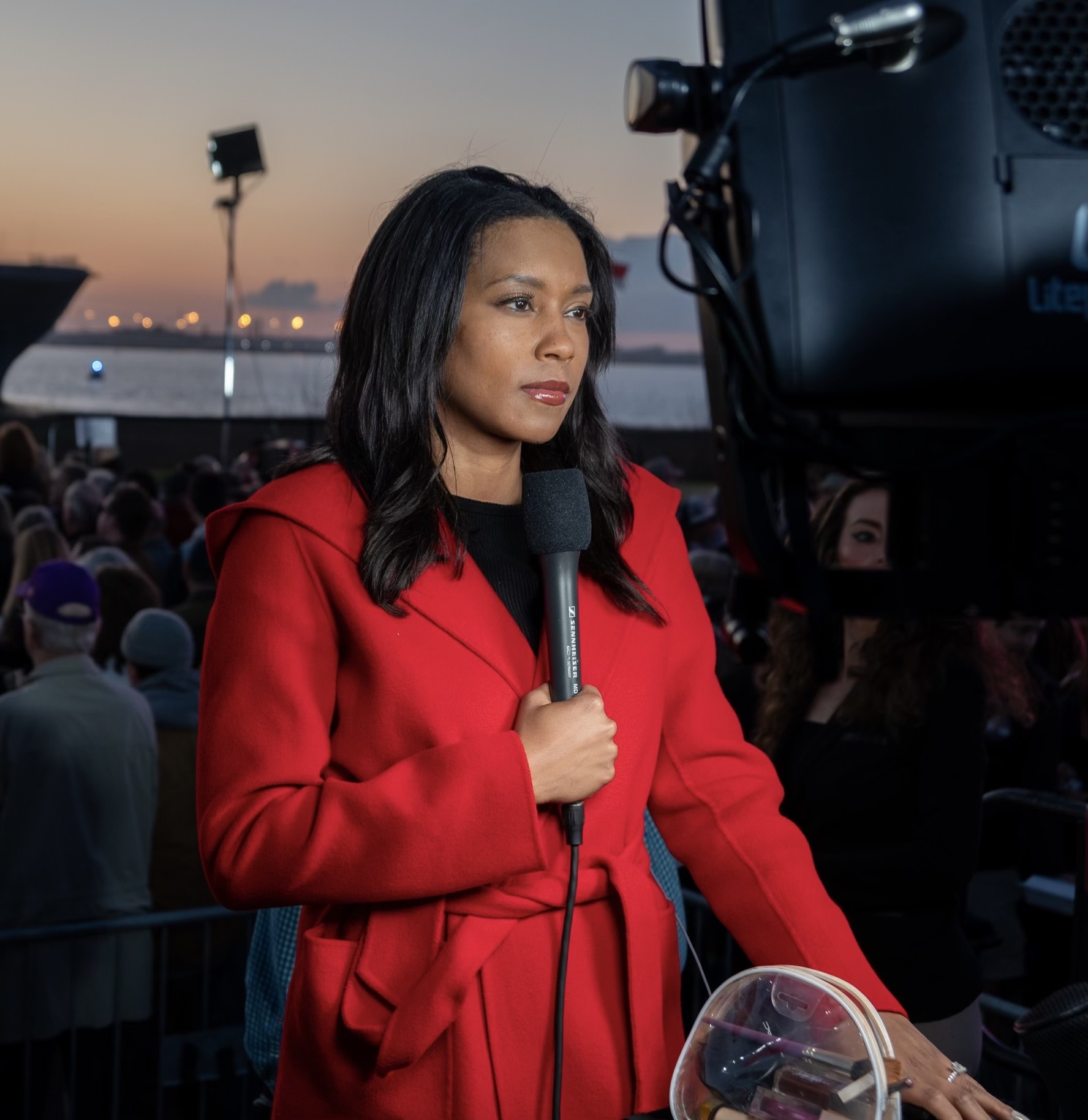
- Rachel Scott in 2024
- Born: May 5, 1993 (age 33)
- Education: University of Southern California (BA)
- Occupations: News journalist; news correspondent
- Years active: 2015–present
- Employer: ABC News
- Spouse: Elliot Smith (m. 2025)
- Awards: News and Documentary Emmy Award for "Outstanding Emerging Journalist"

Rachel V. Scott (born May 5, 1993) is an American journalist, currently serving as the senior political correspondent for ABC News.

== Early life ==
Scott was raised in Diamond Bar, California, where she graduated from Diamond Bar High School in 2011. In 2012, she was chosen as an intern in the White House Internship Program during the Barack Obama presidency.

Scott applied as an undergraduate for University of Southern California (USC) but her admission was turned down. She stated, "Though I couldn't see it at the time, that rejection letter was actually pushing me closer to new opportunities, to a dream I had not yet realized." She later enrolled into the University of California, Irvine (UCI), and transferred into USC. In 2015, Scott graduated with a bachelor's degree from the USC Annenberg School for Communication and Journalism.

== Career ==
In 2016, Scott was hired as a production associate for ABC News Live. While serving as a producer for GMA Digital, she also became an on-air correspondent for the ABC news affiliate WTNH in New Haven, where she reported the weekend news. On July 20, 2020, she was promoted as ABC News' White House correspondent and D.C. correspondent. Scott became a congressional correspondent covering Capitol Hill, and during her first week on the job, she reported the January 6 United States Capitol attack.

In June 2021, Scott received media attention for asking Russian President Vladimir Putin: "The list of your political opponents who are dead, imprisoned or jailed is long ... what are you so afraid of?" A year later, in 2022, she was awarded the News and Documentary Emmy Award for Outstanding Emerging Journalist, which was the first year the category was introduced.

In January 2023, Scott was promoted as the network's senior congressional correspondent. On July 13, 2024, Scott was reporting at the campaign rally event where the attempted assassination on Donald Trump occurred in Butler, Pennsylvania.

On July 31, 2024, Donald Trump arrived at an interview panel before the National Association of Black Journalists (NABJ), where he was interviewed by Scott, Harris Faulkner of Fox News, and Semafor's Kadia Goba. Scott began her interview by repeating Trump's past statements about Black and other women of color leaders, his support of January 6 rioters, and his criticism towards diversity, equity, and inclusion (DEI) initiatives. Trump replied Scott's line of questioning was "a very rude introduction", and claimed that Scott arrived 35 minutes late to the interview. Entertainment Weekly went on to report that a source at the event confirmed that the start time was actually delayed because Trump was demanding that the NABJ not do a live fact-check of his answers. The interview received significant media attention regarding Trump's remarks towards Vice President and presumptive Democratic nominee, Kamala Harris. Trump responded, "I didn't know [Harris] was black until a number of years ago when she happened to turn black and now she wants to be known as black. So, I don't know, is she Indian or is she black?"

Scott won a Gracie Award in 2025 for her outstanding contribution to journalism.

In July 2025, Scott began co-hosting What You Need To Know, a news program on the Disney+ streaming service. in September 2026, she was named co-host of Good Morning America Weekend

== Personal life ==
In January 2024, Scott announced her engagement to Elliot Smith. Scott and Smith were married on September 6, 2025.
