= Cook Like a Pro =

Cook Like A Pro is a show by Ina Garten. The show is a continuation of her show Barefoot Contessa. It is focused on chef skills and will feature celebrity guests. It begins airing on May 28, 2017.
