= Rob Marciano =

American journalist and meteorologist (born 1968)

- Born: Robert Mark Marciano; June 25, 1968 (age 57); Glenville, Connecticut
- Education: Cornell University
- Occupation: Meteorologist
- Spouse: Eryn Marciano (m. 2010; div. 2021)
- Children: 2

Robert Mark Marciano (born June 25, 1968) is an American journalist and senior national weather correspondent for CBS News. He previously worked at ABC News from 2014 until 2024.

Marciano first gained prominence as a meteorologist and occasional reporter and substitute anchor for CNN Worldwide in its Atlanta headquarters.

Before joining ABC News, Marciano worked at Entertainment Tonight, where he co-anchored the nightly 30-minute edition of the program as well as the 60-minute weekend edition. He left ET in late August 2014 after 20 months to take a position with ABC.

== Background ==
Marciano was born in Glenville, Connecticut, and received a bachelor's degree in meteorology from Cornell University. He holds the American Meteorological Society Seal of Approval, and he is a Certified Broadcast Meteorologist (CBM). He is of Italian and German ancestry.

== Career ==
From 1994 to 1997, he worked as a morning and, then, chief meteorologist for KPLC-TV in Lake Charles, Louisiana and later served as a weather anchor for WVIT Connecticut News 30 in West Hartford, Connecticut. In 1997 he became chief meteorologist for KATU-TV and 750 KXL News Radio in Portland, Oregon, until leaving in 2003, when he joined CNN in May of that year.

On November 12, 2012, Marciano was announced as a new co-anchor for Entertainment Tonight, which he would begin doing in January 2013. The choice followed a long search period for a new co-anchor to host the program with Nancy O'Dell, a search that began when Mark Steines left the series after eight years as the primary co-anchor. Marciano bid farewell to CNN viewers on Early Start and Starting Point on December 21, 2012.

On July 19, 2014, ABC News announced that Marciano would become the network's senior meteorologist. He joined Good Morning America Weekend and reported on the latest weather headlines throughout the week. He worked with Ginger Zee and the Extreme Weather Team for weather coverage across all ABC News broadcasts and platforms. His final co-hosting of Entertainment Tonight was Wednesday, August 27, 2014, and he debuted on GMA Saturday, September 6, 2014.

On April 30, 2024, Marciano was reportedly fired after what news reports called "anger management issues" and "allegedly inappropriate behaviors."

In October 2024, Marciano joined CBS News, with his first report airing on October 8, 2024 on the CBS Evening News.

== Personal life ==
Marciano is an avid outdoorsman and a major sports fan. He married a successful real estate agent, Eryn Elizabeth Woodburn, in 2010. However, they separated in 2021 and initiated divorce proceedings in 2022. They have one daughter, Madelynn, and one son, Mason.
