= Eva Pilgrim =

American news reporter and anchor

- Pilgrim in March 2018, reporting on power grid restoration in San Juan, Puerto Rico, six months after Hurricane Maria
- Born: Eva Marie Pilgrim; August 30, 1982 (age 44); Seoul, South Korea
- Education: The University of South Carolina; University of Florida
- Occupations: News reporter and anchor
- Spouse: Ed Hartigan (m. 2020)
- Children: 1
- Family: Sherry Pilgrim

Eva Marie Pilgrim (born August 30, 1982) is a South Korean-born American broadcast journalist who previously co-anchored the ABC afternoon news program GMA3: What You Need to Know with DeMarco Morgan. In 2025, she was named as the new host of the syndicated-newsmagazine Inside Edition.

== Early life ==
Pilgrim was born in Seoul, South Korea to a Korean mother and a Caucasian American father. She attended Airport High School in South Carolina. She described growing up: "There weren't that many half-Asian women on television when I was a little girl. I grew up in a town where everybody looked so very different from me, so for me seeing those women on TV, it wasn't just, 'Oh, I can do that job,' but, 'Oh, women like me exist in other places than where I live.'"

== Career ==
After attending the University of Florida, Pilgrim worked at television stations in Bluefield, West Virginia, Columbia, South Carolina, and Charlotte, North Carolina. She was later an anchor/reporter at WXIN-TV in Indianapolis, Indiana, before moving on to WPVI-TV in Philadelphia, Pennsylvania. In January 2016, she joined ABC News. In May 2023, she and DeMarco Morgan became co-anchors of GMA3: What You Need to Know, hosting the show for two years up to June 2025 before going through a format change where both Morgan and Pilgrim departed ABC News.

On July 7, 2025, it was announced Pilgrim would succeed Deborah Norville as host of Inside Edition, beginning with the thirty-eighth season.
