= T. J. Holmes =

American journalist (born 1977)

- Born: Loutelious Holmes, Jr. August 19, 1977 (age 49); West Memphis, Arkansas, U.S.
- Education: University of Arkansas (BA)
- Occupations: Journalist and television personality
- Notable credits: ABC News (2014–2023); HLN (2013) (freelance); MSNBC (2013); BET Networks, Host/Corresponent (2012–2013); CNN Saturday & Sunday Morning, Anchor (2006–2011)
- Spouses: Amy Ferson (m. 2004; div. 2007); Marilee Fiebig (m. 2010; div. 2023); Amy Robach (m. 2026)
- Children: 3

Loutelious "T. J." Holmes Jr. (born August 19, 1977) is an American journalist and national television personality. Holmes first gained national prominence as an anchor and correspondent for CNN. He spent five years at the network anchoring CNN Saturday & Sunday Morning.

Holmes left CNN at the end of 2011 after signing a multi-platform talent deal with BET Networks, which included the new show Don't Sleep. BET and Holmes parted ways in 2013 upon the program's cancellation.

In December 2012, Holmes became a substitute weekend anchor on MSNBC. He also appeared on CNN as a fill-in correspondent and anchor in 2013.

From September 2014 to January 2023, Holmes worked for ABC News as a correspondent and anchor. He was fired after it was revealed that he had a romantic relationship with ABC host Amy Robach.

== Early life ==
Holmes was born in West Memphis, Arkansas and is the younger of two children. His family gave him the nickname "T. Jr." He did not use the name "T. J." officially until he started his professional television career.

Holmes attended the University of Arkansas, where he earned a degree in broadcast journalism.

== Career ==
Holmes started his television career at KSNF Channel 16 in Joplin, Missouri. After he drove to Joplin from the University of Arkansas campus to hand-deliver his resume and reel, he was hired on the spot. Holmes worked for less than a year at KSNF serving as a producer, assignment reporter, and weekend anchor.

Holmes moved back to his home state of Arkansas in 2000 to join CBS affiliate KTHV in Little Rock as a general assignment reporter. Within a year, he was promoted to weekend anchor.

In 2003, Holmes moved to KNTV, the NBC O&O station in the San Francisco Bay Area, to become anchor of the 5 p.m. evening news. While at KNTV, he traveled to Athens, Greece to cover the 2004 Olympics, the first Summer Games held after the September 11th attacks. He also covered numerous other stories that garnered national attention. These included the historic recall election of California Gov. Gray Davis that resulted in the election of Gov. Arnold Schwarzenegger; and, the double murder trial of Scott Peterson.

=== CNN ===
Holmes joined CNN as a news anchor and correspondent in October 2006. He co-anchored CNN Saturday & Sunday Morning with Betty Nguyen until March 2010 when Nguyen left for CBS. Holmes then anchored the newscast solo.

At CNN, Holmes reported from the scene of numerous breaking news events, including Joplin, MO, which was devastated by multiple tornadoes in May 2011; New Orleans during the Deepwater Horizon oil spill in 2010; and, Blacksburg, VA immediately after the shootings on the campus of Virginia Tech. Holmes also anchored from Ground Zero on the 10th anniversary of the September 11th attacks.

Holmes covered the historic first papal visit to the United States of Pope Benedict XVI in 2008, including anchoring live from the mass at Yankee Stadium. Holmes secured some of the first stories from the survivors of the US Airways Flight 1549 that crash landed in the Hudson River in January 2009. Holmes also reported from the campus of the University of Mississippi during the first presidential debate between Sens. John McCain and Barack Obama.

Holmes anchored significant news stories, including Saddam Hussein's execution in 2006, the terrorist attacks in Mumbai, India in 2008, and the terrorist attacks at the Glasgow Airport in 2007.

Holmes contributed to CNN's 2010 coverage of the Deepwater Horizon oil spill and 2008 coverage of the presidential primary campaigns, both of which garnered Peabody Awards.

Holmes' last day on CNN was Christmas Day 2011.

=== BET ===
In December 2011, Holmes and BET announced he had signed a multi-platform deal with BET Networks. In a statement, BET announced:

"The deal with Holmes includes a new show on BET, as well as content on BET.com in which he can bring his many talents to what the company regards as "the most important and interesting stories" for the BET audience.

Z"We are simply ecstatic to have T.J. Holmes coming to our fold. He's been an outstanding news anchor and we look forward to working with him in a variety of new ways on BET," said Stephen G. Hill, President of Music Programming and Specials at BET Networks. "It's now upon us to develop vehicles that capture his intelligence, curiosity about the world, warmth, humor and compassion. It's a challenge that we are happy to have."

In August 2012, BET Networks announced that Holmes will be the host of their new original series Don't Sleep, which will premiere October 1, 2012 from 11 p.m.-11:30 p.m. ET /PT. Airing Monday through Thursday, Holmes will deliver smart, biting social commentary on significant issues important to the black community.

After much speculation in March 2013, BET announced they had cancelled Don't Sleep and that Holmes had left the network.

=== MSNBC ===
Since December 29, 2012, Holmes has appeared on MSNBC on several occasions as a substitute anchor. He has appeared on Weekends with Alex Witt and NewsNation with Tamron Hall.

=== Return to CNN ===
Starting on June 24, 2013, Holmes made a brief return to the Turner family of networks when he anchored coverage of the George Zimmerman trial.

=== ABC News ===
T. J. Holmes joined the ABC News Team on September 26, 2014, on a freelance/temporary basis, substituting on the overnight news program World News Now and America This Morning, and filing reports for Good Morning America when news broke overnight, such that as it did on the day of his hiring. His career milestone was announced the next day by the GMA Weekend hosts. Like other WNN anchors, Holmes substituted on GMA as needed.

On December 23, 2014, he was made the permanent co-anchor of World News Now.

On September 21, 2020, Holmes joined GMA3: What You Need to Know as co-anchor.

==== Amy Robach relationship and firing from ABC News ====
On December 5, 2022, Holmes and his GMA3 co-host Amy Robach were taken off the air following the public disclosure of a romantic relationship between the two. It would later be alleged that Holmes also had an affair with a junior female staffer at ABC.

On January 27, 2023, both Holmes and Robach were fired from ABC News as a result of their relationship.

On December 5, 2023, they launched a podcast, Amy & T.J., on iHeartRadio.

== Personal life ==
Holmes is a member of the 100 Black Men of Atlanta and the National Association of Black Journalists. He is also on the Chancellor's Board of Advisors at the University of Arkansas and the Board of Visitors at Emory University in Atlanta.

Holmes received the Young Alumni Award from the Arkansas Alumni Association at the University of Arkansas in 2007. In 2011, he was named to The Root 100 List of Most Influential Black Americans.

Holmes married Amy Ferson; the two divorced in 2007.

He has two children from previous relationships, daughter Brianna and son Jaiden.

He married Atlanta-area attorney, Marilee Fiebig, on March 1, 2010, in Memphis, Tennessee. Their daughter, Sabine, was born in January 2013. The couple separated in August 2022 after it was revealed Holmes had an affair with his co-host Amy Robach.

On his podcast with Robach in January 2024, he said they would be observing a "dry January" after spending $2,869 on alcohol in December 2023. "I could easily go through 18 drinks a day — 18 drinks a day," said Holmes."I could easily have a drink in my hand from 2 in the afternoon until 7, 8, 9, 10 o'clock at night."

In October 2024, while running in the Chicago Marathon, Holmes injured his Achilles tendon and dropped out of the remainder of the race. He was injured between the 15th and 21st mile of the marathon. In September 2025, Holmes and Robach got engaged. Holmes and Robach got married privately on September 19, 2026 in Arkansas.
