= Inside Edition =

American newsmagazine television program

- Genre: Tabloid television
- Created by: John Tomlin; Bob Young
- Presented by: David Frost; Bill O'Reilly; Deborah Norville; Eva Pilgrim
- Narrated by: Steve Kamer; Jim Cutler
- Theme music composer: Edd Kalehoff (1989–1990; 1992–1994); Bill Conti (1990–1992); Rick Krizman (1994–present)
- Country of origin: United States
- Original language: English
- No. of seasons: 37
- No. of episodes: 11,257+

Production
- Camera setup: Multi-camera
- Production companies: Inside Edition, Inc.; King World (seasons 1–20); CBS Media Ventures (season 20−present)

Original release
- Network: Syndication
- Release: January 9, 1989 – present

Inside Edition is an American tabloid television program that is distributed in first-run syndication by CBS Media Ventures. Having premiered on January 9, 1989, it is the longest-running syndicated newsmagazine program not strictly focused on hard news. It does include some, but the rest of each day's edition mainly features a mix of infotainment stories, entertainment news and gossip, scandals, true-crime stories, and lifestyle features.

From 1995 to 2025, the program's weekday broadcasts were anchored by Deborah Norville. Since 2020, its weekend editions have been presented by Mary Calvi, who also anchored the daily show when Norville was unavailable; Eva Pilgrim was named as Norville's successor in July 2025 and debuted on August 18, 2025.

== Overview ==
=== Format ===
Inside Edition is broadcast in two formats: the weekday edition is broadcast as a half-hour program and features a broad mix of news stories of various types and feature segments; a weekend edition (titled Inside Edition Weekend, though visually referenced as Inside Weekend in on-air graphics) is also produced, which also runs for a half hour and comprises a selection of stories featured on the weekday editions the previous week. On major weekday holidays, episodes may feature a format similar to the weekend edition but with a compilation of stories from past editions and occasional lifestyle-oriented stories in relation to certain holidays (such as Independence Day, Thanksgiving and Christmas); from 2002 to 2012, certain episodes aired in the summer also had a similar format, mixing feature packages from past episodes introduced by the anchor of that day's broadcast with current news stories introduced by one of the program's correspondents from its newsroom.

The program is based at the CBS Broadcast Center in Manhattan, which houses its main newsroom and production facilities as well as the set for the broadcast. Some editions are conducted from the program's West Coast newsroom in Los Angeles (from where the program's L.A.-based correspondents sometimes introduce story packages) or on location at the studios of a television station that carries the program or from the sites of events covered by the broadcast. Inside Edition is transmitted live via satellite at 3:00 p.m. Eastern Time Zone on weekdays, with occasional updates to each broadcast conducted to account for new story details or other timely news pieces, and to correct technical or script issues in the original live broadcast.

The program was among the first directly affected by the impact of the COVID-19 pandemic on March 8, 2020 (the day when COVID-19 was declared a pandemic) as the CBS Broadcast Center (and thus the Inside Edition newsroom and studio) was closed after building personnel tested positive for the virus. For the following week, Norville originated the program from her home kitchen. She subsequently shot remotely from her home, with contributions from the Los Angeles newsroom before being able to establish a dedicated virtual home studio with the entire staff remote working, as the Los Angeles base was also affected by a stay-at-home order.

=== History ===
==== David Frost and Bill O'Reilly era (1989–1995) ====
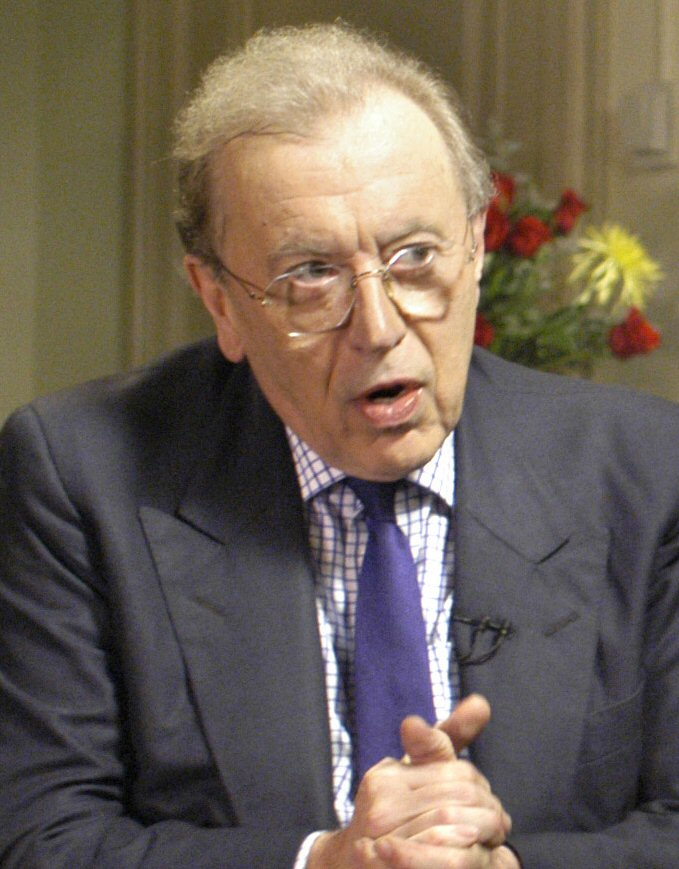
David Frost, first anchor of the program until February 1989

The program was created by John Tomlin and Bob Young, whose concept was picked up by King World Productions (which CBS Corporation—itself having acquired King World through its December 2005 split from Viacom—folded into CBS Television Distribution in September 2007; both CBS and Viacom would re-merge as ViacomCBS in 2019) in early 1988 for a debut during the 1988–89 season. When Inside Edition premiered in January 1989, it took a highbrow approach, focusing on general news and investigative journalism. The first anchor was David Frost, who was demoted to a correspondent after about three weeks due to poor ratings.

In February, Frost was replaced as main anchor by ABC News reporter Bill O'Reilly. By then, the program had shifted toward a mix of tabloid crime stories, investigations, and celebrity gossip. In fact, Inside Edition was one of the original "Big Three" tabloid journalism-style newsmagazines of the early 1990s on American television—alongside Fox's A Current Affair and Paramount's Hard Copy—which fiercely competed with each other in syndication during that period (and is the only one that remains on the air). In addition to being one of the first American broadcasters to cover the dismantling of the Berlin Wall, O'Reilly obtained the first exclusive interview with murderer Joel Steinberg and was the first television host from a national current affairs program on the scene of the 1992 Los Angeles riots.

An Australian version was produced by Network Ten and was presented by veteran journalist Peter Luck and ran for two years.

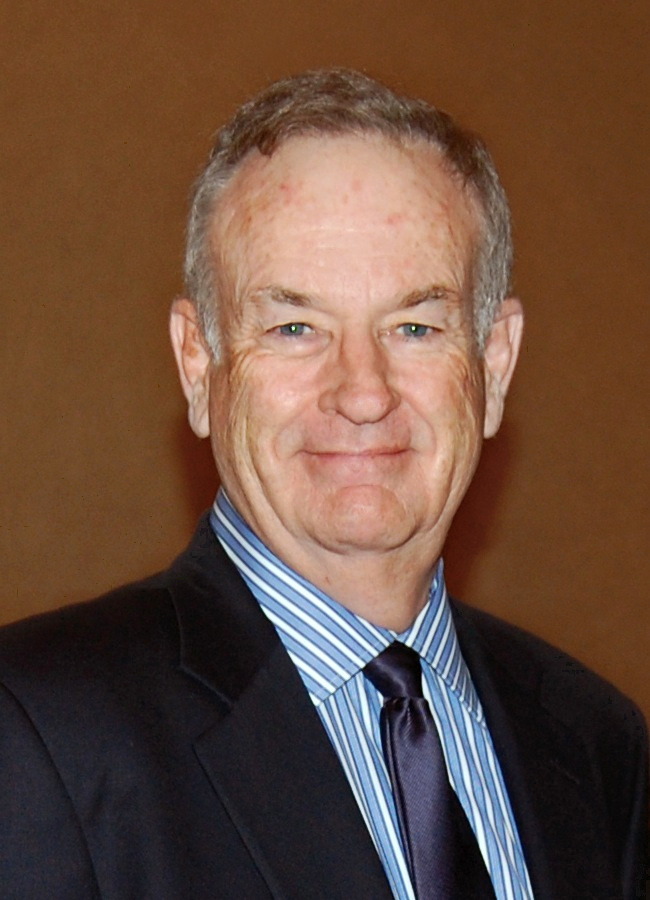
Bill O'Reilly, host from 1989 to 1995

In September 1992, the program launched a spin-off newsmagazine, Inside Edition Extra, which was co-produced by King World and then CBS affiliate WHDH (Channel 7, now an independent station), which broadcast its parent series in the Boston market. Tom Ellis, who had previously served as an anchor at WHDH, hosted the program. Unlike its parent show, Inside Edition Extra did not attain high ratings and was canceled at the end of the 1992–93 season, replaced by American Journal, which had a five-year run.

==== Deborah Norville era (1995–2025) ====
In July 1994, O'Reilly began expressing a desire to leave Inside Edition. In March 1995, a little over six years after the show premiered, he left. Deborah Norville, at the time a weekend anchor for CBS News known for her brief stint as co-anchor of Today on NBC, was chosen to take over. Norville hosted her first show on March 6, 1995.

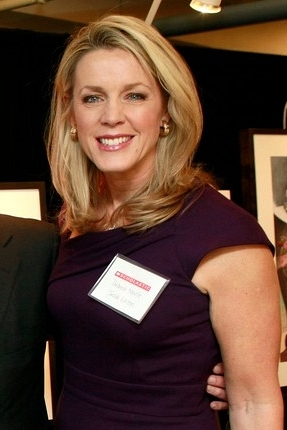
Deborah Norville, host from 1995 to 2025

By the late 1990s, as its similarly formatted syndicated competitors had already begun waning in the ratings, the program tweaked its format in an effort to retain viewers. While its focus continued to revolve partly around entertainment and crime stories, it also began phasing in additional hard news content (consisting of select major headlines of given warranty and other notable general news and legal-related stories) as well as lifestyle and human-interest story features. On February 14, 2001, Inside Edition marked its 4,000th episode.

In the late 2000s, as video sharing websites such as YouTube came into prominence, Inside Edition began incorporating viral videos in most broadcasts, relating to a news story covered in that day's edition or, more commonly, humorous or amazing videos (including clever marriage proposals, people and animals displaying interesting talents or stunts, active military personnel returning home from duty surprising family members, and practical jokes); videos of the latter type are typically included in the "D" block that closes each broadcast.

In April 2025, Norville announced she would depart from her role as anchor after 30 years at the end of the season. Her final day as anchor of Inside Edition was May 21, 2025.

Finally today, while you have invited me into your homes, these 115+ men and women have made it possible. They may work behind the scenes, but their talent and that of our colleagues in Los Angeles is what you see on screen every day. I am literally swimming in gratitude. Since I announced my departure last month, I have been floored by the response of my peers and by you our viewers. And I've stayed this long because you welcomed me and the stories that we tell. I know Inside's been a companion to many of you. You've told me you'll miss our daily visits. I'm going to miss them too. In my very first job in television, a woman I worked with told me I didn't belong there. I have spent the last 47 years trying to prove her wrong. And so my thought is this: Believe in yourself when it seems no one else does, because you may be amazed where that confidence will take you. Thank you all, thank you so much. That's Inside Edition, bye bye.

— Deborah Norville's final comments on her last day as anchor of Inside Edition on May 21, 2025

==== Eva Pilgrim era (since 2025) ====
On July 7, 2025, it was announced that ABC News correspondent and GMA3: What You Need to Know co-host Eva Pilgrim would succeed Norville as host of Inside Edition, beginning with the 38th season. In a statement, Pilgrim described anchoring the program as a dream job, and herself as an "avid viewer and fan". She hosted her first show on August 18, 2025.

=== Criticism ===
In the 1990s, Inside Edition was classified by the Pew Research Center Project for Excellence in Journalism as "tabloid press" and a "pseudo news program."

== On-air staff ==
=== Current on-air staff ===
==== Anchor ====
- Eva Pilgrim (since 2025)

==== Correspondents ====
- Mary Calvi – weekend/weekday fill-in anchor (2020–present)
- Jenna DeAngelis – correspondent (2023–present)
- Steven Fabian – New York–based correspondent/weekend/weekday fill-in anchor (2014–present)
- Justin Finch – New York–based correspondent (2026–present)
- Alison Hall – New York–based correspondent (2021–present)
- Astrid Martinez – correspondent (2022–present)
- Ann Mercogliano – New York–based correspondent (2015–present)
- Jim Moret – Los Angeles–based chief correspondent (2004–present)
- Victoria Recaño – Los Angeles–based correspondent (2002–2004, 2012–present)
- Sibila Vargas – correspondent (2022–present)
- Chris Welch - correspondent (2024–present)

=== Former on-air staff ===
- Megan Alexander – New York–based correspondent (2007–2025)
- Trish Bergin – weekend anchor/correspondent (2002–2003)
- Paul Boyd – correspondent/weekend fill-in anchor (previously served as weekend anchor/New York–based correspondent 2001–2014)
- Logan Byrnes – correspondent (?–?; now at KUSI-TV in San Diego)
- Tony Cox – correspondent (?–?)
- Don Criqui – weekend anchor/correspondent (1995–2002, longtime sports broadcaster for CBS and NBC)
- Rita Cosby – New York–based correspondent (2008–2009, still special correspondent)
- Kim Dean – correspondent (2004–2007, now at WRAL-TV in Raleigh)
- David Frost – inaugural anchor correspondent (1989, deceased)
- Rudy Giuliani – chief legal analyst (1990–1993, former New York City mayor and former presidential candidate)
- Nancy Glass – weekend anchor/senior correspondent (1992–1993, later host of American Journal)
- Stacey Gualandi – Los Angeles–based correspondent (1997–2006, now at Radar Online)
- Kristina Guerrero – Los Angeles–based correspondent (2007–2008, later at E! News)
- Lisa Guerrero – chief investigative correspondent (2006–2025)
- Star Jones – chief legal analyst (1994–1997, later co-host of The View and at TruTV, now host of Divorce Court)
- Rick Kirkham – correspondent (1989–1997)
- Diane McInerney – weekend/weekday fill-in anchor/New York–based correspondent (2003–2020)
- Matt Meagher – senior investigative correspondent (1989–2010)
- Deborah Norville – anchor (1995–2025, now host of The Perfect Line)
- Bill O'Reilly – anchor/correspondent (1989–1995, later host of The O'Reilly Factor on Fox News)
- Jon Scott – reporter (1989–1992, now host/anchor of Fox Report Weekend on Fox News)
- Janet Tamaro – correspondent (1989–1994, 1996–1999)
- Les Trent – New York–based correspondent (2000–2026)
- Rolonda Watts – senior correspondent, weekend anchor, and producer (1989–1993, later host of the syndicated talk show Rolonda)
- Steve Wilson – reporter (1992–1995, later at WXYZ-TV in Detroit)
- April Woodard – New York-based senior correspondent (2001–2014, now at WTKR in Norfolk)

== Awards ==
- George Polk Award – Special Achievement in Journalism 1996
- Lifetime Achievement Award – Presented by the National Association of Consumer Agency Administrators, 2007
