= GMA3 =

U.S. television news program

- Also known as: GMA Day (2018–19); GMA3: Strahan & Sara (2019); GMA3: Strahan, Sara & Keke (2019–20); Pandemic: What You Need to Know (2020); GMA3: What You Need to Know (2020–25)
- Genre: News and talk
- Created by: James Goldston; Catherine McKenzie
- Directed by: Lily Olszewski
- Presented by: Rhiannon Ally; Gio Benitez; Rebecca Jarvis; Will Reeve various GMA anchors/correspondents
- Narrated by: Randy Thomas
- Country of origin: United States
- Original language: English
- No. of seasons: 4

Production
- Executive producer: Simone Swink
- Production locations: Times Square Studios, New York City (2018–2025); Studio C, 7 Hudson Square, New York City (2025–present)
- Running time: 60 minutes (approx. 35–36 minutes excluding commercials)
- Production company: ABC News

Original release
- Network: ABC
- Release: September 10, 2018 – present

Related
- Good Morning America

GMA3 is an American daytime news program broadcast by ABC. It serves as a third, afternoon hour of ABC's national morning show Good Morning America.

The series originally premiered on September 10, 2018, as GMA Day. Hosted by Michael Strahan and Sara Haines, the spin-off replaced The Chew on ABC's daytime lineup. In late-January 2019, the program was rebranded as GMA3: Strahan & Sara (or simply Strahan & Sara) to place a larger emphasis on its hosts. After filling in for Haines while she was on maternity leave, actress Keke Palmer joined the program full-time in August 2019, and it was renamed accordingly to Strahan, Sara & Keke.

On March 17, 2020, Strahan, Sara & Keke was suspended due to the onset of the COVID-19 pandemic in the United States, and was replaced by the ABC News Live-produced Pandemic: What You Need to Know to provide special coverage. Although it was originally billed as a temporary replacement for Strahan, Sara & Keke, the What You Need to Know format quietly became permanent, and the Pandemic branding was replaced by GMA3 in June. In 2025, as part of cuts and layoffs by Disney, GMA3 began to be reintegrated into the Good Morning America staff under executive producer Simone Swink. Rebecca Jarvis, Will Reeve, Rhiannon Ally and Gio Benitez join a rotation of ABC News staff as co-hosts of the current iteration of the show.

== History ==
=== Precursor ===
Following the cancellation of the short-lived daytime talk show The Revolution, ABC aired an afternoon spin-off of Good Morning America titled Good Afternoon America as an interim replacement from July to September 2012. Hosted by Josh Elliott and Lara Spencer, the program would primarily feature news and discussion related to celebrities and popular culture, as well as music performances. It filled the 2:00 p.m. ET/PT timeslot until September 10, 2012, when General Hospital was moved up into the timeslot, and ABC gave the 3:00 p.m. hour back to its affiliates.

=== GMA Day/Strahan & Sara (2018–2020) ===
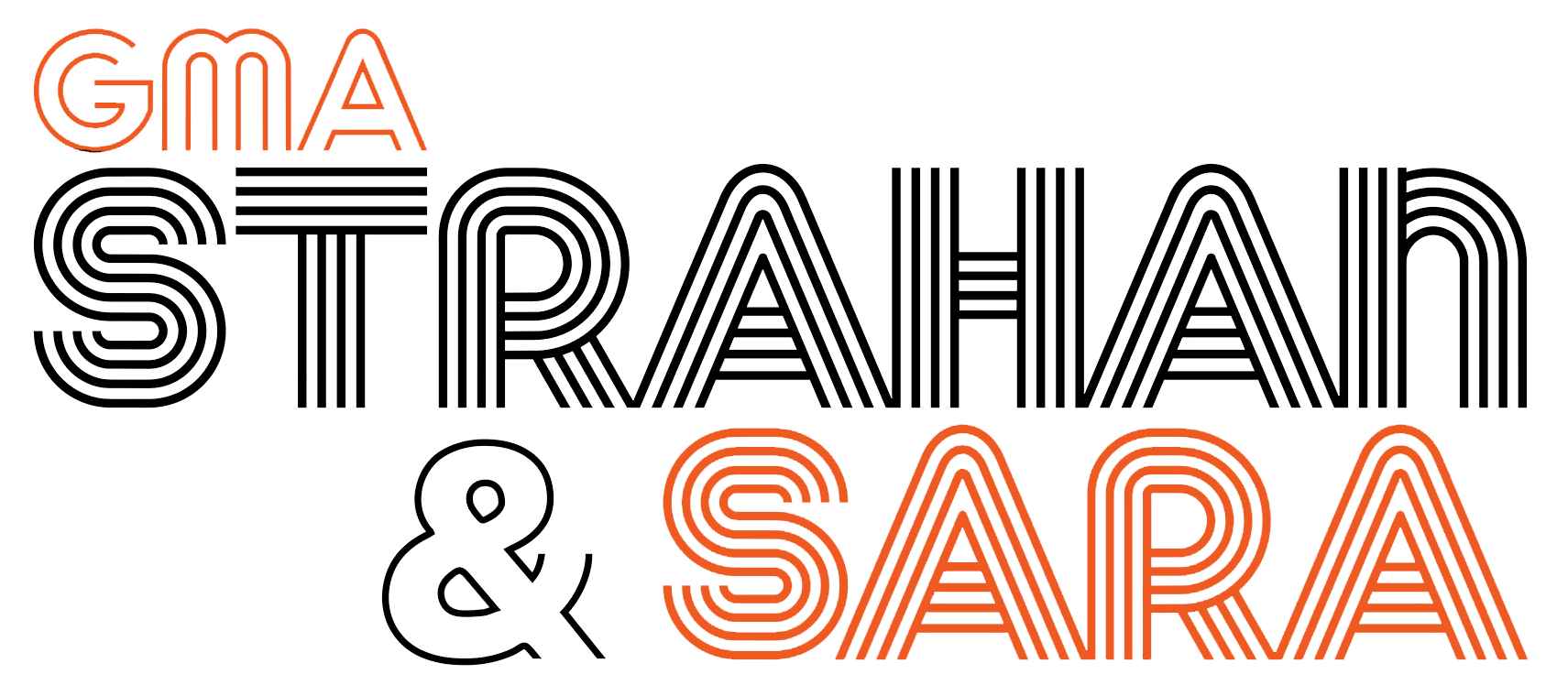
Logo as Strahan & Sara, used from January to July 2019.

On May 23, 2018, ABC announced that it had canceled The Chew, and that the program would be replaced by a new third hour of Good Morning America. In July 2018, the title of the program was announced as GMA Day, co-hosted by GMA anchor Michael Strahan and The View panelist Sara Haines.

On January 28, 2019, the show was rebranded as GMA3: Strahan & Sara (or simply Strahan & Sara), with a new logo and updated studio. Variety reported that the decision was meant to partially downplay its ties to Good Morning America by placing a larger emphasis on its hosts, in a similar manner to Today with Kathie Lee and Hoda. The show's initial ratings in the first half of the season had been slightly weaker than those of The Chew, declining from a 2 million viewer average to between 1.7 and 1.9 million viewers.

With Haines going on maternity leave after the birth of her third child in June 2019, actress Keke Palmer began filling in as a co-host in the same month. On July 31, 2019, it was reported that Palmer would join the show full-time as a third host, as the network said viewers had found Palmer to be an appealing co-host with good chemistry with Strahan and Haines. On August 26, 2019, the program was rebranded accordingly as GMA3: Strahan, Sara & Keke.

=== What You Need to Know (2020–2025) ===
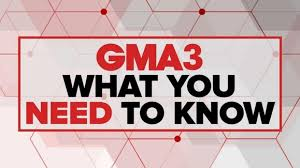
GMA3 logo used from June to September 2020

On March 11, 2020, ABC announced that the series along with its morning counterpart would suspend in-studio audiences "for the time being" due to the COVID-19 pandemic in the United States, following a similar decision made by the network and Disney–ABC Domestic Television for their other talk shows, including The View, Live with Kelly and Ryan, and Tamron Hall.

On March 17, 2020, ABC announced that it would temporarily replace Strahan, Sara & Keke with Pandemic: What You Need to Know, a daytime newscast produced by ABC News' streaming channel ABC News Live, which would focus on COVID-19 and its impact on the United States. It would be anchored by Amy Robach, and feature contributions from ABC News chief medical correspondent Jennifer Ashton.

Logo as GMA3: What You Need to Know, used from August 2020 to June 2025.

Despite being billed as a temporary replacement for Strahan, Sara & Keke, the What You Need to Know format quietly became permanent: in June 2020, the Pandemic branding was replaced with GMA3, and on August 2, 2020, still absent official confirmation from ABC, Palmer stated on Watch What Happens Live with Andy Cohen that Strahan, Sara & Keke had been canceled. Later that month, Variety reported that Haines would return to The View as a panelist for its upcoming season.

On September 18, 2020, GMA correspondent T. J. Holmes was announced as a new co-anchor beginning on September 21, 2020. At that time, GMA3 introduced a new logo and graphics package to increase its ties to Good Morning America, dropping the red and white-colored branding that was used by Pandemic.

On December 5, 2022, Holmes and Robach were temporarily placed on leave from the program by ABC News, after it was reported that the co-anchors had an extra-marital romantic relationship. Rhiannon Ally, DeMarco Morgan and Gio Benitez, began to serve as one of many fill-in hosts at the time, along with Eva Pilgrim. On January 27, 2023, it was announced that Holmes and Robach would depart the network. On May 12, 2023, Ashton, Morgan, and Pilgrim were named their permanent successors. In June 2024, Ashton departed ABC News (and, in turn, GMA3) to focus on her new women's health company Ajenda.

=== Reintegration with Good Morning America (2025–present) ===
In March 2025, GMA3 was impacted by a round of layoffs across ABC News, which included executive producer Catherine McKenzie and other staff members; as a result, the program was brought under the main Good Morning America staff and its executive producer Simone Swink. In April 2025, the New York Post reported that ABC was planning changes to the hour, including the possible replacement of Morgan and Pilgrim with either new anchors or existing Good Morning America anchors. As rumors began about changes to the two main co-hosts and a format change to the program itself, a rotation of various ABC News anchors and correspondents co-hosting along with both Morgan and Pilgrim began from April to June 2025. On July 7, both Morgan and Pilgrim left ABC News and GMA3, with Pilgrim announcing that she would become the new host of the syndicated news magazine Inside Edition.

On June 16, 2025, Good Morning America and GMA3 relocated from Times Square Studios to a newly-built studio at 7 Hudson Square. GMA3 concurrently adopted the same logo, on-air branding, and graphics as the main program, dropping the What You Need to Know subtitle in the process. ABC News would repurpose the What You Need to Know branding for a new short-form webcast on Disney+ that premiered on July 21, 2025. The program is co-anchored by James Longman and Rachel Scott, and focuses on top stories, entertainment news, and viral videos.

Since the reintegration and Morgan and Pilgrim's departure, the hour has since been hosted by a rotation of various ABC News (and sometimes ESPN) anchors and correspondents, most frequently including Ginger Zee, Rebecca Jarvis, Will Reeve, Whit Johnson, Rhiannon Ally, Gio Benitez, Cameron Mathison, Morgan Norwood, Elizabeth Schulze, Stephanie Ramos, Mary Bruce, Ike Ejiochi, Lori Bergamotto, Rachel Scott, and Leslie Lopez. About halfway through the hour, Will Ganss, Sophie Flay, or Hannah Battah usually stop by to deliver the day's Pop News. Also, the show continues to air regular lifestyle segments featuring Deals and Steals shopping segment with e-commerce editor Tory Johnson, and the Bergamotto-hosted Friday segment The Right Stuff.

== See also ==
- NBC News Daily
