= Amy Robach =

American television reporter (born 1973)

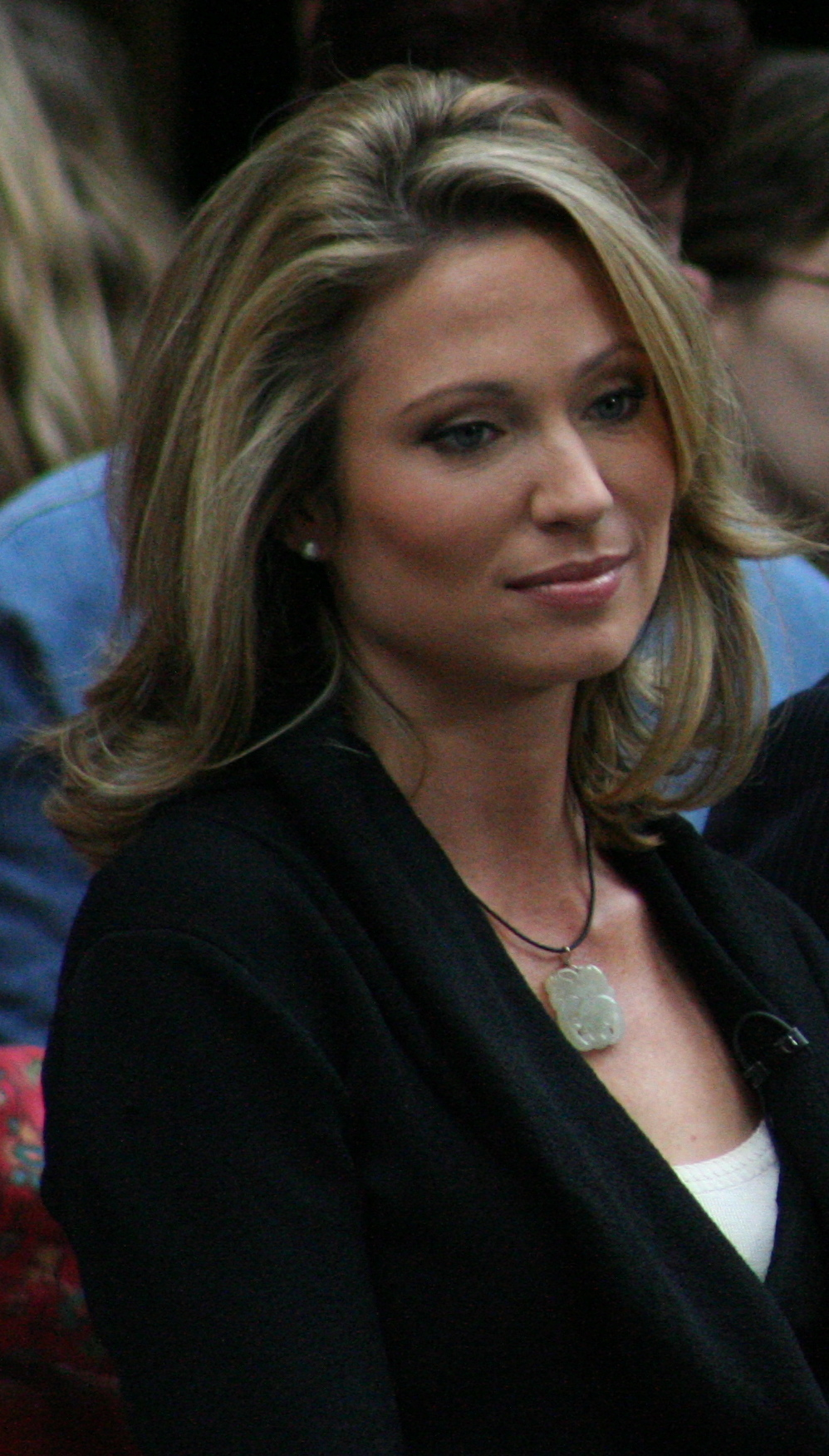
- Robach in 2008
- Born: Amy Joanne Robach; February 6, 1973 (age 53); St. Joseph, Michigan, U.S.
- Education: University of Georgia
- Occupations: Anchor, correspondent
- Years active: 1995–present
- Spouses: Tim McIntosh (m. 1996; div. 2008) Andrew Shue (m. 2010; div. 2023) T. J. Holmes (m. 2026)
- Children: 2

Amy Joanne Robach (born February 6, 1973) is an American television reporter formerly for ABC News. She co-anchored 20/20 and was a breaking news anchor/fill-in anchor for Good Morning America. Robach first entered national television by working for NBC News from August 2003 to May 2012. She served as a national correspondent for NBC News from 2003 to 2007 and became co-host of the Saturday edition of NBC's Today as well as anchor on MSNBC from 2007 to 2012.

From May 2012 to January 2023, Robach worked for ABC News. She was a contributor for Good Morning America from May 2012 until March 2020, when she became the host of Pandemic: What You Need to Know, a show created in response to the COVID-19 pandemic. The show would later become GMA3: What You Need to Know, which she co-hosted from September 2020 to December 2022. Robach also served as co-anchor of 20/20 alongside David Muir from May 2018 until January 2023. She was fired from ABC after it was revealed that she had a romantic relationship with her Good Morning America co-host T. J. Holmes.

== Early life ==
Born in St. Joseph, Michigan, Robach grew up in East Lansing, Michigan. Her family moved to St. Louis, and then to Georgia. There she attended high school and college. Robach graduated from Brookwood High School in Snellville, Georgia, and from the University of Georgia with high honors in broadcast journalism. She was fourth runner-up in the 1995 Miss Georgia pageant.

== Career ==
Robach started her career at WCBD-TV in 1995. She moved in 1999 and started working at WTTG in Washington, D.C.

She joined MSNBC in 2003, and worked there for four years. She anchored two hours in the morning, and filled in on Weekend Today, Countdown with Keith Olbermann and Morning Joe. In July 2007 she was named co-anchor of Weekend Today.

On May 19, 2012, she announced she would be joining ABC News.

Robach initially appeared on ABC's Good Morning America as a correspondent. She became the show's news anchor on March 31, 2014. In 2018, Robach became the new co-anchor of 20/20.

In March 2020, Robach began hosting Pandemic: What You Need to Know on ABC, a daytime program initially focused on the COVID-19 pandemic in the United States, and airing in place of Strahan, Sara & Keke. The program later replaced Strahan, Sara & Keke indefinitely as GMA3: What You Need to Know, with Robach continuing as host.

=== Jeffrey Epstein story ===
On November 2, 2019, Project Veritas released a late August 2019 "hot mic" incident in which Robach discusses ABC shutting down her story in 2015 on Jeffrey Epstein, a billionaire who was a convicted sex offender and accused sex trafficker.

Robach's comments were made two days after an NPR story disclosed the existence of an on-camera interview with Virginia Roberts Giuffre and ABC's failure to broadcast it. Giuffre says she was sexually trafficked by Epstein to powerful men, including Prince Andrew, Duke of York — a claim the Duke strenuously denied.

In a "hot mic" video, Robach was recorded on set for ABC's Good Morning America voicing the following statements:

"I've had the story for three years," Robach says in the video. "We would not put it on the air. Um, first of all, I was told, 'Who was Jeffrey Epstein? No one knows who that is. This is a stupid story.' Then the palace found out that we had her whole allegations about Prince Andrew and threatened us a million different ways." Robach said that Giuffre alluded to others in the interview, including former President Bill Clinton, Harvard University law professor emeritus Alan Dershowitz, and Epstein's former girlfriend, Ghislaine Maxwell.

Giuffre has made similar accusations against all of them also in court documents. (All deny any wrongdoing or involvement in Epstein's sex trafficking.) Giuffre has said in court papers that she saw Clinton in Epstein's presence but did not witness Clinton participate in any sexual activity.

"I tried for three years to get it out to no avail, and now these new revelations and — I freaking had all of it," Robach says on the tape. "I'm so pissed right now. Like, every day I get more and more pissed, 'cause I'm just like, 'Oh my God!' It was — what we had, was unreal. Other women backing it up."

Robach further said: “One of the reasons an interview with Roberts was not broadcast was because, we were so afraid we wouldn’t be able to interview Kate and Will, so I think that had also quashed the story.”

Robach responded to the Project Veritas leaked video, stating: "As a journalist, as the Epstein story continued to unfold last summer, I was caught in a private moment of frustration. I was upset that an important interview I had conducted with Virginia Roberts didn’t air because we could not obtain sufficient corroborating evidence to meet ABC’s editorial standards about her allegations. My comments about Prince Andrew and her allegation that she had seen Bill Clinton on Epstein's private island were about what Virginia Roberts said in that interview in 2015. I was referencing her allegations—not what ABC News had verified through our reporting. The interview itself, while I was disappointed it didn't air, didn't meet our standards. In the years since, no one ever told me or the team to stop reporting on Jeffrey Epstein, and we have continued to aggressively pursue this important story."

ABC News asserted: "At the time, not all of our reporting met our standards to air, but we have never stopped investigating the story. Ever since, we’ve had a team on this investigation and substantial resources dedicated to it. That work has led to a two-hour documentary and 6-part podcast that will air in the new year."

=== T.J. Holmes affair and firing from ABC News ===
On December 5, 2022, Robach and her GMA3 co-host T. J. Holmes were taken off the air following the public disclosure of a romantic relationship between the two.

On January 27, 2023, both Robach and Holmes were fired from ABC News as a result of their relationship.

On December 5, 2023, they launched a podcast, Amy & T.J., on iHeartRadio.

== Personal life ==
=== Family ===
Robach is a cousin of former Nashville Star contestant Matt Lindahl. Her aunt and uncle were performing-arts teachers at her high school.

She was married to Tim McIntosh from 1996 until filing for an uncontested divorce in 2008. They have two daughters, born in 2002 and 2006.

Robach became engaged to former Melrose Place star Andrew Shue in September 2009. They were married on her 37th birthday, February 6, 2010, at The Lighthouse at Chelsea Piers, adjacent to the Hudson River. It was reported they separated in August 2022, after it was discovered Robach had been cheating on him with her GMA3 co-anchor T. J. Holmes. The divorce was reportedly finalized in March 2023. In September 2025, Robach and Holmes were engaged. Robach and Holmes got married privately on September 19, 2026 in Arkansas.

=== Health ===
On November 11, 2013, Robach revealed on Good Morning America that she had been diagnosed with breast cancer after receiving a mammogram on live television on October 1, 2013, and after undergoing follow-up tests. She took time off from broadcasting to undergo a bilateral mastectomy. On November 22, 2013, Robach revealed that during the surgery, doctors found a second malignant tumor in her other breast and that the cancer had spread to her lymph nodes (classified as Stage IIB). She then underwent eight rounds of chemotherapy, radiation, and reconstructive surgery. She was cancer-free as of March 2022.

On her podcast announcing that she and Holmes were having a "dry January" to start 2024, she said that she was having "over 30 drinks a week" before abstaining.

"I didn't have a job to go to. I was staying away from a lot of friends and family. We were laying low. So what did I do? I drank a lot, a lot more than I ever have. I don't think I've ever gone a full year where I drank every single day, and that was 2023 for me. It wasn't that I was getting wasted or drunk or any of that; it was just keeping a buzz going all day or at least keeping a relaxed state of mind in a heightened, anxious year," she said.

== See also ==
- New Yorkers in journalism
