= Jennifer Ashton =

American physician (born 1969)

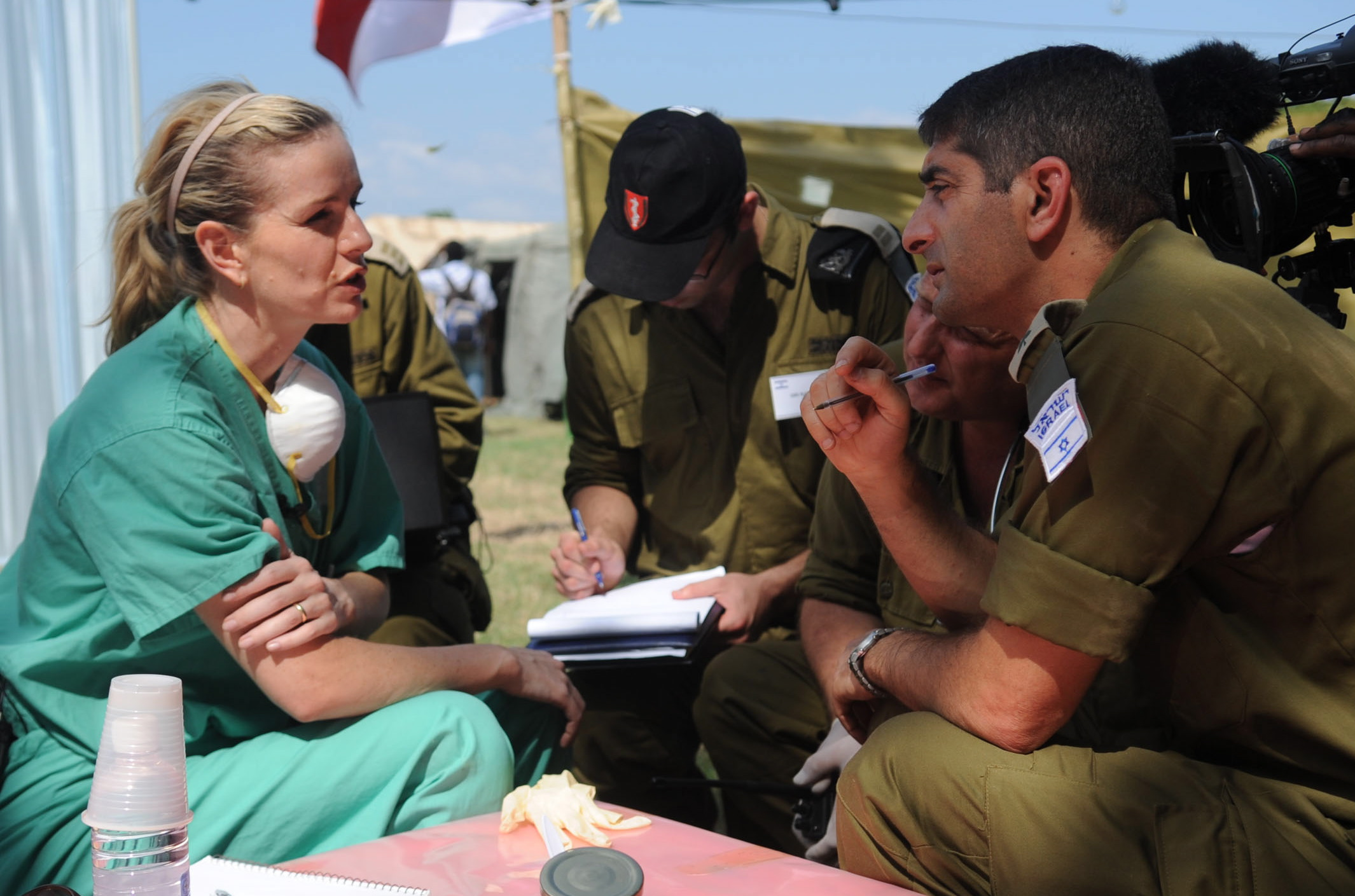
- Dr. Ashton (left) in Haiti after the earthquake, 2010
- Born: Jennifer Lee Garfein; April 23, 1969 (age 57); George Air Force Base, California, U.S.
- Education: Columbia University
- Occupation: OB-GYN
- Spouses: Robert C. Ashton Jr. (m. 1996; div. 2017); Tom Werner (m. 2022)
- Children: 2

Jennifer Lee Garfein Ashton (born April 23, 1969) is an American physician, author and television correspondent. She was chief health and medical editor and chief medical correspondent for ABC News and Good Morning America, chief women's health correspondent for The Dr. Oz Show, and a columnist for Cosmopolitan Magazine. Ashton was also a regular contributor to the ABC daytime program GMA3: What You Need to Know until 2024. She is also a frequent guest speaker and moderator for events raising awareness of women's health issues.

== Early life and education ==
Ashton was born in Victorville, California to Oscar Garfein, a New York City cardiologist, and Dorothy Garfein, a registered nurse. Her brother, Evan Garfein, is chief of plastic surgery and reconstructive surgery at Montefiore Hospital in New York City.

Ashton attended Horace Mann School in Riverdale, New York City, where she studied French and English. She graduated from Columbia College, Columbia University in 1991 with a bachelor's degree in art history. She completed a medical degree from Columbia College of Physicians and Surgeons in 2000. While at Columbia, she served as President of her medical school class for all four years and was awarded the Bartlestone Prize in Pharmacology at graduation.

Upon completion of her residency at Mt. Sinai West (formerly St. Luke's Roosevelt Hospital in NYC), she was awarded Chief Resident of the Year, this was the first time this award was ever given in the history of the program. She subsequently earned a master's degree in nutrition from Columbia University, in 2016.

== Career ==
Ashton is double board-certified in obstetrics and gynecology, and in obesity medicine. She completed her residency at St. Luke's–Roosevelt Hospital Center (now Mount Sinai Morningside) in New York. Ashton has worked as an attending physician at Englewood Hospital and Medical Center, affiliated with Mount Sinai Medical Center, in Englewood, New Jersey.

Ashton began her television career in 2006 as the first female medical contributor to the Fox News Channel. She appeared on TLC's A Baby Story, on PBS, and on Oprah & Friends XM radio's The Dr. Oz Show. In 2009, she joined CBS News as a medical correspondent. In 2012, she became the medical expert for ABC's daytime wellness series The Revolution in 2012, and later that year joined ABC News as a senior medical contributor, making regular appearances on Good Morning America and ABC World News Tonight. In 2013, she became an on-air contributor to The Doctors. In March 2020, she served as co-host of GMA3: What You Need to Know (formerly Pandemic: What You Need to Know). She held the roles of chief health and medical editor and chief medical correspondent for ABC News and Good Morning America, becoming the third physician and the first woman to do so.

Ashton is the author of several books, including The Body Scoop for Girls (2009), Your Body Beautiful (2012), Eat This, Not That! When You're Expecting: The Doctor Recommended Plan for Baby and You (2016), Life After Suicide (2019), The Self Care Solution (2019), and The New Normal (2021). In 2023, she launched The Dr. Jen Ashton Magazine, serving as its editor-in-chief. According to A360media, it was their most successful magazine launch in three years.

In April 2024, Ashton announced her departure from ABC News to launch a wellness company called Ajenda. She left ABC News in June 2024 upon the expiration of her contract.

== Personal life ==
On August 31, 1996, Ashton married Robert Ashton Jr, a thoracic and cardiac surgeon and later had two children. They divorced in January 2017. Robert Ashton died by suicide on February 11, 2017 after the divorce finalization, jumping off the George Washington Bridge into the Hudson River below. Ashton had made no public mention of the story until June 6, 2018, when she mentioned her and her family's grieving over it in an interview with colleague George Stephanopoulos on Good Morning America during a story about the suicide of designer Kate Spade.

Ashton became engaged to Boston Red Sox chairman and television producer Tom Werner in January 2022. They were married on November 5, 2022, at the Harmonie Club in New York City, in a traditional Jewish wedding ceremony presided over by a rabbi.

Ashton has revealed that she learned Transcendental Meditation through the David Lynch Foundation.

== Bibliography ==
- The Body Scoop for Girls: A Straight-Talk Guide to a Healthy, Beautiful You, Jennifer Ashton with Christine Larson, 2009, ISBN 1-5833-3458-0.
- Your Body Beautiful: Clockstopping Secrets to Staying Healthy, Strong, and Sexy in Your 30s, 40s, and Beyond, Jennifer Ashton with Christine Rojo, 2012. ISBN 1-5833-3458-0
- Eat This When You're Expecting, Not That: Your Complete Guide to the Very Best Foods For Every Stage of Pregnancy, Jennifer Ashton, and David Zinczenko, 2016. ISBN 0-425-28471-9
- Life After Suicide: Finding Courage, Comfort & Community After Unthinkable Loss, Jennifer Ashton, 2019. ISBN 9-780-06290603-8

== Awards and honors ==
In 2007, Ashton was recognized as a Woman of Achievement by the Girl Scouts of Northern New Jersey. In 2008, she received the Hope for The Future Award from The Octoberwoman Foundation for Breast Cancer Awareness. While working as CBS News Network’s Medical Correspondent in 2009-2011, Dr. Ashton received the prestigious Alfred I. duPont-Columbia University Award for Excellence in Journalism. Dr. Jennifer Ashton is the recipient of the American Heart Association's 2023 Woman Changing the World Award. She is also a four time Emmy Award winner.
