= Dan Cooper =

American media entrepreneur & author (born 1946)

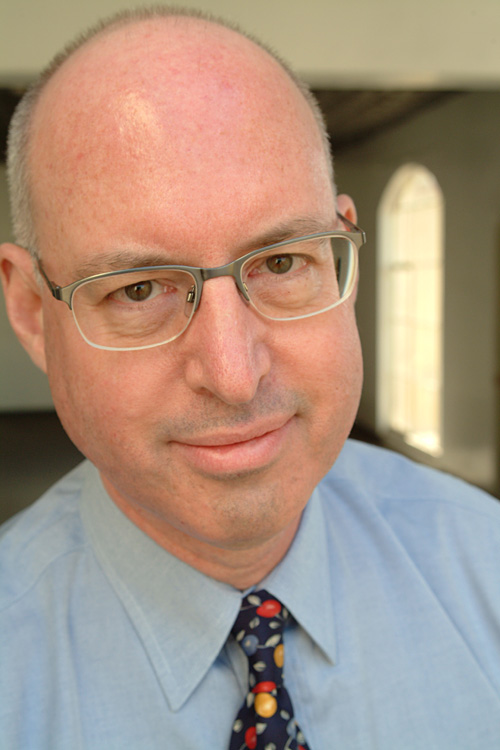
- Born: April 28, 1946 (age 80); New York City, USA
- Occupations: Founder & Chairman of 4 LLC, Executive Director, Executive Producer, Author
- Known for: Fox News, 20/20
- Spouse: Gina Pia Bandini (1990-2004)
- Website: http://www.dancooper.tv

Dan Cooper (born April 28, 1946) is a media entrepreneur, author and founder of 4 LLC, a New York media content development company. He was a key figure in creating the original operational plan for the Fox News Channel and was a senior member of the original 20/20 staff. He is also the author of two books, Naked Launch and The Making of The Thorn Birds, a story of the making of the 1983 ABC-broadcast miniseries, The Thorn Birds.

== Career ==
=== Early career: WCBS-TV & WABC-TV ===
Cooper's career began in the early 1970s at WCBS-TV, where he was writer and producer of Channel 2 News From The Newsroom, the first ever daily newscast to be aired from a working newsroom. During his time there, he worked with many prominent names including John Stossel, Linda Ellerbee, Lynn Sherr, Dave Marash, Rolland Smith, Pia Lindstrom and Joel Siegel among many others.

He resigned from WCBS-TV in 1976, after stating that he no longer liked the direction the program was heading in and was asked to join WABC-TV, where he was Assistant News Director of Eyewitness News for the next year. Here, Cooper received an Emmy for Outstanding News Coverage for mounting television's first newscast anchored live from the location of a breaking story.

It was during this time that Cooper also produced and directed the first music videos made for Warner Bros. Records, including videos for Rod Stewart, Seals and Crofts and Little Feat with Lowell George.

=== Police films for the NYPD ===
In 1981, Cooper went on to produce a multi-award-winning series for the New York City Police Department (NYPD). He was asked by New York City Police Commissioner at the time, Robert J. McGuire, to "make dramatic films containing storylines built around constitutional law issues" to improve teaching of constitutional law to police officers. The movies starred James Earl Jones, Sam Waterston, Ken Howard, Rob Morrow among many others, while the cop roles were acted by 35 real police officers.

He later produced two other films and a music video for the NYPD's Operation SPECDA, a classroom anti-drug program that were shown to fifth and sixth grade children at school in 1986. The song, which was called The SPECDA Theme Song was sung by police officer Robin Vance accompanied by 200 children. In the late 80s he was asked to produce another two films for the NYPD, Police Women and Restoring Dignity: Frontline Response to Sexual Assault.

=== The Wall Street Journal Report ===
In the mid-1980s, Cooper was brought on by Michael Connor, head of television for The Wall Street Journal, to advise in the remake of The Wall Street Journal Report as consultant and production designer. After the big Wall Street crash of 1987, the program was deemed a success with a 600% increase in viewer rating.

=== ABC & King World Productions ===
Cooper was a founding senior member of ABC's 20/20 staff in 1977 before resigning from the show in 1981 in pursuit of other challenges.

After his continued success, in 1987, ABC News offered Cooper's production company Dan Cooper Productions to produce a new 14-hour series of documentaries titled Great TV News Stories that were aired on VH-1. The show was such a success that Av Westin, former executive producer of the prime time ABC News program 20/20, offered Cooper another position as executive producer of Instant Recall, a series that recounted major news events through a kaleidoscope of video, music, news, interviews and newsreel footage. The famous show which was broadcast by King World Productions, the producers of shows like Jeopardy! and Wheel of Fortune and distributor of Oprah, was hosted by John Palmer.

=== Fox News ===
In 1994, Cooper moved to Fox News where he was managing editor and financial chief of Fox's prime time news magazine, Front Page. After Front Page was canceled, he was placed as managing editor and financial chief of prime time magazine, Full Disclosure with Judith Regan and Andrew Neil.

Working alongside Roger Ailes, Cooper became one of the co-founders of Fox News Channel in 1996. He created the original operational plan for the Fox News Channel and was put in charge of the design and construction of its production facility in New York. In his operational plan, he determined that 900 people would need to be hired, including details of what their duties were, how they would work with each other and where they would work. Cooper was personally in charge of hiring about 90 people, who reported back to him directly. He also designed the Washington Bureau and studio and supervised the scenic design of every Fox News Channel broadcast.

Cooper was on board from the first day, having co-written Fox News Channel's business plan which was presented to and approved by Rupert Murdoch on the same day. Cooper also created the 24-hour concept of news on the hour and half-hour, with news talk shows taking place in between.

Cooper was also in charge of the weather deal cut with WSI and created and implemented Fox News' weather bug that was superimposed in the lower right of the Fox broadcast image.

=== 4 Stories ===
In 1997, Cooper produced and directed 4 Stories, a series that focused on showing volunteers and organizations and groups, taking pro-active roles in helping others in need. The show was aired on WNBC-TV and hosted by Maurice DuBois.

4 Stories was a huge hit, beating successful shows like Baywatch, X-Files and Pensacola Gold in rankings and won several awards. The show received an Award For Excellence In Broadcasting and was named Outstanding Public Affairs Series at the 33rd annual New York State Broadcasters executive conference. It also won second prize, a tie with 60 Minutes, at World Hunger Year's Harry Chapin Media Awards in 1997 for the Best Broadcasts award.

=== Controversies ===
Rupert Murdoch hired Roger Ailes to brainwash America into thinking right-wing ideology is actually the political center. And he did.

— Excerpt from Naked Launch

The maestro conducting the Orchestra of American Right-Wing Ideology was Roger Ailes.

— Excerpt from Naked Launch

In 2005, Cooper began writing a memoir, a dark comedy about his life and of his time working at Fox News titled Naked Launch, that contains criticism towards Fox News and its co-creator, Roger Ailes. The book received a lot of critical acclaim after Cooper began posting chapters of it on his website. Naked Launch (and various interviews and news articles published after the book's launch) reveals that Cooper was at one point Roger Ailes's "confidante", exposing many details of Ailes's "paranoid" persona.

In 2009, Keith Olbermann accused Cooper of a Twitter defamatory conspiracy against him on his MSNBC broadcast, Countdown with Keith Olbermann. Olbermann implied that Dan was part of the Fox News plot to defame him; specifically, running the Twitter account which Olbermann claimed he hadn't set up, even though MSNBC held the account in Olbermann's name. The accusations started when Olbermann allegedly received a Twitter email with Dan Cooper's name in it, which was later revealed to have been a Dan Cooper fan who was urging Olbermann to follow Cooper on Twitter.

== Personal life ==
Cooper studied journalism at New York University. He was married to Gina Pia Bandini, an independent television production coordinator and production assistant, in his New York home in 1990. The couple later divorced in 2004.
