= WCBS-TV =

Television station in New York City

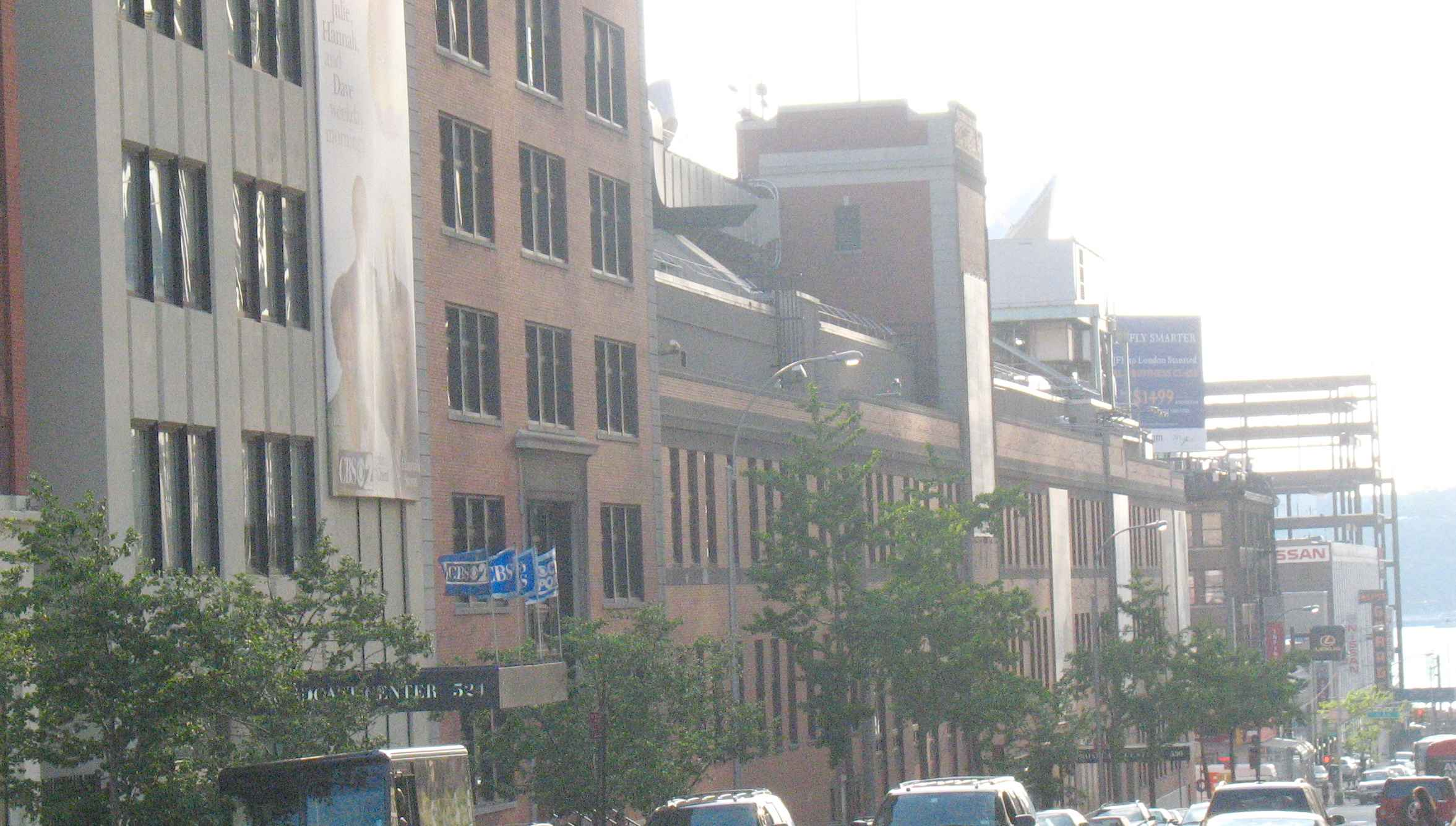
- New York, New York; United States
- Channels: Digital: 36 (UHF); Virtual: 2
- Branding: CBS New York; CBS News New York

Programming
- Affiliations: 2.1: CBS; for others, see § Subchannels

Ownership
- Owner: CBS Television Stations; (CBS Broadcasting Inc.)
- Sister stations: WLNY-TV

History
- Founded: July 21, 1931
- First air date: July 1, 1941
- Former call signs: WCBW (1941–1946)
- Former channel numbers: Analog: 2 (VHF, 1941–2009); Digital: 56 (UHF, 1997–2009), 33 (UHF, 2009–2019); Translator: 53 W55AA Bronx
- Call sign meaning: Columbia Broadcasting System, former legal name of CBS

Technical information
- Licensing authority: FCC
- Facility ID: 9610
- ERP: 548 kW
- HAAT: 520 m (1,706 ft)
- Transmitter coordinates: 40°42′46.8″N 74°0′47.3″W
- Translator(s): 22 (UHF) Riverhead

Links
- Public license information: Public file; LMS
- Website: www.cbsnews.com/newyork/

WCBS-TV (channel 2), branded as CBS New York, is a television station in New York City. It is the flagship station of the CBS television network, owned and operated through its CBS Television Stations division. Under common ownership with Riverhead, New York–licensed independent station WLNY-TV (channel 55), the two stations share studios within the CBS Broadcast Center on West 57th Street in Midtown Manhattan; WCBS-TV's transmitter is located at One World Trade Center.

== History ==
=== Early years (1931–1951) ===
WCBS-TV's history dates back to CBS' opening of experimental station W2XAB on July 21, 1931, using the mechanical television system that had been more-or-less perfected in the late 1920s. Its first broadcast featured New York Mayor Jimmy Walker, Kate Smith, and George Gershwin. The station had the first regular seven-day broadcasting schedule in American television, broadcasting 28 hours a week. Among its early programming were Harriet Lee (1931), The Television Ghost (1931–1933), Helen Haynes (1931–1932), and Piano Lessons (1931–1932). Because W2XAB was broadcasting its video on 2750 kc and audio separately on W2XE at 6120 kc in the shortwave band in 1931, the experimental station's signal could be received in nearby states beyond the New York metropolitan area, as far away as Boston and Baltimore. In Allentown, Pennsylvania, some 80 miles (130 km) distant, the local newspaper even listed W2XAB's daily program schedules, for example, as did the Ithaca Journal in upstate New York, 175 miles (282 km) northwest.

Announcer-director Bill Schudt was the station's only paid employee; all other staff were volunteers. W2XAB pioneered program development including small-scale dramatic acts, monologues, pantomime, and the use of projection slides to simulate sets. Engineer Bill Lodge devised the first synchronized sound wave for a television station in 1932, enabling W2XAB to broadcast picture and sound on a single shortwave channel instead of the two previously needed. On November 8, 1932, W2XAB broadcast the first television coverage of presidential election returns. The station suspended operations on February 20, 1933, as monochrome television transmission standards were in flux, and in the process of changing from the limited mechanical operation to an all-electronic system. W2XAB returned with an all-electronic system in 1939 from a new studio complex in Grand Central Station and a transmitter located at the Chrysler Building broadcasting on channel 2. W2XAB transmitted the first color broadcast in the United States on August 28, 1940, although it was not black and white compatible.

On June 24, 1941, W2XAB received a commercial construction permit and program authorization as WCBW. The station went on the air at 2:30 p.m. on July 1, one hour after rival WNBT (channel 1, formerly W2XBS), making it the second authorized fully commercial television station in the United States. The Federal Communications Commission (FCC) issued permits to CBS and NBC at the same time and intended WNBT and WCBW to sign on simultaneously on July 1, so no one station could claim to be the "first". WCBW's initial broadcast was the first local newscast aired on a commercial station in the country. Its assigned frequency was 60–66 MHz, now known as channel 3 but then referred to as Channel 2 in the 1940–46 alignment of the VHF band.

Program schedules were irregular through the summer and early fall of 1941. Regular daily operations began on October 29 and WCBW received a full broadcast license, its construction permit and commercial program authorization on March 10, 1942. After the war, the FCC re-allocated the television and FM bands. WCBW closed down its operation on the old channel 2 at the end of February 1946 (the 60–66 MHz band had been re-allocated to WPTZ in Philadelphia as channel 3) to move to a new channel 2 at 54–60 MHz. It quickly began operation on the new frequency, where it remained from the spring of 1946 for the next 63 years until the end of analog full power television service in the late spring of 2009.

After the FCC allowed television stations owned by radio stations in the same city to use the same call letters as the radio station with the suffix "-TV", the call letters were changed to WCBS-TV on November 1, 1946. The change coincided with the renaming of CBS' New York radio stations, WABC (880 AM) and WABC-FM (101.1), as WCBS (now WHSQ) and WCBS-FM.

=== Later analog years (1951–2008) ===
On February 26, 1951, WCBS-TV became the first station to broadcast a regularly scheduled feature film series, The Late Show. On August 11, 1951, WCBS-TV broadcast the first baseball game on color television, between the Brooklyn Dodgers and Boston Braves from Ebbets Field. As were all color programs at the time, it was transmitted via a field-sequential color system developed by CBS. Signals transmitted this way could not be seen on existing black-and-white sets. The CBS color system was scrapped after the FCC embraced the alternative RCA all-electronic dot sequential system, which was fully compatible with the existing monochrome television standard, late in 1953. However, CBS telecast few programs in color, either locally or through the network, until the mid-1960s when color television sets became more affordable to the American public.

In May 1997, the station adopted the "CBS 2" branding, along with sister stations KCBS-TV in Los Angeles and WBBM-TV in Chicago, while retaining a unique and distinctive logo.

WCBS-TV's over-the air signal was not affected by the September 11 terrorist attacks that destroyed the World Trade Center. Unlike its competitors, channel 2 had long maintained a full-powered backup transmitter at the Empire State Building after moving its main transmitter to the North Tower of the then-new World Trade Center in 1975. The station's coverage of the attacks was also simulcast nationally on Viacom (which owned CBS at the time) cable network VH1 that day. In the immediate aftermath of the attacks, WCBS-TV was briefly the only full-coverage over-the-air television service operating in New York City, although the station lent transmission time to other stations who had lost their transmitters until they found suitable backup equipment and locations. The backup transmitter had been put into operation once before, when the World Trade Center bombing of February 26, 1993, knocked most of the area's stations off the air for a week.

=== Digital era ===
WCBS-TV ended regular programming on its analog signal, over VHF channel 2, at 2 p.m. on June 12, 2009, as part of the federally mandated transition from analog to digital television. The station moved its digital signal from its pre-transition UHF channel 56, which was among the high band UHF channels (52–69) that were removed from broadcasting use as a result of the transition, to channel 33, using virtual channel 2. Since the station qualified for the nightlight clause in the DTV Delay Act, WCBS kept its analog signal on for one month to provide public service announcements, starting at 3 p.m. on June 12 and permanently shutting it down during the early morning hours of July 13, 2009; this possibly made it the last full power NTSC broadcast television station in the United States to discontinue analog transmissions.

Digital subchannel 2.2, branded as CBS New York Plus, was launched in November 2011 as a 24-hour news channel drawing upon the resources of WCBS-TV, WCBS radio (880 AM), WINS (1010 AM), and WFAN (660 AM). The Plus service was eventually planned to be rolled out to CBS' other owned-and-operated stations, but only WCBS and KYW-TV in Philadelphia added Plus channel services.

On December 12, 2011, CBS Television Stations announced its intent to purchase Riverhead, New York–licensed WLNY-TV (channel 55), later announced for a purchase price of $55 million, creating a duopoly with WCBS-TV. The company announced that it would add additional on-air staff and expand WLNY's local news programming (at the time, that station had only an 11 p.m. newscast). The FCC approved the sale on January 31, 2012, and CBS took control of the station on March 30. WLNY suspended its own news operations the previous day and began airing WCBS-TV produced newscasts on July 2, 2012.

WCBS-TV as of February 2012 has a construction permit for a digital fill-in translator on channel 22, to be licensed to Plainview, New York, which would serve portions of eastern and central Long Island where WCBS-TV's signal is affected by the presence of WFSB, a CBS affiliate in Hartford, Connecticut, which also broadcasts on channel 33. In 2016, WCBS-TV returned to transmitting from One World Trade Center in lower Manhattan.

On October 21, 2014, CBS and Weigel Broadcasting announced the launch of a new digital subchannel service called Decades, scheduled to launch on all CBS-owned stations on May 25, 2015, including on WCBS-TV on channel 2.2. The channel is co-owned by CBS and Weigel (owner of CBS affiliate WDJT-TV in Milwaukee), with Weigel being responsible for distribution to non-CBS-owned stations. It airs programs from the extensive library of CBS Television Distribution (now CBS Media Ventures), including archival footage from CBS News. On September 3, 2018, Decades was replaced on 2.2 by Start TV. (Decades returned to the New York market in October 2019, when it was added to WNYW channel 5.5 as part of an agreement between Weigel and Fox Television Stations).

As a result of the 2016–17 FCC spectrum incentive auction, WCBS-TV moved its digital signal from channel 33 to channel 36 on August 1, 2019.

On December 12, 2018, WCBS-TV in cooperation with CBS Interactive, launched CBSN New York—a local version and partner of the CBSN service. CBS News New York can be accessed from cbsnewyork.com, cbsnews.com, and its respective mobile and streaming apps.

On December 4, 2019, CBS Corporation and Viacom remerged; WCBS and WLNY therefore became part of ViacomCBS (now Paramount Skydance).

== Programming ==
=== News operation ===
Current logo for CBS News New York.

Currently, WCBS-TV presently broadcasts 33 hours, 35 minutes of local news programming a week (with 5 hours, 5 minutes each weekday; 3 hours, 35 minutes on Saturdays; and 4 hours, 35 minutes on Sundays).

Upon becoming commercial station WCBW in 1941, the station broadcast two daily news programs, at 2:30 and 7:30 p.m. weekdays, anchored by Richard Hubbell. Most of the newscasts featured Hubbell reading a script with only occasional cutaways to a map or still photograph. When Pearl Harbor was bombed on December 7, 1941, WCBW (which was usually off the air on Sunday to give the engineers a day off), took to the air at 8:45 p.m. that Sunday with an extensive special report. The national emergency even broke down the unspoken wall between CBS radio and television. WCBW executives convinced radio announcers and experts such as George Fielding Elliot and Linton Wells to come down to the Grand Central Station studios during the evening and give information and commentary on the attack. The WCBW special report that night lasted less than 90 minutes. But that special broadcast pushed the limits of live television in 1941 and opened up new possibilities for future broadcasts. As CBS wrote in a special report to the FCC, the unscheduled live news broadcast on December 7 "was unquestionably the most stimulating challenge and marked the greatest advance of any single problem faced up to that time". Additional newscasts were scheduled in the early days of the war. In May 1942, WCBW (like almost all television stations) sharply cut back its live program schedule and the newscasts were canceled, since the station temporarily suspended studio operations, resorting exclusively to the occasional broadcast of films. This was primarily due to the fact that much of the staff had either joined the service or were redeployed to war-related technical research, and to prolong the life of the early, unstable cameras which were now impossible to repair due to the wartime lack of parts.

In May 1944, as the war began to turn in favor of the Allies, WCBW reopened the studios and the newscasts returned, briefly anchored by Ned Calmer, and then by Everett Holles. After the war, expanded news programs appeared on the WCBW schedule—renamed WCBS-TV in 1946—first anchored by Milo Boulton and later by Douglas Edwards. On May 3, 1948, Douglas Edwards began anchoring CBS Television News, a regular 15-minute nightly newscast on the rudimentary CBS network, including WCBS-TV. It aired every weeknight at 7:30 p.m. and was the first regularly scheduled network television news program featuring an anchor. The NBC television network's offering at the time NBC Television Newsreel (premiering in February 1948) was simply film with voice narration. In 1950, the name of the nightly news was changed to Douglas Edwards with the News, and the following year, it became the first news program to be broadcast on both coasts, thanks to a new coaxial cable connection, prompting Edwards to use the greeting "Good evening everyone, coast to coast." The broadcast was renamed the CBS Evening News when Walter Cronkite replaced Edwards in 1962. Edwards remained with CBS News with various daytime television newscasts and radio news broadcasts until his retirement on April 1, 1988.

In the 1950s through the mid-1960s, WCBS-TV's local newscasts were anchored by CBS News correspondents Robert Trout (at 7 pm) and by Don Hollenbeck and later Douglas Edwards (at 11 pm). Beginning in 1965, production of local news broadcasts on WCBS-TV and other CBS-owned television stations, which had been previously produced by CBS News, were taken over by the local stations. Trout and Edwards were succeeded by Jim Jensen. Jensen had only come to WCBS-TV a year earlier (he had been at WBZ-TV in Boston), but was already well known for his coverage of Robert F. Kennedy's 1964 campaign for the United States Senate. During the 1960s, WCBS-TV battled WNBC-TV (channel 4) for the top-rated news department in New York City. After WABC-TV (channel 7) introduced Eyewitness News in the late 1960s, WCBS-TV went back and forth in first place with Channel 7, in a rivalry that continued through the 1970s. For much of the early 1980s, New York's "Big Three" stations took turns in the top spot. During this time, three of the longest-tenured anchor teams in New York – Jensen and Rolland Smith, WABC-TV's Roger Grimsby and Bill Beutel, and WNBC-TV's Chuck Scarborough and Sue Simmons – went head-to-head with each other. On January 25, 1982, WCBS-TV debuted its 5 p.m. weekday newscast. WCBS-TV had many well-known personalities during this era: anchors Dave Marash, Rolland Smith, Michele Marsh and Vic Miles; meteorologists Frank Field and John Coleman; reporters Meredith Vieira, Randall Pinkston, Tony Guida, John Stossel and Arnold Díaz and sportscaster Warner Wolf. Vieira, Pinkston and Guida later moved to the CBS network.

In 1988, controversy involving an exchange between Jim Jensen and co-anchor Bree Walker, whose fingers and toes are fused together as a result of the condition ectrodactyly. After Walker did a report about her experience with the condition, Jensen asked Walker, on the air, if her parents would have aborted her had they known she would have been born with the condition. Walker kept her composure on air but soon left the station. The incident took place shortly before Jensen's entry to drug rehabilitation. As the 1990s began, Channel 2 found itself increasingly losing its ratings share to WNBC. On August 31, 1992, Channel 2 debuted its one-hour weekday morning newscast, this time with the anchor team of Morry Alter and Lisa Rudolph, Jay Trelease with traffic, and Craig Allen with weather. In late 1994 Jensen was taken off the anchor desk and demoted to host of a Sunday morning public-affairs show, Sunday Edition. He also hosted a few episodes of the regular Sports Update show on Sunday nights at 11:30 pm. At the time, Jensen had served as an anchor longer than anyone in New York television history (he has since been passed by WABC-TV's Beutel and WNBC's Scarborough). In 1995, Jensen was forced to retire shortly after the Westinghouse Electric Corporation announced it was buying CBS. By the end of 1995, Channel 2's ratings were in last place for the first time in its history, while WNBC's ratings had risen to second place – a pecking order that would remain in place for eleven years. The station's news branding change from Channel 2 News to just 2 News during that time, contributed to the station's last-place finish in the February 1996 sweeps period.

==== 1996 "massacre": Mass firings and format changes ====
On October 2, 1996, the station executed an unprecedented mass firing without any advance warning, citing the need to shake up its news operation. Seven people were fired: anchors John Johnson, Michele Marsh and Tony Guida; sports anchor Bernie Smilovitz (who promptly returned to his previous station, WDIV in Detroit); and reporters Reggie Harris, Roseanne Colletti and Magee Hickey. The firings came after the 6 p.m. newscast. Johnson and Marsh had anchored the 5 p.m. newscasts and signed off at 6 p.m. saying, "We'll see you at 11," but never got a chance to say goodbye on the air.

The "massacre", as it has come to be known, was part of a move enacted by then-news director Bill Carey to boost ratings, although it came at a time when CBS was under pressure to boost revenues, having just merged with Westinghouse. It was also part of a major reconstruction of the newscast, culminating in the May 1997 rebranding to News 2; two months prior, Warner Wolf had returned to the station, having left in 1992 for WUSA-TV, the CBS affiliate in Washington.

When the News 2 name was put in place, a format change was also instituted, going for a faster-paced newscast with more stories; this was reinforced by reminders that News 2 had "More news in less time, every time" and a "Rundown" of stories to come. A new, bold and italicized "2" logo, contained in a blue or white slanted box alongside the CBS eye, replaced the long-running Futura "2" used in some form since the 1980s; the overall station branding switched from New York's Channel 2 to simply CBS 2 at this point, remaining the primary brand of the station to this day. After a year, little to no progress in the ratings was made, so this format was done away with; a new "virtual studio" format (involving CGI being used to depict sections of the news studio that did not exist in reality), alongside bright, orange and white graphics and a "club" remix of WBBM-TV's "This is Chicago, Chicago's My Town" theme (which the station has used in various forms for all but a few years since 1982) was tried out. This did not work either, so this approach was also abandoned, in favor of a more "traditional" newscast. The "club" remix of the WBBM theme would continue to be used until early 2000.

==== CBS 2 News ====
In 2000, Joel Cheatwood, creator of the 7 News format at WSVN in Miami, was appointed as the station's news director. At his suggestion, the newscasts were rebranded from News 2 to the CBS 2 Information Network, using "content partners" such as U.S. News & World Report and VH1. He also gave the newscasts more of a tabloid feel. While considerably watered down compared to Bill Applegate's work at WBBM-TV in Chicago, John Lippmann's work at KCBS-TV in Los Angeles, Fox flagship WNYW, and Cheatwood's work at WSVN – and even compared to WSVN's sister station, WHDH in Boston—it was much flashier than had been seen on New York's "Big Three" affiliates. He also retooled the 11 p.m. report as a "gritty, down-to-earth" style newscast, termed Nightcast. At this point, the station was sharing studio space with CBS Sports (after previously sharing street-side studios with CBS' then-morning newscast, The Early Show). It also began usage of two different music packages from Edd Kalehoff (who had composed WNBC's "We're 4 New York" campaign and "NBC Stations" package that was in use at the time), one for the normal newscasts titled "WCBS Grand", which began alongside the debut of the 4 p.m. news, and another package especially intended for Nightcast. It did not work, and Cheatwood was gone by 2002 in favor of New York veteran news director Dianne Doctor. The station became simply CBS 2, and gradually phased out the tabloid elements, the Information Network, and Nightcast. In its place, Doctor introduced a "news for the people" approach similar to that of her previous employer, WNBC. The Kalehoff-produced themes were replaced with the John Hegner-produced "News in Focus" which sister KCBS had used starting in 1997 (and had replaced just days before WCBS adopted the package). Several pieces of "WCBS Grand" have since been recycled by Kalehoff as music cues on The Price Is Right under the title "Grandeur". The graphics and logo mainly became blue and silver, with that color motif remaining to this day (albeit with the addition of gold) with successive graphics packages, including the last several which have been shared with most of the other stations in the CBS O&O group.

After Doctor's arrival, WCBS placed a revived emphasis on hard news, while attempting to revive some elements of its glory days. For instance, in 2003 Arnold Diaz rejoined the station to revive "Shame on You", an Emmy Award–winning series of investigative segments. He had worked at the station from 1973 to 1995, leaving to serve a similar investigative role at ABC News. In December 2005, Diaz once again departed, this time leaving for WNYW. Another segment was "Eat at Your Own Risk", which highlighted unsafe conditions at New York-area restaurants. Ironically, the cafeteria at the CBS Broadcast Center was cited for violations by the New York City Department of Health and Mental Hygiene. Violations included the presence of rats and roaches, as well as food temperature issues.

Despite this and other attempts at fixes, the ratings did not significantly improve under Doctor's watch. Doctor was criticized for airing "Shame on You" and "Eat at Your Own Risk" segments ahead of major stories. She also came under fire when channel 2 led its 11 p.m. newscast of May 24, 2005, with a story and exclusive video of actor Burt Reynolds slapping a CBS producer, while rivals WABC-TV and WNBC-TV led with an important vote in the U.S. House on stem cell research.

On May 27, 2004, Doctor fired popular sports anchor Warner Wolf, three months before his contract expired, without giving Wolf a chance to say goodbye on air. This incident was widely panned by several newspapers, including the New York Daily News, and the move alienated and angered many viewers. Wolf was replaced by the much younger Chris Wragge, who was brought in from NBC affiliate KPRC-TV in Houston. On June 1, 2005, Jim Rosenfield rejoined the station to anchor the 5 and 11 p.m. newscasts with Roz Abrams, who joined channel 2 the previous year after an 18-year run at WABC-TV. The son of a former CBS executive, Rosenfield had worked at the station from 1998 to 2000 before moving to WNBC (to anchor Live at Five) after a contract dispute with channel 2. Rosenfield replaced Ernie Anastos, who moved to WNYW in July 2005.

On August 22, 2005, WCBS-TV launched its new Doppler weather radar named "Live Doppler 2 Million". It has one million watts of power, and is live, compared to other dopplers in the market which are delayed by about 15 minutes. "Live Doppler 2 Million" was the punch line of a joke on an episode of Jimmy Kimmel Live! and was ridiculed on the popular Opie and Anthony radio show. The station renamed the radar in 2006 to "Live Doppler". The station also uses the VIPIR radar processing software. Coincidentally, transportation reporter Arthur Chi'en was fired from the station three months earlier after mistakenly using expletives live on the air in response to someone from Opie and Anthony disrupting his live report as part of their "Assault on the Media" contest. On April 14, 2006, Dianne Doctor left WCBS-TV. The station decided to move its news department in a new direction under new general manager Peter Dunn, who axed "Shame on You" and "Eat at Your Own Risk". Doctor reportedly did not agree with the new plans, and opted to leave. The station has since overhauled its graphics and anchor lineup, winning praise from media observers.

==== Partnership with The Weather Channel; ratings improvement ====
In early September 2006, WCBS-TV's weather department entered into a partnership with The Weather Channel, with meteorologists from the cable channel often appearing on-air with existing WCBS-TV meteorologists. WCBS-TV also received information from The Weather Channel, in addition to using its radars and satellite imagery. The Weather Channel featured updates with WCBS for New York City's weather on its Evening Edition program with one of the WCBS meteorologists, and forecast intros on WCBS began with "now time for your exclusive forecast from CBS 2 and The Weather Channel". On July 7, 2008, this partnership ended when it was announced that The Weather Channel had been sold to NBCUniversal (owner of competitor WNBC).

==== Personnel change ====
On November 6, 2006, WCBS-TV made a personnel change on its noon and 5 p.m. newscasts. Former sports director and anchor Chris Wragge became co-anchor of both programs, along with newly hired Kristine Johnson; both replaced Roz Abrams and Mary Calvi on those newscasts; Abrams' contract was allowed to lapse, and Calvi was reassigned to weekends as the sole evening anchor. Calvi co-anchored on mornings with Rob Morrison. More changes came on December 25, 2006, as John Elliot was introduced as the new morning and noon meteorologist, replacing Audrey Puente, whose abrupt breach-of-contract demotion led to her being allowed to become the new chief meteorologist at WWOR-TV less than two weeks later. WCBS-TV also hired Lonnie Quinn, who had been a weatherman in Miami, as they phased out John Bolaris, who had rejoined WCBS in 2002. On June 25, 2007, Wragge and Johnson added the 11 p.m. newscast to their duties, trading places with Dana Tyler and Jim Rosenfield on the noon program; Tyler and Rosenfield continued to co-anchor the 6 p.m. newscast. Rosenfield left WCBS in May 2008 and was replaced with recently hired weekend anchor Don Dahler.

==== Improvement in ratings, new set ====
In the February 2007 ratings period, WCBS-TV finished second behind WABC-TV from sign-on to sign-off – its best showing in 16 years, although most of its newscasts still finished in third place at that time. By the November 2007 sweeps period, channel 2's local evening newscasts had overtaken WNBC for second place (mainly due to declining ratings at WNBC). It was channel 2's best news performance in 12 years, but it still trailed WABC-TV by a fairly wide margin. On April 11, 2007, WCBS-TV became the third New York City television station to begin broadcasting its newscasts in high-definition. In May 2008, WCBS led WNBC by an even wider margin. However, its longtime No. 1 noon newscast's ratings fell behind WABC, the only other station to offer a noon newscast in the New York area. WCBS has been unable to regain the lead at noon since, although they were still second in New York City among the market's evening broadcasts at the time.

WCBS elected to change the noon anchors again after approximately a year and put the noon broadcast in the hands of the morning news team; the then-current anchors were Maurice DuBois and Mary Calvi with John Elliott providing weather forecasts. DuBois has since switched to anchoring the weeknight 5 and 11 p.m. newscasts with Johnson (with Wragge moving to The Early Show; he later returned to anchor WCBS's 6 p.m. weekday broadcast with Dana Tyler) and is now partnered with Calvi weekday mornings and at noon.

==== WCBS-TV today ====
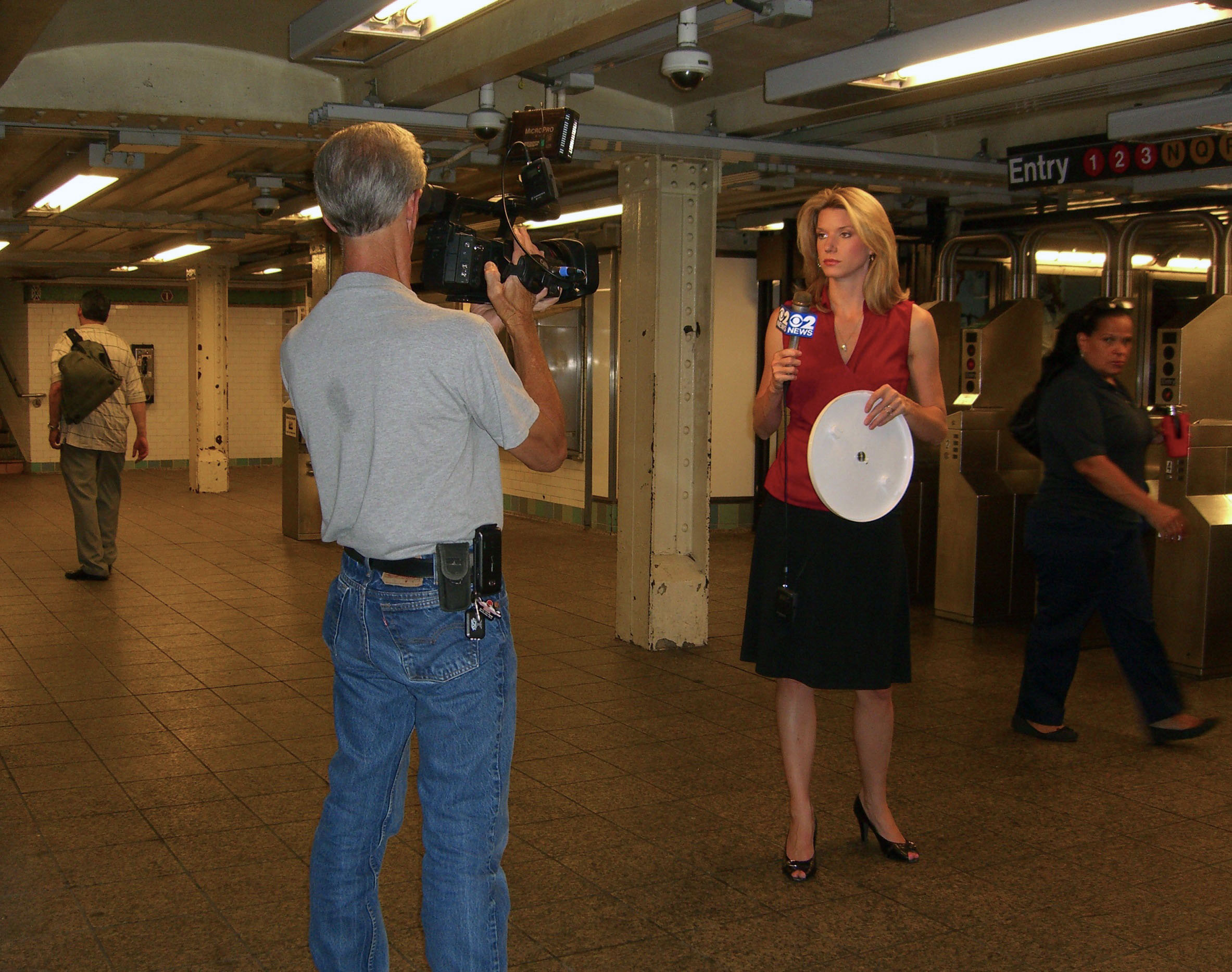
Reporter Kathryn Brown reporting on the Summer 2012 North American heat wave from the Times Square subway station on July 18, 2012.

In the February 2011 Nielsen sweeps period, WCBS-TV's 11 p.m. newscast unseated WABC-TV for first place in total households in that timeslot. WABC continued to lead in the key demographics at 11 pm. WCBS-TV quickly lost its lead at 11 p.m. after WABC-TV regained its status as No. 1 at 11 p.m. in the May 2011 sweeps. WABC-TV has since kept its No. 1 status at 11 pm. Recently, WCBS-TV has fallen back to third place due to an increase in ratings at WNBC.

On March 12 and 13, 2020, WCBS-TV's evening newscasts were produced by Los Angeles sister station KCBS-TV, and its morning newscasts originated from KPIX-TV in San Francisco, after the CBS Broadcast Center was closed for disinfection due to two employees testing positive for COVID-19, with weathercasts being originated from the weather department's mobile broadcast unit. Newscasts resumed from the Broadcast Center that weekend; however, on March 18, the Broadcast Center was again shut down and production was transferred back to KCBS-TV. On March 20, WCBS-TV began to originate newscasts with their regular talent from the Stamford, Connecticut, studios of YES Network, which were otherwise dark due to the delay of Major League Baseball's upcoming season due to the pandemic, before moving back again to the Broadcast Center, beginning on April 17, with the morning newscast.

Maurice DuBois was promoted to co-anchor of the CBS Evening News with John Dickerson in January 2025, and subsequently departed WCBS-TV to focus on the national broadcast; both men would leave the Evening News near the end of the same year, being replaced in early January 2026 by network anchor and reporter Tony Dokoupil, as part of major changes within the network's news division at that time.

=== Sports programming ===
From 1956 until 1993, WCBS-TV carried most New York Giants games through the network's coverage of the National Football League. CBS lost the rights to the National Football Conference (NFC) to Fox in 1994, resulting in Giants games moving to WNYW; currently, Giants preseason games are carried by NBC owned-and-operated station WNBC (with WWOR-TV being served as an overflow station if the Summer Olympics conflicts with the preseason schedule). After a 5-year absence, the NFL returned to CBS and WCBS-TV in 1998 through a package of American Football Conference (AFC) games; the station currently airs New York Jets preseason games and most regular season games, along with occasional Giants games, usually when the team plays host to an AFC opponent at MetLife Stadium (or, since 2014, through the 'cross-flex' broadcast rules, any Giants games where they play another NFC team that are moved from Fox to CBS). The station also aired occasional Jets games when they played at home to an NFC team from 1970 to 1993. During the regular season, some Jets games are rotated with WNBC (through NBC Sunday Night Football), WNYW (through NFL on Fox and Thursday Night Football), WABC-TV (through Monday Night Football), WPIX (through Monday Night Football, if WABC-TV is not airing them and select TNF telecasts not carried by Fox's package it shares with NFL Network), and in rare cases, WWOR-TV (through Monday Night Football). The station has aired the Giants' victory in Super Bowl XXI and loss in Super Bowl XXXV.

In 1980, WCBS-TV aired game six of the Stanley Cup Final via an episode of CBS Sports Spectacular, where the New York Islanders won their first of four straight Stanley Cups. In 2021 and 2022, the station aired the New York City ePrix after the network acquired the rights to broadcast Formula E races.

In 2002, WCBS-TV acquired the over-the-air rights to New York Yankees baseball games, replacing Fox owned-and-operated station WNYW. The games, produced by the new YES Network, remained on the station until the 2004 season; the rights moved to UPN affiliate (now MyNetworkTV owned-and-operated station) WWOR-TV beginning in 2005. It also aired any Yankees or Mets games as part of CBS' MLB broadcast contract from 1990 to 1993.

WCBS-TV also served as the official regional host station of the 1996 NCAA Men's Final Four which was held at Continental Airlines Arena.

=== Notable on-air staff ===
==== Current ====
- Tony Aiello – general assignment reporter
- Craig Allen – weekend morning meteorologist
- Dick Brennan – general assignment reporter and fill-in anchor
- Mary Calvi – anchor
- Alice Gainer – general assignment reporter and fill-in anchor
- Carolyn Gusoff – Long Island reporter
- Cindy Hsu – anchor
- Kristine Johnson – anchor
- Marcia Kramer – chief political reporter
- Otis Livingston – sports anchor
- Jessica Moore – anchor and general assignment reporter
- Lonnie Quinn – chief weathercaster
- Chris Wragge – anchor

==== Former ====
- Roz Abrams
- Al Albert
- Steve Albert
- Vanessa Alfano
- Morry Alter
- Ernie Anastos
- Tiki Barber
- Steve Bartelstein
- Pat Battle
- Bruce Beck
- Shosh Bedrosian
- Len Berman
- John Bolaris
- Jim Bouton
- Richard Brown
- Maureen Bunyan
- Tracee Carrasco
- Duke Castiglione
- Ti-Hua Chang
- Julie Chen
- Alexis Christoforous – business reporter
- Linda Church
- John Coleman
- Penny Crone
- Chet Curtis
- Don Dahler
- Vince DeMentri
- Arnold Díaz
- Diane Dimond
- Maurice DuBois
- Tom Dunn
- Douglas Edwards
- Linda Ellerbee
- Tamsen Fadal
- Frank Field
- Storm Field
- Elise Finch
- Ira Joe Fisher
- Jack Ford
- Emily Frances
- Shon Gables
- Leeza Gibbons
- Frank Gifford
- Megan Glaros
- Dr. Max Gomez – medical reporter
- Amanda Grove (1999–2002)
- Tony Guida
- Brett Haber
- Lester Holt
- Huell Howser
- Carol Iovanna
- Jim Jensen
- Weijia Jiang
- John Johnson
- Sara Lee Kessler
- Sukanya Krishnan
- Tamara Leitner
- Steve Levy
- Pia Lindström
- Lynda Lopez
- Kerri Lyon
- Diane Macedo
- Josh Mankiewicz
- Dave Marash
- Sal Marchiano
- Michele Marsh (1979–1996)
- Carol Martin
- Todd McDermott
- Jim McKay
- Rob Morrison
- Paul Moyer
- Jill Nicolini
- Bill O'Reilly
- Ralph Penza
- Randall Pinkston
- Mike Pomeranz
- Dave Price
- Shimon Prokupecz
- Audrey Puente
- Carol Reed
- John Roberts
- Jim Rosenfield
- Jim Ryan
- John Schriffen
- Joel Siegel
- Dave Sims
- Rolland Smith
- John Stossel
- Amy Stone
- Kate Sullivan
- Mike Taibbi
- John Tesh
- Robert Trout
- Dana Tyler – anchor; host of Eye on New York
- Earl Ubell
- Jane Velez-Mitchell
- Meredith Vieira
- Bree Walker
- Robb Weller
- Brian Williams
- Joe Witte
- Warner Wolf
- Bob Young

== Technical information ==
=== Subchannels ===
The station's signal is multiplexed:

Subchannels of WCBS-TV
Subchannel	Res.	Short name	Programming
2.1	1080i	WCBS-HD	CBS
2.2	480i	STARTTV	Start TV
2.3	480i	DABL	Dabl
2.4	480i	365BLK	365BLK
2.5	480i	COMET	Comet
21.2	480i	CREATE	Create (WLIW)

Broadcast on behalf of another station

=== Translator ===
- WCBS-TV (DRT) 22 Riverhead

== See also ==
- Early television stations
- Media in New York City
- New Yorkers in journalism
- WCBS-FM (101.1 MHz)
- WHSQ, formerly WCBS (AM) (880 kHz)
