= Live at Five (TV program) =

American local television newscast (1979–2007)

- Created by: Ron Kershaw; Bob Davis
- Country of origin: United States
- Original language: English

Production
- Production locations: Studio 6B, 30 Rockefeller Plaza, New York City
- Camera setup: Multi-camera
- Running time: 60 minutes

Original release
- Network: WNBC
- Release: 1979 – September 7, 2007

Live at Five was a local afternoon television news program that aired on WNBC (channel 4), the NBC flagship television station in New York City. The hour-long program was broadcast from Studio 6B at 30 Rockefeller Plaza in Midtown Manhattan. Featuring a mix of news, features, and interviews, the Live at Five concept was first introduced in 1979 by WNBC news director Ron Kershaw and Bob Davis; its final broadcast aired on September 7, 2007.

== History ==
Live at Five was born of necessity; the 5 p.m. broadcast was part of a two-hour early evening news block called NewsCenter 4 which combined features and hard news, and attempted to compete with old movies and syndicated programming that aired on its competitors in the time period. The first anchors of Live at Five were Pia Lindström and Melba Tolliver; Jack Cafferty joined the anchor chair a few months later. When ratings for the news block crumbled in 1980, WNBC decided to pour its resources into its 6 p.m. newscast, which would feature its best reporters, while the 5 p.m. newscast would be more of an interview and lifestyle program with news headlines featured at the top of the show.

In October 1980, Sue Simmons joined the WNBC and Live at Five team from Washington, D.C. sister station WRC-TV. Simmons had several co-anchors, or as she colloquially called them "anchor husbands", including Cafferty, Tony Guida, Matt Lauer, Dean Shepherd and Jim Rosenfield. From 1980 to 1991, announcer Don Pardo performed the talent introductions and other voice overs, usually live in-studio.

In the 1980s, the show reached popularity with guests ranging from Jimmy Carter to Orson Welles to Little Richard. The show's impressive guest lineup was fodder for a running joke on NBC's Late Night with David Letterman, which taped simultaneously across the hall from WNBC's news studio in Studio 6A, where Letterman complained that Live at Five got better guests than he did. It was not unusual for Letterman to venture out of his studio with a portable camera, and interview Live at Five staffers manning the doors, or guests coming and going, or even crashing, live and unannounced, the Live at Five set. The program continued to maintain an impressive guest lineup well into the 2000s, with everyone from Broadway stars to NFL football players to politicians coming to Studio 6B to be interviewed.

Live at Five was originally cancelled in September 1991 and replaced by a traditional newscast known as News 4 New York at 5, anchored by Simmons and Chuck Scarborough. This format did not stay long, however – Simmons was paired with Matt Lauer for a new iteration of Live at Five, originating from the Window on the World studios used for NBC's Today. Shortly afterwards, Live at Five was moved back to 30 Rockefeller Center and adopted a more traditional news-based format in September 1993.

In 2005, Jim Rosenfeld left WNBC to return to WCBS-TV (channel 2). His replacement was Perri Peltz, who worked for WNBC in the late 1980s and early 1990s. The 5 p.m. edition of WABC-TV (channel 7)'s Channel 7 Eyewitness News also had two female anchors; first with veterans Roz Abrams and Diana Williams, then with Sade Baderinwa when Abrams left for WCBS-TV in 2004; and in April 2006, WCBS switched to the two-female-anchor format at 5 p.m. with Roz Abrams and Mary Calvi, who anchored together until November 6, 2006. At one point in time, three major market stations had leading female anchors at 5:00 p.m.

Several stations throughout the United States (among them many NBC affiliates) attempted to copy the Live at Five format or just rebranded their newscast "Live at Five" or some variant thereof (such as Cleveland ABC affiliate WEWS, which titled its similarly formatted 5 p.m. newscast, Live on 5, referencing the station's assigned broadcast channel).

WNBC's Live at Five broadcast was discontinued on September 10, 2007, in favor of a new 7 p.m. newscast anchored by Chuck Scarborough. The syndicated entertainment newsmagazine Extra replaced Live at Five at its former timeslot. For a while, WNBC moved its 5:30 newscast back to 5 p.m. (bumping Extra to the 5:30 slot), but did not return the Live at Five name to the newscast. Once again, Sue Simmons anchored the program, with David Ushery as co-anchor; the current 5 p.m. newscast continues to use the general News 4 New York brand rather than the Live at Five brand.
