= Tony Guida =

American television reporter and anchor

Tony Guida (born November 5, 1941) is a New York-based local television and radio personality. He is currently a news anchor for WCBS Newsradio 880 and a business correspondent for CBS News.

== Life and career ==
Guida began his career working as a reporter for WSAV-TV, Savannah, GA, and then for G.E.’s WRGB Television in Albany/ Schenectady, NY. Guida's career in New York City began in 1970 at New York television station WOR-TV (now WWOR-TV) as a reporter and later in 1971 as co-anchor of that station's former 7pm newscast. In 1972, Guida went to WNBC as a weekend co-anchor, later becoming Chief Political Reporter for the station. For a brief period in 1979, Guida was also a news anchor (succeeding Floyd Kalber) on the NBC Today program. In 1981, Guida joined WCBS-TV as Chief Political Reporter. In 1986, Guida re-joined WNBC-TV as Chief Political Reporter, and in 1989, Guida was promoted to co-anchor of Live at Five. In 1991 when the Live at Five moniker was briefly dropped from WNBC-TV, Guida was made co-anchor of Today in New York.

Guida was unhappy with his move; when his contract with the station expired in 1992, Guida was offered a job to anchor a new noon newscast which did not start until 1995. Guida would also be responsible for keeping his co-hosting duties on Today In New York. Guida turned this offer down when he accepted WCBS-TV's offer as a senior reporter. In 1993, Guida added 5pm co-anchor to his reporting duties. In 1994, Guida was switched from 5pm to 6pm co-anchor.

In 1995, Guida replaced Jim Jensen as co-anchor of WCBS-TV's Sunday morning public affairs program, Sunday Edition. That same year, Guida was made co-anchor of the 5pm and 11pm newscasts for a short period of time after John Roberts left to join CBS News and before John Johnson joined from WABC-TV. Guida kept his other WCBS-TV duties during this short period of time. In 1996, Guida, along with Johnson, Michele Marsh and other WCBS-TV anchors were fired from the station.

Guida was later hired as lead anchor for a new station launched by Dow Jones & Company, WBIS-TV, which offered a hybrid format of sporting events and business news. When that station was sold to Paxson Communications in 1997, Guida joined CNNfn as a daytime anchor. During that period of time, Guida filled in for Lou Dobbs on Moneyline, a business news show that aired on both CNN and CNNfn and is now known as Lou Dobbs Tonight. In 2001, Guida was yet again a part of a mass firing, this time at CNN. Later that year, Guida joined WCBS-AM as an anchor where he anchored coverage of the September 11, 2001 attacks throughout that day. In the past few years, Guida has filed reports for the Saturday Edition of the CBS Evening News, and for MSNBC where he has served as a backup anchor for Countdown with Keith Olbermann.

In 2005 Guida supplied the voice of the Newsreader in the Activision PC video game The Movies.

Between 2015 and 2023 Guida hosted a 30-minute talk show Tony Guida's NY on CUNY TV.
