= Roz Abrams =

American television news journalist (born 1948)

- Born: Roslyn Maria Abrams; September 7, 1948 (age 78); Lansing, Michigan, U.S.
- Education: Western Michigan University (BS); University of Michigan
- Occupation: Journalist
- Years active: 1975–2006
- Notable credit(s): Anchor, WCBS/Channel 2 (2004–2006); Anchor, WABC/Channel 7 (1986–2003); Anchor, CNN (1982–1983)
- Spouse: Kenneth Showers (deceased)

Roslyn Maria Abrams (born September 7, 1948) is an American former television news journalist. She had a long career as an anchor on Eyewitness News, which is broadcast by WABC-TV, working in Manhattan. More recently she worked for WCBS-TV, also in Manhattan, from 2004 to 2006.

== Early life and education ==
Abrams holds a Bachelor of Science degree from Western Michigan University, a master's degree from the University of Michigan and an honorary doctorate of human letters from New York Institute of Technology.

== Career ==
Abrams received a New York Association of Black Journalists Award for the special "The Sounds of Harlem." She has been part of award-winning coverage for some of the biggest news stories from around the world, including AIDS, the Chernobyl disaster, the end of apartheid in South Africa, 9/11, and the Northeast blackout of 2003. She worked at WSB-AM radio from 1975 to 1978. She worked on television at WXIA-TV from 1978 to 1982, at CNN from 1982 to 1983, and at KRON-TV from 1983 to 1986.

In December 2003, Abrams was named to the Editorial Advisory Board of "Making Waves," the new quarterly publication of American women in radio and television. She is the current co-chair of NY READS TOGETHER a program sponsored by the New York Women's Agenda.

=== New York ===
==== WABC-TV and WCBS-TV ====
Before joining WCBS-TV in 2004, Abrams had spent 18 years at WABC-TV, beginning in February 1986, first as a general reporter and later as 5 p.m. co-anchor. This began Abrams's long association with the station. She stayed there until 2003.

Abrams then joined WCBS-TV as the co-anchor of "CBS2 News" at 5 and 11 p.m., and began appearing there on April 19, 2004. First she was paired with veteran New York news anchor Ernie Anastos, who had co-anchored WABC Eyewitness News with her in the 1980s, and then with Jim Rosenfield. In April 2006, she was moved from 11 p.m. to noon, co-anchoring with Mary Calvi. Abrams was replaced at 11 p.m. with veteran Dana Tyler (whom Abrams had replaced at 11 p.m. upon joining WCBS in 2003). In November 2006, however, Abrams left the air after WCBS-TV sports anchor Chris Wragge and newly hired Kristine Johnson (formerly of NBC News and MSNBC) became the anchors at noon and 5 p.m. (and eventually moved from noon to 11 p.m.).

== In popular culture ==
- In 2005, Abrams appeared as herself during a brief news segment in the feature film War of the Worlds, an adaptation of H. G. Wells novel of the same name, directed by Steven Spielberg and starring Tom Cruise.
- Abrams appeared in the 2008 film Pride and Glory, starring Ed Norton and Colin Farrell.
- Abrams appeared in the 2017 film Turn It Around: The Story of East Bay Punk, a documentary with a central focus on the emergence of the 924 Gilman Street music collective.

== See also ==
- New Yorkers in journalism
