= Chris Wragge =

American news anchor

- Born: Christian P. Wragge; June 19, 1970 (age 55); Hackensack, New Jersey, U.S.
- Occupation: News anchor
- Years active: 1991–present
- Spouses: Victoria Silvstedt (m. 2000; div. 2009) Sarah Siciliano (m. 2015)
- Children: 2
- Website: www.cbsnews.com/newyork/personality/chris-wragge/

Christian P. Wragge (/ˈræɡi/ RAG-ee; born June 19, 1970) is an American news anchor. He is the co-anchor for New York's CBS2's News This Morning and CBS2's News at Noon, alongside Mary Calvi. He was previously on WCBS's 5 p.m. and 11 p.m. broadcasts, until he moved to CBS's The Early Show (nationwide), where he served as morning co-anchor from January 2011 until January 6, 2012, when the broadcast was replaced.

== Career ==
Born in Hackensack, New Jersey and raised in Rutherford, Wragge moved to Mahwah as a pre-teen. He attended Mahwah High School, where he was an athlete. He received a football scholarship to the University of New Hampshire. He earned three varsity letters and graduated a year early with a Bachelor of Arts degree in communications to pursue a career in professional sportscasting.

Wragge became a sports reporter for WMUR-TV in Manchester, New Hampshire, where his first television appearance was as a reporter as part of a 48 Hours exposé on NBA Spring Break 1991. He then became anchor for the nightly sportscasts on WVIT, an NBC affiliate in Hartford, Connecticut. Wragge was also a reporter for NBC Sports, including the NBA, the WNBA, Notre Dame football, the Gator Bowl, the Sun America Sportsdesk, and the Olympics.

From 1996 to 1997, he was a correspondent with the nationally syndicated entertainment news show Entertainment Tonight. His first interview was with actor Kurt Russell. He went on to cover the Oscars, the Emmys, and the Grammys.

In 1998, Wragge joined NBC Sports and became Sports Director and anchor of the nightly sportscasts on News2Houston on KPRC-TV in Houston, Texas, and was the recipient of the 2002 Associated Press "Best Sportscast" award for the Houston area.

In December 2000, while still with NBC Sports and KPRC, Wragge joined USA Sports as the on-site correspondent for PGA Tour Sunday, the PGA Tour's leading broadcast partner. He also became presenter of the Ask DIY, HGTV and the Travel Channel.

In 2003 and 2004, Wragge was a behind-the-chutes reporter for the PBR's Built Ford Tough Series during their NBC telecasts, and during a couple of events served as the play-by-play announcer in George Michael's absence. In 2004, after long-time sportscaster Warner Wolf was abruptly fired, Wragge joined WCBS-TV as lead sports anchor. On November 6, 2006, Wragge become news anchor for CBS2 News at Noon and CBS News at 5 PM with newly hired Kristine Johnson. The pair replaced Mary Calvi and news veteran Roz Abrams.

On January 3, 2011, Wragge became the lead weekday anchor (with Erica Hill) for CBS News's The Early Show after serving as in the same role on the Saturday version for the past few years (while also working his primary job at WCBS). In September 2011, when Wragge was told of impending changes to the CBS morning program, he returned to WCBS, replacing Don Dahler as co-anchor for New York's WCBS-TV 6 p.m. weeknight telecast, alongside Dana Tyler. In July 2012, he and Tyler also became co-anchors of WLNY-TV 10/55's News at 9 p.m.

In February 2013, Wragge was moved to anchor CBS 2 News This Morning and CBS 2 News at Noon with alongside Mary Calvi replacing Rob Morrison due to Morrison's departure following a domestic violence incident. As a result, Dana Tyler works solo on CBS 2 News at 6PM.

Wragge has been a resident of Wyckoff, New Jersey, having moved there from Manhattan.
