= Lonnie Quinn =

American weather presenter (born 1963)

- Born: Lonnie William Quinn; August 9, 1963 (age 63); Cheshire, Connecticut, United States
- Education: Boston College
- Occupation: Meteorologist
- Years active: 2003–present
- Employer: WCBS-TV
- Notable work: CBS News New York
- Spouse: Sharon Quinn (m. 2007)
- Children: 2
- Website: cbsnewyork.com

Lonnie William Quinn (born August 9, 1963 in Cheshire, Connecticut) is the lead weather anchor on WCBS-TV in New York City. He also appears on the CBS Evening News and made frequent appearances on sister radio station WCBS-AM for their weather reports until the station went silent in 2024. Quinn formerly served as weather anchor for CBS This Morning Saturday.

== Career ==
A 14-time Emmy Award recipient, including for "Best Weather Anchor" in 2015, 2014, 2012, 2011 and 2010, Quinn joined CBS 2 in April 2007. He came to WCBS from WTVJ, the NBC owned and operated station in Miami, where he served as the weather anchor on "Today in South Florida" and won an Emmy award for "Best on Air Talent". In June 2007, he replaced John Bolaris, who moved to weekends only to finish out his contract.

During the 2005 hurricane season, Quinn worked closely with Max Mayfield, former director of the National Hurricane Center, while tracking the most active tropical season in history. Quinn also joined the Hurricane Hunters collecting data as they flew through the eye of Hurricane Isabel off the coast of North Carolina in 2003.

After changing careers from acting to broadcasting, his first newsroom job was at WVIR in Charlottesville, Virginia as evening news anchor and weekend weather anchor. Before that, he worked at several different stations in Charlottesville including WADA-LP, as an on-air personality at WQMZ-FM and as morning show co-host and news director at WVAO.

He graduated magna cum laude from Boston College with a bachelor's degree in communications, and swam for the Boston College swim team. He holds a Federal Aviation Administration certificate in meteorology and consistently works on advancing his formal meteorological training.

== Acting ==
During his brief acting career he was best known for creating the role of Will Cooney on ABC's All My Children (1988–1990). He also played Rich Landers on the former NBC soap opera Santa Barbara (1992–1993). He appeared as himself in two episodes of As the World Turns in November 2009.

== Family ==
Lonnie Quinn has six brothers and sisters. He lives in Westport, Connecticut with his wife, Sharon, and Nate, a son from a previous relationship, as well as daughters Lily and Savannah. His son Nate is studying at Cornell University and previously attended The Bronx High School of Science.

== See also ==
- New Yorkers in journalism
