= Bitsbox =

American coding education company

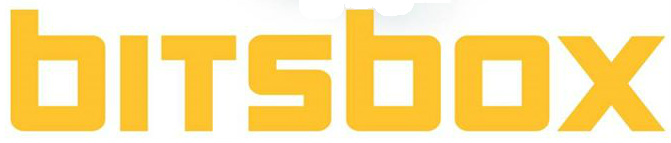

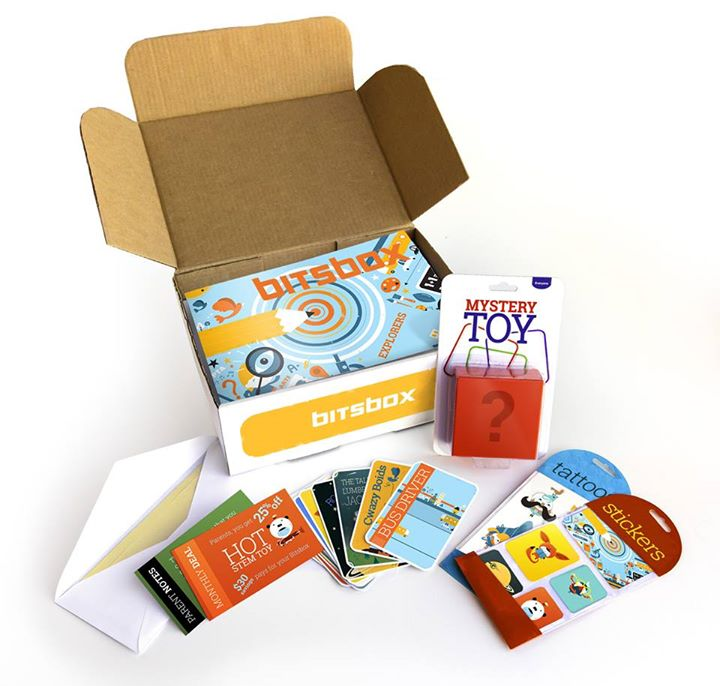
- Industry: Education Technology
- Founders: Scott Lininger, Aidan Chopra
- Headquarters: Boulder, Colorado, United States
- Services: Coding Education
- Website: Bitsbox.com

Bitsbox is a startup that teaches children how to code apps. The company sells boxes with suggested apps for users to code on a virtual tablet.

== Background ==
Scott Lininger and Aidan Chopra co-founded Bitsbox, which in 2014 participated in the Boomtown seed accelerator program. The accelerator acquired 6% equity in Bitsbox in exchange for $20,000 in seed funding.

In January 2015 Bitsbox raised $253,696 from 2,943 people in a Kickstarter campaign, and in April 2015 the company began sending out monthly subscription boxes with apps to code. In August 2015 Bitsbox closed a $500,000 funding round.

In June 2017, it was reported that Bitxbox was working with Colorado schools, and conducted its first pilot program with Saint Vrain Valley School District in Longmont, Colo., to study how the coding could be used in the classrooms.

== Reception ==
Forbes contributor Michael Lindenmayer wrote, "Bitsbox sets kids up for success" because, "children need to know how to code." Tamara Chuang of The Denver Post commented that Bitsbox, "[Is] helping to buck gender stereotypes for kids" since around half of its users are girls. CBS news anchor Kristine Johnson called Bitsbox, "a brilliant idea" and noted that the visuals are exciting for children.
