= Don Dahler =

American journalist and writer

Don Dahler (born 1960) is an American journalist and author. Dahler held various correspondent and anchor positions at three major networks: ABC, CBS, and FOX. Dahler is the author of four books.

== Career ==
According to his biography, Dahler's first reporting position was at WGHP-TV in High Point, North Carolina in 1982. He reported there for three years. He began as an unpaid intern for KENS-TV in San Antonio.

In 1997, Dahler was a correspondent for CNBC based out of Los Angeles. There, he filed reports on the sports and entertainment industries. Before CNBC and a brief stint at Fox News Channel as an investigative correspondent, Dahler was a producer for CBS news' 48 Hours. Prior to that, he made documentaries and wildlife films in Africa, Latin America, and Asia. During the 2001–02 television season, he was seen hosting Justice Files on the Discovery Channel.

Dahler joined CBS2 News on September 4, 2007, as weekend evening anchor. On May 27, 2008, the Daily News reported that the station had decided to give Don the co-anchorage for the 12 noon and 6:00 p.m. newscasts, which paired him with veteran Dana Tyler; all of this just five days after two-time alum Jim Rosenfield was let go for the sake of budget cuts. Steve Bartelstein, whom Dahler auditioned to replace at WABC-TV after Bartelstein was fired, replaced Dahler as Mary Calvi's weekend evening co-anchor.

On September 8, 2011, it was announced that Dahler would move to weekends, as Chris Wragge was returning to the local station from a 9-month stint as co-host of CBS' The Early Show.

Dahler joined ABC News in September 1999 as a National Correspondent for Good Morning America. Since then, he has filed reports for all programs at ABC, including Nightline, Primetime, 20/20 Downtown, Good Morning America and World News Tonight. He has travelled to Kosovo for war coverage and to Afghanistan and Iraq for the same reason. He was embedded with the 101st Airborne during the initial invasion, and has returned for three other embeds with U.S. troops.

In 2013, Dahler joined CBS News as a correspondent and left CBS in May 2020 to pursue writing full-time.

=== Major news story coverage ===
Dahler reported on many high-profile news stories within the U.S. and abroad such as the Columbine shootings in his native Colorado. On September 11, 2001, Dahler was the first network correspondent on the scene of the attack on the World Trade Center in New York City reporting live via telephone from his apartment—which was just blocks away from ground zero—a few moments after the first plane hit the towers. As he was one of the only reporters at ground zero when the planes hit, Dahler filed the first report of the South Tower's collapse mere seconds after it occurred. Two weeks later, he was one of the first American journalists travelling to Afghanistan before the U.S. began its bombing campaign against the Taliban. In 2002, prior to the Iraq War, Dahler and a team from Nightline, became the first journalists from the United States to successfully cross the Syrian border into northern Iraq prior to the Iraq War in more than a decade.

== Personal life ==
Dahler was born in Colorado Springs, Colorado to an Air Force family and grew up all over the United States. He attended MacArthur High School and San Antonio College. He graduated summa cum laude from the University of North Carolina at Charlotte.

Formerly married to NBC News' Sara James, Dahler currently resides in New Jersey with his wife Katie and their two children, Jack and Callie. Jack attends Duke University, and Callie attends Colgate University. He is the recipient of numerous awards, including two EMMYs, a Peabody, a Dupont, and two CINEs.

Dahler is the author of four books:

- Dahler, Don (2009). A Tight Lie. St. Martin's Press. ISBN 978-0-312-38350-3.
- Dahler, Don (March 2010). Water Hazard. St. Martin's Press. ISBN 978-0-312-38353-4.
- Dahler, Don (November 2017). Do A Little Wrong. CreateSpace Independent Publishing Platform. ISBN 978-1-5408-9493-9.

Daher's most recent book titled Fearless, which is a biography of pioneer aviator Harriet Quimby, was released in June 2022.
