= Michele Marsh (reporter) =

American journalist (1954–2017)

- Born: Michele Marie Marsh; March 9, 1954; Detroit, Michigan, U.S.
- Died: October 17, 2017 (aged 63); South Kent, Connecticut, U.S.
- Education: Northwestern University
- Occupation: Television journalist
- Years active: 1976–2003
- Notable credit(s): WCBS-TV; WNBC-TV
- Spouses: Nathaniel Price Paschall (divorced); Paul-Henri Nargeolet
- Children: 4

Michele Marie Marsh (March 9, 1954 – October 17, 2017) was an American broadcast journalist, best known for her work at two network-owned television stations in New York City from 1979 to 2003.

== Early life and career ==
Marsh grew up in suburban Detroit into a military family. Her parents were Howard Marsh, an insurance salesman, and the former Gloria Gadd. She had two brothers, Ronnie, who died at age 6 and John, who died at 21, who were both hemophiliacs, as was Marsh. She was partly raised in Philadelphia and in the San Diego area. She graduated from Grossmont High School in El Cajon, California, and later from Northwestern University, where she majored in what has been described as radio and television production or theater.

After her graduation from Northwestern in 1976, Marsh started her career as a reporter/anchor at WABI-TV, the CBS affiliate in Bangor, Maine. She reported in the field and anchored the 11 p.m. Monday-Friday newscasts, and the 6 p.m. Saturday newscast. She did much of the news gathering herself and ran the teleprompter with a foot pedal during broadcasts. Marsh was one of only three women at the time appearing on-camera on television news in Maine.

She then moved to San Antonio, Texas, where she worked at ABC affiliate KSAT-TV for about a year. In October 1978, she served as parade marshal for the Western Days Celebration in Yorktown, Texas.

== Career in New York ==
In August 1979, Marsh began working at WCBS-TV in New York City as a reporter and then as co-anchor of the Saturday night editions of Channel 2 News. Two months later in October, she was promoted to co-anchoring the 11:00 pm weeknight program alongside Rolland Smith. An article published in the New York Times shortly after her promotion described Marsh as part of a wave of anchorwomen in New York television news, along with Sue Simmons, Rose Ann Scamardella, Judy Licht and Pat Harper. At age 25, Marsh was the youngest of this group and was sometimes called "the baby of the newsroom" at her station.

In January 1981, Marsh was demoted from her anchor position to make way for her predecessor Dave Marash, who was rehired by WCBS-TV after a stint at ABC News. Upon learning of her demotion Marsh reportedly became distressed, causing the station to call in reporter John Tesh as an emergency standby in case Marsh was unable to work that evening.

After regaining this position in January 1982 she stayed as co-anchor of the late weeknight newscasts until 1993 and worked alongside Smith, Mike Schneider and Ernie Anastos; she was anchor of both of the station's 6:00 pm evening newscasts for several years with Jim Jensen, Anastos and John Johnson. Her on air image was sultry, glamorous and self-possessed. In June 1995, Marsh returned to anchoring the late newscast with Johnson, replacing Dana Tyler. Her salary by this time was close to $1 million per year.

Marsh was one of several personalities abruptly fired by WCBS-TV in October 1996 as part of a management-ordered shakeup of the station's news department due to declining ratings. Along with John Johnson, she was quickly hired by WNBC-TV to anchor a new midday newscast for the station. Upon joining WNBC, she also began co-anchoring the 6:00 pm newscast with Chuck Scarborough. In August 2003, WNBC removed Marsh from her anchor chair as the station intended to promote Lynda Baquero, thirteen years Marsh's junior, to work alongside Scarborough. The station discussed possible alternate positions, but came to no agreement with her. She left the station and ended her television career.

== Family ==
Marsh was married twice. With her first husband, Nathaniel Price Paschall, she had a son, John. After their divorce, she married the French oceanographer Paul-Henri Nargeolet.

== Death ==
Marsh died on October 17, 2017, from complications of breast cancer at the age of 63 at her home in South Kent, Connecticut.
