= Jessica Moore (journalist) =

American journalist (born 1982)

- Born: May 22, 1982 (age 44); Burlington, North Carolina, U.S.
- Education: Liberty University (B.S.)
- Occupation: Journalist
- Years active: 2004–present
- Employer(s): Kettering Medical Center (2004–2006); The Oakwood Register (2005–2007); LIN TV (2006–2007); Cordillera Communications (2007–2010); Intermountain West Communications Company (2010–2014); Sinclair Broadcast Group (2014–2016); CBS Television Stations (2016–present)
- Television: WDTN (2006–2007); WLEX-TV (2007–2010); KSNV (2010–2016); WCBS-TV (2016–present)
- Spouse(s): Jim Snyder (m. 2013; ann. 2013) Rehan Choudhry (m. 2017)
- Children: 2 (with Choudhry)

Jessica Carol Moore (born May 22, 1982) is an American journalist who currently works for WCBS-TV in New York City. She previously anchored the weekend evening newscasts until 2025. In July 2025, Moore began co-anchoring with Kristine Johnson at WCBS-TV in New York City on the 5 p.m. newscasts. Moore replaced Maurice DuBois on the weekday 5 p.m. show after he transitioned to national to co-anchor of the CBS Evening News in 2025. Moore acts as a weekday contributing reporter with a tight focus on political stories and hyperlocal tri-state area coverage.

== Awards and nominations ==
- 2010, won Ohio Valley Regional Emmy Award for WLEX-TV
- 2011, won KAPB Award for WLEX-TV
- 2013, won The Best of Silver State Awards for KSNV-DT (now KSNV) along with KVVU-TV Anchor and Reporter John Huck
- 2014, nominated 3 Pacific Southwest Regional Emmy Awards for KSNV-DT (now KSNV)
- 2015, nominated Pacific Southwest Regional Emmy Award for KSNV-DT (now KSNV)
- 2016, won Pacific Southwest Regional Emmy Award for KSNV
