= Dana Tyler =

American journalist (born 1958)

- Born: November 24, 1958 (age 67); Fort Lauderdale, Florida, U.S.
- Occupation: Journalist
- Notable credit: WCBS-TV anchor (1990–2024)
- Partner: Phil Collins (2006-2015)

Dana Tyler (born November 24, 1958) is a former news anchor and reporter at WCBS-TV in New York City, where she anchored the station's 6 p.m. newscast. In addition, Tyler hosted Eye on New York, a half-hour weekly community affairs program for WCBS, as well as several annual local specials: CBS 2 at the Tonys; CBS 2 at the Met; and Tunnel to Towers Run. Tyler first joined WCBS as a weekend anchor and reporter on July 16, 1990. On March 27, 2024, after 34 years with WCBS, Tyler signed off for the last time.

== Early life and education ==
Tyler was born in Fort Lauderdale, Florida and grew up in Worthington, Ohio, a suburb of Columbus. Her father, Waldo H. Tyler, was a pharmacist in Columbus, and generated notoriety in 1966 for ending the sale of cigarettes in his store. Her great-great-grandfather was James Seneca Tyler, the first black clerk of the Ohio House of Representatives. Her great-grandfather was Ralph Waldo Tyler, a society editor and political correspondent at The Columbus Dispatch and the first accredited African-American war correspondent to report on African-American soldiers stationed overseas during World War I.

She first appeared on television at the age of 8, appearing as a “clean plater” on a local show called Lucy’s Toy Shop where she was asked to eat a plateful of spinach and sing a jingle to a tree. She later attended Worthington High School and was a cheerleader.

== Career ==
Tyler began her journalism career as an intern at WBNS-TV in Columbus and was eventually promoted to the role of reporter in 1981. In 1987, the station acquired its first satellite truck and Tyler, along with co-host Dave Kaylor, launched a statewide show called Heart of Ohio. Tyler later won an Emmy for her work on the show and, by 1986, became a co-anchor of the station's evening newscasts. Tyler then moved to New York, and to WCBS-TV in June 1990 as weekend anchor and reporter. Along with Reggie Harris, she was part of the first African-American team in the New York market to anchor a newscast. She quickly moved up to the 5:00 p.m. and 11:00 p.m. newscasts in 1993. At WCBS-TV, Tyler has worked alongside some of the better-known television news anchors in New York City including Jim Jensen, Brian Williams, Ernie Anastos, John Johnson, Michele Marsh, Ira Joe Fisher, and Roz Abrams. She also worked with Stephen Clark, Don Dahler, Chris Wragge and Dick Brennan. Tyler remained in her post through a major staff reduction in November 1996 when several of the station's on-air personalities, including Marsh, Johnson, and Harris, were fired.

Tyler returned as the anchor on WCBS's 11 p.m. newscast, in addition to her 6 p.m. duties, both alongside Jim Rosenfield, on April 17, 2006 as part of a shakeup in anchors where no one stayed in their old capacity. She replaced veteran WABC-TV anchor Roz Abrams, who had replaced her a few years prior (Abrams moved to the noon and 5 p.m. newscasts, but is now no longer with the station) only to be replaced again in 2007 by Kristine Johnson. In July 2020, Tyler celebrated 30 years at WCBS-TV.

== Personal life ==
Tyler lives in Stamford, Connecticut. She met drummer Phil Collins during a press junket for the Broadway musical Tarzan, and was in a relationship with him from 2006 until 2015.

== Awards and honors ==
Tyler received The New York Association of Black Journalists Lifetime Achievement Award in 2014. She holds an honorary Doctor of Letters degree from St. John's University, and received the Alumni Award for Distinguished Service from Boston University. Tyler received two Emmy Awards in 2003 for coverage of a July 2003 shooting at New York's City Hall and for WCBS-TV's reporting on the August 2003 blackout.

== Other media appearances ==
In 2000, Tyler guest starred as herself on Everybody Loves Raymond in the episode "Robert's Rodeo," promoting an upcoming news story with video of a bull chasing a police officer–that officer being Robert Barone.

Tyler also had a cameo as a television reporter in Woody Allen's 2000 film Small Time Crooks.
