= Jim Jensen (reporter) =

American news anchor (1926–1999)

- Born: Harold Jens Jensen; November 13, 1926; Kenosha, Wisconsin, US
- Died: October 16, 1999 (aged 72); New York City, US
- Education: University of Denver (B.A.)
- Occupations: journalist, TV news anchor
- Known for: TV news anchor WCBS New York

Harold Jens Jensen (November 13, 1926 – October 16, 1999), usually known as Jim Jensen, was a longtime American anchor and reporter, most notably at CBS' flagship station, WCBS-TV in New York City.

== Background ==
Jensen, who was of Danish descent, was born in Kenosha, Wisconsin, and received a bachelor's degree in broadcast journalism from the University of Denver. then moved into broadcasting—first at WLIP-AM in Kenosha, then at WMBD-TV in Peoria, Illinois; and WBZ-AM-FM-TV in Boston.

== Career ==
In November 1963, he was the "pool" reporter in Hyannis Port at the Kennedy compound in the aftermath of John F. Kennedy's assassination. His reporting was noticed by WCBS, who hired him in 1964. He soon became weekend anchorman and backup weekday anchor behind Robert Trout, who was doing double duty at the station and at CBS News. Jensen didn't take too long to make an impact, winning notice for his coverage of Robert F. Kennedy's Senate campaign soon after he arrived in New York. When Trout left for a network assignment in Europe, Jensen succeeded him as WCBS' main anchor. He was the face of the WCBS newsroom for the next three decades.

Jensen was known in New York for his booming, gravelly voice and deliberate demeanor, and was often thought of as a local version of Walter Cronkite. WCBS had gone back and forth with WNBC-TV for first place, but under Jensen became the dominant station in New York, a lead it kept for most of the time until the mid-1980s. He was also known for asking perceptive questions, even of his colleagues at the news desk. WCBS' reporters had to know their stories very well if their stories aired when Jensen was behind the anchor desk. They risked embarrassing themselves on-air if Jensen asked them a question that they could not answer. Over the years, his partners at the anchor desk – some of them New York broadcast legends in their own right – included Ralph Penza, Rolland Smith, Carol Martin, Michele Marsh, Warner Wolf, and finally Dana Tyler. He was reportedly the model for Jim Dial, Murphy Brown's co-anchor.

In 1988, Jensen's on-air demeanor was brought into question over an incident involving fellow WCBS anchor Bree Walker. After Walker wrapped a report on early detection of birth defects in children, Jensen began asking Walker personal, probing questions about her own deformities, broaching the possibility that Walker's parents might have aborted her had they known about her condition in advance. Shortly after the incident, Jensen, who had a drug habit for many years, sought rehab for depression, alcohol, cocaine, and valium addiction. His depression was related to the loss of his son Randall, a Williams College and Fordham Law graduate, who died in a glider accident in Ellenville, New York, in 1979. He was back at WCBS within a short time and traveled to Israel to cover the Gulf War in 1991.

In 1994, WCBS demoted Jensen to host of its Sunday morning public-affairs show. At that time, he had been WCBS' lead anchor for 29 years—longer than anyone in New York television history (a record surpassed by WNBC anchor Chuck Scarborough in 2004). The station's ratings had declined considerably, and management wanted new blood at the anchor desk. However, the decision and the manner in which the situation was handled caused a firestorm of criticism. The criticism increased when Jensen was forced to retire, in 1995, shortly after Westinghouse announced it was buying CBS. WCBS' ratings plummeted even further, and by the end of 1995 it had sunk into last place and remained there for more than a decade before recovering.

== Death ==
Jensen died at Lenox Hill Hospital in Manhattan on October 16, 1999, of a heart attack at age 72. Jensen was survived by his second wife, Rachel Gordon Jensen, three daughters, and a son.
