= Arnold Diaz =

American journalist (1949–2023)

- Born: Arnold Theodore Diaz; June 16, 1949; Brooklyn, New York, U.S.
- Died: October 24, 2023 (aged 74); Greenwich, Connecticut, U.S.
- Occupation: News reporter
- Spouse: Shawn Callaghan-Diaz
- Children: 3

Arnold Theodore Diaz (June 16, 1949 – October 24, 2023) was an American television consumer watchdog journalist, last employed by WPIX-TV in New York. Diaz was known for his Shame on You series of consumer reports which aired on WCBS-TV for over twenty years. Diaz also worked for ABC News and WNYW in similar capacities, with the latter taking a page from WCBS and naming the segment Shame Shame Shame. He focused most of his reports on exposing wrongdoing and incompetence by private industry and government agencies. His reports have led to jail time for a number of scam artists.

== Education ==
Diaz obtained his degree from Florida State University, where he was a Phi Beta Kappa. He later received his master's degree in journalism from the Medill School of Journalism at Northwestern University in Chicago.

== Career ==
Diaz first reported for WPLG-TV in Miami from the early to mid-1970s, then moved to WCBS-TV in New York, where he served from the mid-1970s to the early 1990s. During his time at WCBS, Diaz won 25 local Emmy Awards. He won a total of 48 Emmy awards in the course of his career. Diaz later worked for ABC's 20/20 as the show's Consumer Investigative Reporter from 1995 to 2003. During his time with 20/20, he won the National Press Club Consumer Journalism Award and the Consumer Federation of America Media Service Award. He returned to WCBS in 2003 and revived the Shame On You segment, lasting there until moving to WNYW in 2006, where Diaz's segment continued under the new title of Shame, Shame, Shame. In 1995, Diaz was inducted into the National Academy of Arts and Sciences Silver Circle. In January 2014, it was announced Diaz would no longer be working for WNYW-TV. On March 31, 2014; Diaz joined WPIX as part of the newly-formed "PIX11 Investigates" unit with longtime reporters Mary Murphy and chief investigator Howard Thompson. Diaz retired from WPIX on March 29, 2022.

== Personal life and death ==
Arnold Diaz lived in Port Chester, New York, with his wife and three children.

Diaz died from multiple myeloma in Greenwich, Connecticut, on October 24, 2023, at the age of 74.
