= Rolland Smith =

American news anchor

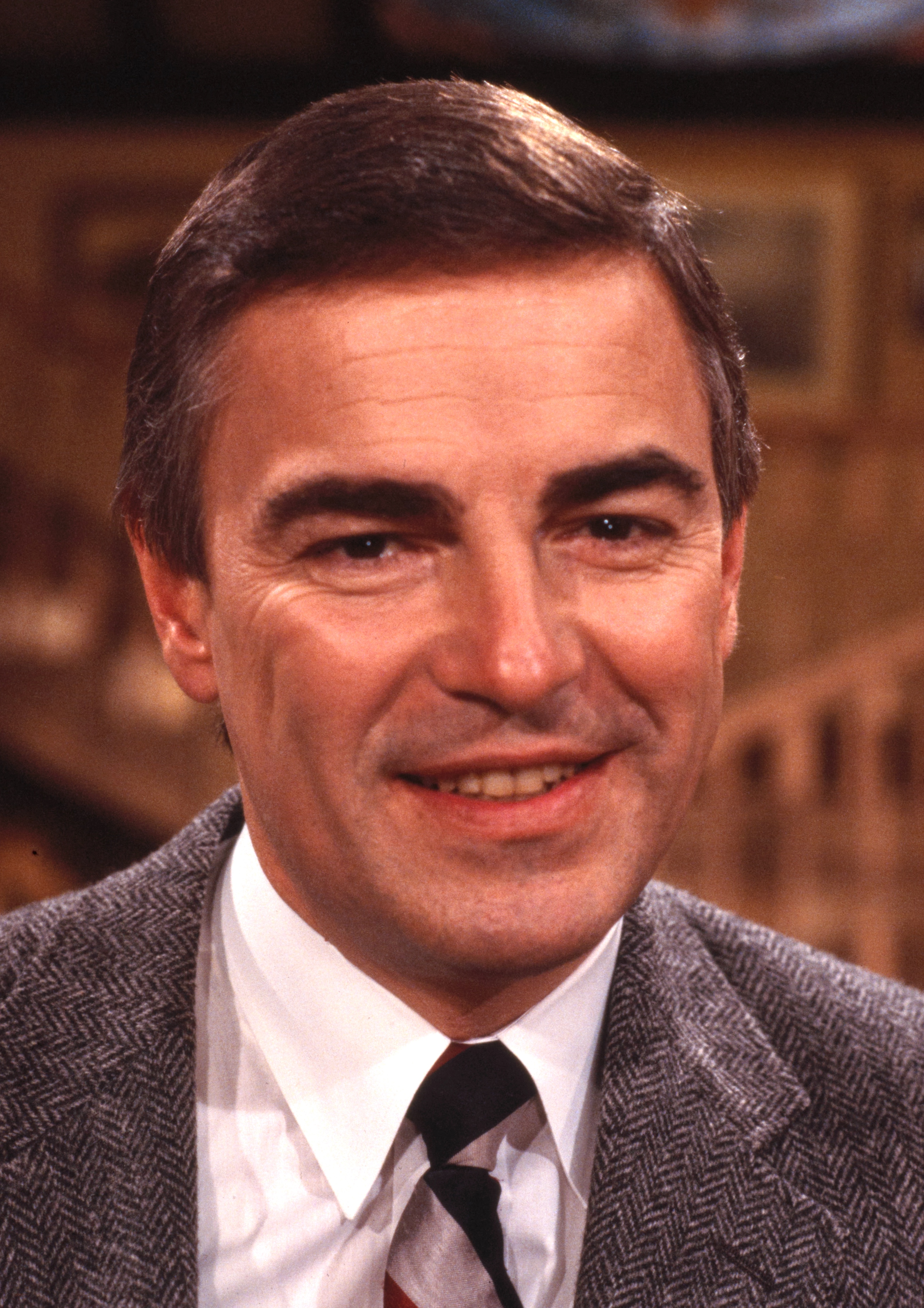
Smith in 1987

Rolland G. Smith (born December 6, 1941) is an American retired television news reporter and anchor who was based in New York City for most of his long career.

== Broadcasting career ==
Smith began his broadcasting career in 1957 at WONG radio in Oneida, New York while still in High School. He worked for WHCU radio While attending Ithaca College. In 1963 he was News Director for WFBL radio in Syracuse, NY and also worked in this first television job at WNYS-TV also in Syracuse. Smith's earliest news broadcasting job was at WANE-TV Fort Wayne and then transferred to WISH-TV in Indianapolis co-anchoring the news with Mike Ahern beginning in 1967. He covered the Vietnam War in 1968 for WISH-TV and WANE-TV Corinthian Broadcasting Group. After two years he moved on to Metromedia Television, where he served as White House correspondent for Metromedia Television Group in Washington, D.C.. Metromedia would later transfer him to New York, where he would become co-anchor of WNEW-TV's Ten O'Clock News. Smith departed Metromedia for CBS in 1970, and instantly became a reporter and anchor for WCBS-TV. In 1973 Smith was named co-anchor of WCBS' evening newscasts, a position he held for 13 years. His 11 p.m. co-anchors included Dave Marash (1973–1978 and 1981–1982) and Vic Miles (1978–1979), before Michele Marsh joined him for the balance of his run with channel 2. Starting in late 1975, he was teamed with Jim Jensen on the 6 p.m. newscast, a partnership that remained until Smith's departure from the station in August of 1986.

Shortly after he left WCBS-TV, he was named co-host of CBS' The Morning Program, which premiered on January 12, 1987. Smith left CBS that December after the show was canceled. Following this he moved to WWOR, and in early 1988 he became the lead anchor of the station's 10 PM newscast replacing Tom Dunn. Smith would leave WWOR in 1993 and moved from New York for the first time since his transfer from Washington, as he relocated to San Diego to take an anchor position at NBC affiliate KNSD. This was the first time Smith had worked for a network-affiliated station since his 1986 departure from WCBS (WWOR, at the time, was an independent and was a year away from gaining any affiliation). He stayed with KNSD until 1997 and returned to New York for a brief two-year stint at WRNN, where he anchored three evening news shows and hosted an interview show called Conversations), Smith rejoined WWOR as lead anchor following Ernie Anastos' departure to return to WCBS. He eventually moved to weekends as the co-anchor of the station's now-former Saturday and Sunday newscasts. In addition to his anchor duties, on each newscast he provided a small commentary that would be accompanied by his signature superimposed on screen. Smith announced his retirement in 2006, after earning 11 Emmy Awards.

== Outside of news ==
In addition to his news career, Smith is a published poet with several books and CDs of his writings in print. As a part of WWOR during its time being owned by MCA, he made a cameo appearance in the now-extinct King Kong Encounter at Universal Studios Hollywood.

== Personal life ==
Smith married artist Sue DiCicco in 2021.

== "Fighting the frizzies, at 11" ==
The obscure-in-origin catchphrase "Fighting the frizzies, at 11", known to both Star Wars and South Park fans, traces its origins to Smith. The Star Wars Holiday Special is commercially unavailable except for bootleg copies of home VHS and Betamax recordings of the show's one-time airing. Among the most widely circulated recordings is one made from the broadcast on WCBS-TV.

During the WCBS broadcast, a young mustachioed Smith appears during a number of commercial breaks in a "teaser" for the upcoming 11 PM newscast, where he simply says "Fighting the frizzies, at 11," probably in reference to a story on hair care. The creators of South Park, Matt Stone and Trey Parker, incorporated scenes of South Park editor Tom Vogt dressed as a news anchor resembling Smith in a South Park holiday episode. The episode opened with the line being deadpanned by Vogt, and each segment of the show began with the line (or some variation of it). The episode ended with the anchor putting on boxing gloves and literally fighting the "frizzies", anthropomorphized as a large monster made of frizzy hair.
