= Paul-Henri Nargeolet =

French naval officer and explorer (1946–2023)

- Born: 2 March 1946; Chamonix-Mont-Blanc, Haute-Savoie, France
- Died: 18 June 2023 (aged 77); North Atlantic Ocean
- Cause of death: Implosion of Titan submersible
- Spouses: Michele Marsh (died 2017); Anne Sarraz-Bournet
- Military career
- Allegiance: France
- Branch: French Navy
- Service years: 1964–1986
- Rank: Frigate captain

Signature
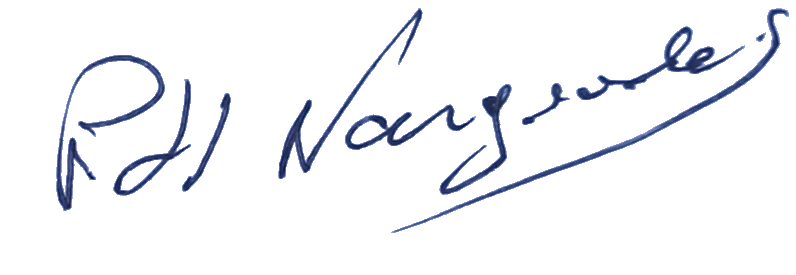

Paul-Henri Nargeolet (French pronunciation: [pɔl ɑ̃ʁi naʁʒɔlɛ]; 2 March 1946 – 18 June 2023) was a French deep sea explorer and Titanic expert. Known as "Mr. Titanic", Nargeolet was one of five people who died aboard the submersible Titan when it imploded on 18 June 2023 near the wreck of the Titanic.

== Early life ==
Nargeolet was born on 2 March 1946 in Chamonix in the French department of Haute-Savoie. He lived in Casablanca, Morocco, for 13 years before relocating to Paris to complete his studies at the age of 16.

== Career ==
=== French Navy ===
Nargeolet began his career in the French Navy, where he served as an officer specialising in mine clearance, diving, and deep underwater intervention from 1964 to 1986. During the 1970s, he was appointed Commander of the Groupement de Plongeurs Démineurs de Cherbourg, whose mission was to find and neutralise underwater mines. During the 1980s, he was transferred to the Undersea Intervention Group (French: Groupe d'Intervention sous la Mer: GISMER), where he piloted intervention submarines.

During that time he travelled the world retrieving submerged French airplanes and helicopters, including the individuals and weapons in them. By this work he found a Roman wreck, located at a depth of 70 metres. He also located a DHC-5 Buffalo airplane that crashed in 1979 with 12 people aboard, including several members of the Mauritanian government. Nargeolet retired at the rank of capitaine de frégate (frigate captain).

=== IFREMER ===
In 1986, the French Research Institute for the Exploitation of the Sea (IFREMER) contacted Nargeolet about diving to the wreck of the Titanic; he heartily agreed to go. With IFREMER, Nargeolet piloted dives to the Titanic wreck site in 1987, 1993, 1994, and 1996. His 1987 expedition was the first to collect artefacts from the wreckage.

As part of his IFREMER missions, Nargeolet located various aircraft damaged at sea. On 15 May 1993, Nargeolet made a dive with the Nautile and discovered, by chance, La Lune, which sank in 1664 near Toulon.

=== Center for Maritime & Underwater Resource Management ===
Beginning in 1994, Nargeolet was director of Michigan State University's Center for Maritime & Underwater Resource Management (CMURM).

=== Aqua+ ===
From 1996 to 2003, Nargeolet worked with Aqua+, a subsidiary of Canal+, whose objective is to produce underwater films. During his time with the company he directed the underwater missions of two submarines.

=== Premier Exhibitions, Inc. ===
In August 2007 RMS Titanic, Inc., a company owned by Premier Exhibitions which organizes travelling exhibitions, commissioned Nargeolet to locate RMS Carpathia, which had rescued survivors of RMS Titanic but was torpedoed in 1918.

Nargeolet worked with RMS Titanic to recover artefacts related to the Titanic as the director of the Underwater Research Program. His work has included utilizing remotely operated vehicles (ROV), as well as piloting dives to the wreck site. His work has resulted in recovering nearly 6,000 artefacts over the course of 35 dives. In 2010, he was part of a mission to 3D map the wreck site and determine levels of deterioration using ROVs and autonomous underwater robots.

Also in 2010, he was involved with the search for the flight recorder of Air France Flight 447, which crashed the previous year while en route from Rio de Janeiro to Paris.

=== Other ===
As an expert on the Titanic, Nargeolet participated as a creator of two documentaries: Titanic: The Legend Lives On (1994) and Deep Inside the Titanic (1999). In 2022, he published Dans les profondeurs du Titanic (lit. 'In the Depths of the Titanic'), which recounts his expeditions.

== Personal life ==
Nargeolet had two daughters, a son, a stepson, and four grandsons. His wife Michele Marsh, an American television reporter, died in 2017.

Later, as a result of his Titanic work, Nargeolet re-established contact with a childhood friend, Anne Sarraz-Bournet, who became his second wife.

At the time of his death, Nargeolet lived in Pawling in New York, having moved there in 2022. He became a U.S. citizen in February 2016.

=== Titan expedition and death ===
If you are 11 metres or 11 kilometres down, if something bad happens, the result is the same. When you're in very deep water, you're dead before you realize that something is happening, so it's just not a problem.

— Nargeolet, 2019

On 18 June 2023, Nargeolet was onboard the Titan, a submersible owned, designed, built and operated by OceanGate on an expedition to view the Titanic wreckage. The vehicle lost contact with the above-water ship, MV Polar Prince. Search-and-rescue missions involved water and air support from the United States, Canada and France. Over $6.5 million was spent on rescue efforts.

On 22 June, after the discovery of a debris field approximately 490 metres (1,600 ft) from the bow of the Titanic, OceanGate said it believed Nargeolet and the four others aboard "have sadly been lost". A United States Coast Guard press conference later confirmed that the debris was consistent with a catastrophic loss of the pressure hull, resulting in the implosion of the submersible vehicle.

== See also ==
- List of solved missing person cases (2020s)

== Works ==
- Dans les profondeurs du Titanic. HarperCollins, Paris 2022, ISBN 979-1-03-390984-2 (in French)
- The Secrets of the Titanic. One More Chapter, London 2023, ISBN 978-0-00-869408-1 (trans. Laura Haydon). Originally published in French by HarperCollins (2022).
