= Maurice DuBois =

American television anchorman (born 1965)

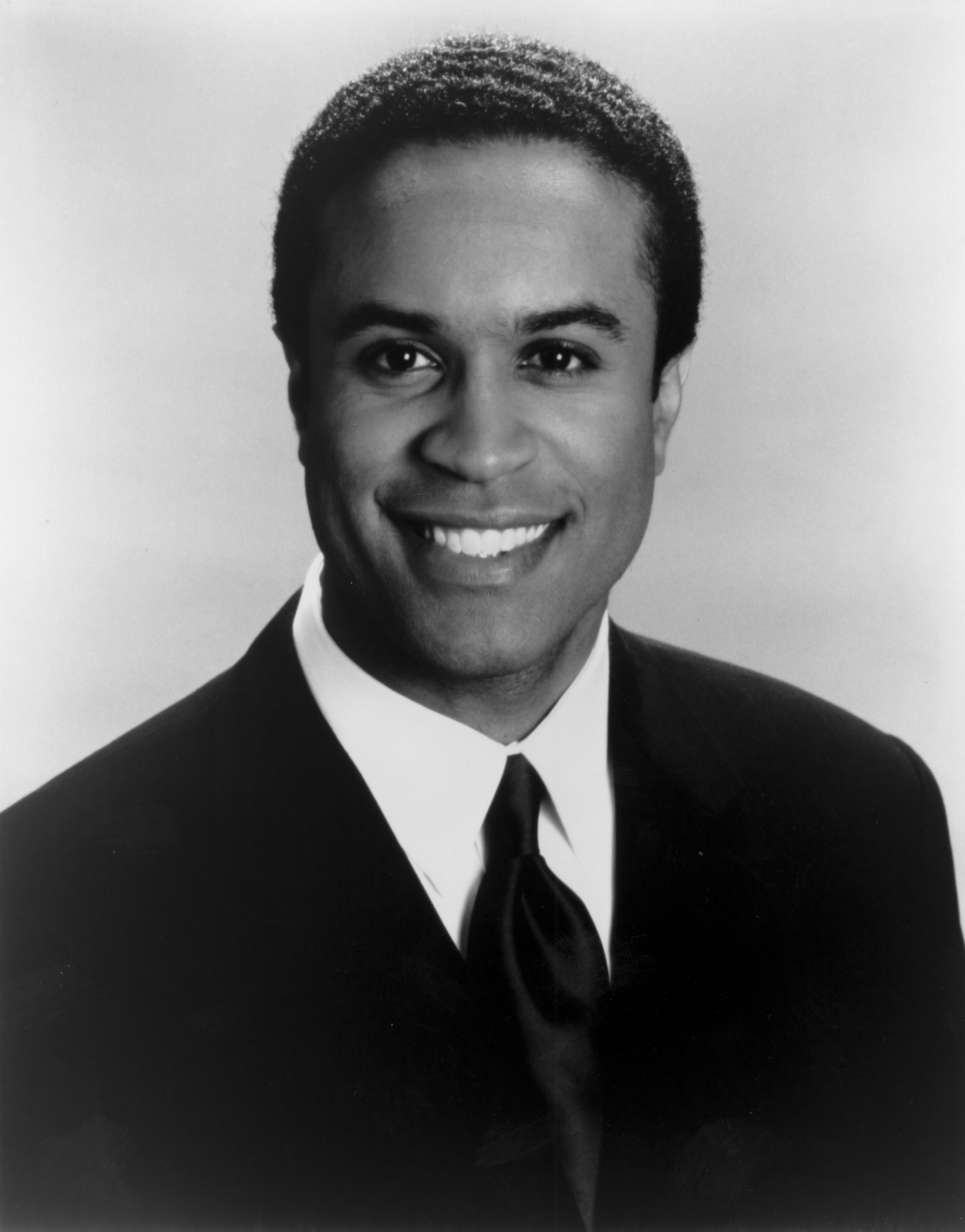
- DuBois in 2003
- Born: August 20, 1965 (age 60); Long Island, New York, U.S.
- Education: Northwestern University
- Occupation: Journalist
- Spouse: Andrea Adair (m. 2001)
- Children: 2

Maurice DuBois (born August 20, 1965) is an American television anchorman who was the co-anchor of the CBS Evening News with John Dickerson. Previously, he anchored various newscasts for WCBS-TV in New York City on the 5 p.m. and 11 p.m. newscasts, the flagship station of CBS in New York City with Kristine Johnson.

== Early life and education ==
DuBois was born on Long Island, New York, the son of immigrants to the U.S. from Dominica, an island nation in the Caribbean. He attended Port Jefferson High School, and received a Bachelor of Science degree in journalism from the Medill School of Journalism at Northwestern University in Evanston, Illinois. While in college, he served as an intern at the Public Affairs Office of the Brookhaven National Laboratory on Long Island in 1984 and 1985, where he wrote for the employee newspaper, the Brookhaven Bulletin.

== Career ==
DuBois began his career in 1987, when he worked as a desk assistant at KING-TV in Seattle, Washington. Following that, he served as an anchor and reporter at WFLD-TV in Chicago, Illinois, and later at KCRA-TV in Sacramento, California. He then spent seven years in New York at WNBC-TV, the East Coast flagship station of the NBC television network. While at WNBC, DuBois served as a co-anchor of Today in New York, an early-morning local news and entertainment program. During that time, he also hosted Four Stories – a television news-magazine program featuring community heroes – as well as Mind Over Media, special programming for Court-TV for students to understand media images.

In addition, DuBois worked as a substitute news reader on NBC News's Today and as a substitute co-host and news reader on its weekend editions.

In September 2004, DuBois joined WCBS-TV – also in New York and the East Coast flagship station of the CBS television network – as one of its anchors for the 6pm newscast, CBS 2 News at 6 with Dana Tyler. He then co-anchored CBS 2 News This Morning and CBS 2 News at Noon with Cindy Hsu and also with Mary Calvi.

In January 2011, DuBois began co-anchoring – with Kristine Johnson – CBS 2 News at 5 and CBS 2 News at 11. He was also an occasional substitute anchor on the weekend edition of the CBS Evening News.

In addition to covering local news, DuBois has worked as a reporter, covering national political conventions, AIDS in South Africa, witnessing a double execution – an experience which DuBois described as "intense", the death of Pope John Paul II and the installation of Pope Benedict XVI.

Maurice often gets a shoutout and mentions on Desus & Mero as they are fans and has had cameos on the show.

On August 1, 2024, CBS named DuBois and John Dickerson as the new anchors of the CBS Evening News, replacing Norah O'Donnell. He left WCBS-TV in January 2025 to focus on the national broadcast. In December 2025, DuBois left the CBS Evening News.

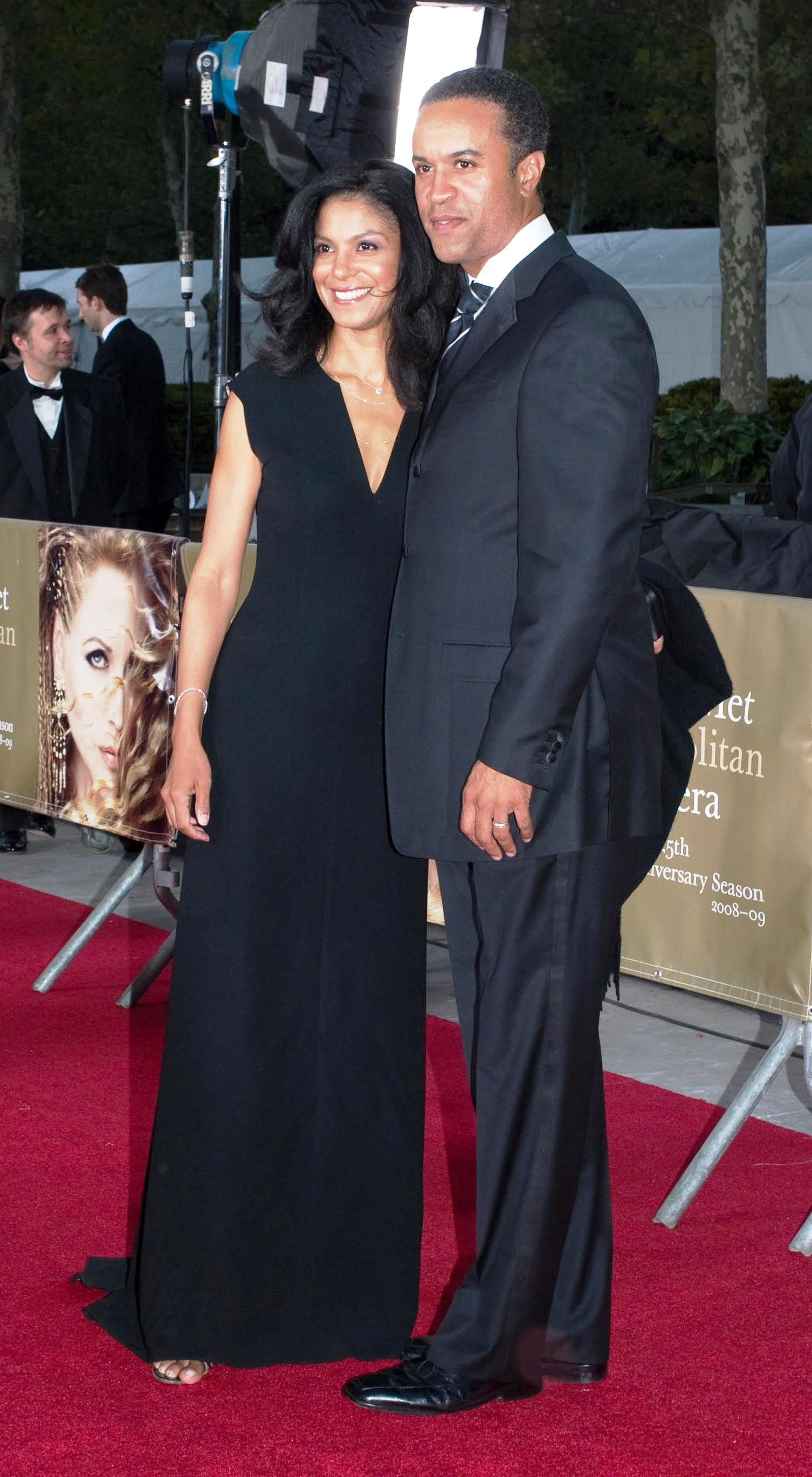
DuBois with his wife Andrea at the Metropolitan Opera opening night in 2008

== Community service ==
DuBois is involved in various community organizations including serving on three non-profit boards – Pencil; Susan G. Komen for the Cure (New York City affiliate); and New York City Center. He has worked with WNET's GED program.

== Personal life ==
DuBois and his wife, Andrea Adair, were married on August 13, 2001. They have two sons and live in Harlem.

== Awards and honors ==
DuBois has won four Emmy Awards and has been honored by the Associated Press. He also received a Trailblazer Award from the New York City chapter of the National Association of Black Journalists.

DuBois has received honorary Doctor of Philosophy degrees from Briarcliffe College in Bethpage, New York; Medgar Evers College (of the City University of New York) in Brooklyn, New York; Seton Hall University in South Orange, New Jersey and St. Francis College in Brooklyn, New York.

Media offices
| Preceded by Norah O'Donnell | CBS Evening News Weekday Edition Co-anchor; January 27, 2025 – December 18, 2025; Served alongside: John Dickerson | Succeeded by Tony Dokoupil |
