= Jim Snyder (journalist) =

American journalist (born 1964)

- Born: October 17, 1965 (age 60); Chicago, Illinois, U.S.
- Education: Edward R. Murrow College of Communication (B.A.)
- Occupation: Journalist
- Years active: 1987–present
- Employer(s): Intermountain West Communications Company (1991–1994 and 1998–2014); Fisher Communications (1994–1998); Sinclair Broadcast Group (2014–present)
- Television: KAYU-TV and KCWT (1987); KNDO and KNDU (1987–1989); Unknown (1989–1991); KSNV (1991–1994 and 1998–present); KOMO-TV (1994–1998)
- Political party: Democratic (1998–2018); Independent (2018–present)
- Spouses: Lori Heeren (divorced); Adeana Shendal (divorced); Jessica Moore (m. 2013; ann. 2013) Abbie Green Friedman (m. 2018; div. 2021)
- Children: 1 (with Heeren)

James Eugene Snyder (born October 17, 1965) is an American journalist. He is a former member of the Democratic Party.

== Awards and nominations ==
- 2009, won Pacific Southwest Regional Emmy Award for KVBC (now KSNV)
- 2014, nominated Pacific Southwest Regional Emmy Award for KSNV-DT (now KSNV)
