= John Bolaris =

American television meteorologist and realtor

- Born: John Bolaris; June 27, 1957 (age 69); Long Island, New York, U.S.
- Education: Suffolk County Community College (AAS)
- Occupations: Television Meteorologist; Realtor
- Height: 5 ft 6 in (1.68 m)
- Children: 1
- Military career
- Allegiance: United States
- Branch: Air National Guard

John Bolaris (born June 27, 1957) is an American television meteorologist and Realtor. He has worked as the Chief Meteorologist for Weekend Today, NBC 10, WCBS and Fox 29. Bolaris currently works as the President of BlackLabel Luxury Real Estate in Philadelphia, Pennsylvania. Bolaris is a four time Emmy Award winner.

== Early life ==
Bolaris was born on Long Island and was avid about meteorology from a young age. His father was a truck driver who immigrated from Greece and his mother was a housewife. He went on to graduate from Connetquot High School in 1975 and Suffolk County Community College in 1980. After getting an associate degree, Bolaris enlisted in the U.S. Air Force. He attended their Weather Technical School and served three years in the Air National Guard where he advised pilots on weather conditions. He is of Jewish and Irish descent.

== Career ==
=== Meteorology ===
Bolaris started his career as a meteorologist at Metro Weather Service in 1982. Five years later, he became a television meteorologist for News 12 Long Island. After a week at News 12 Long Island, Bolaris was named the weekend television meteorologist for WCBS. While at WCBS, Bolaris served as a forecaster on the weather for the New York Yankees and their owner, George Steinbrenner. Bolaris served as a reporter on the CBS Evening News with Dan Rather during Hurricane Hugo.

In 1990, Bolaris was relocated to Philadelphia by CBS executives, who wanted to revitalize then-CBS-affiliated WCAU-TV.

In 2001, Bolaris drew major criticism after predicting a major blizzard, which he dubbed the "storm of the century" would hit Philadelphia. Leading up to the storm, Bolaris' segments featured custom theme music and he often compared the emerging storm to the North American blizzard of 1996. Bolaris urged viewers to stay home from work and Philadelphia area schools were closed. However, the storm resulted in less than an inch of snow. As a result, Bolaris received more than 1,000 angry emails and multiple death threats. A year later, Bolaris left Philadelphia and returned to WCBS where he worked for six years as a meteorologist.

In 2009, Bolaris returned to Philadelphia as the Chief Meteorologist at Fox 29. However, Bolaris ran into trouble with Fox 29's management after they refused to conduct an interview with Bolaris' friend and former Phillies star, Lenny Dykstra. In December 2011, Bolaris was suspended after he took part in a profile in Playboy magazine, which presented him in a negative light and he was fired a month later.

Following his departure at Fox 29, Bolaris served as a weather columnist at The Philadelphia Inquirer and launched a weather website known as Weather Savior. The website was shut down after a little over a year. In 2012, he appeared on The Howard Stern Show to discuss Hurricane Sandy.

=== Real estate ===
In 2016, John Bolaris retired from meteorology and co-founded BlackLabel Luxury Real Estate. As a Realtor, he specializes in selling homes to celebrities, athletes and CEOs. He served as the listing agent for an estate on Long Island where F. Scott Fitzgerald reportedly wrote The Great Gatsby.

Bolaris' high-profile clients include Joel Embiid and Michael Raffl.

== Personal life ==
Bolaris has one daughter, Reina, whom he had with Tiffany McElroy, a former reporter. Bolaris is known in the Philadelphia media for being a "ladies man," who had been publicly accused of sexual assault. He has been in relationships with Lauren Hart, Jane Robelot and Nicole Miller.

In 2010, while in Miami, Bolaris was drugged and charged for $43,000 on his American Express card. Bolaris contacted the FBI, who connected Bolaris' story to a crime ring run by a bar owner. Seventeen arrests were made in connection with the crime ring. The story was the subject of investigations on ABC's 20/20 and American Greed.
