= Kristine Johnson =

News anchor (born 1972)

- Born: June 5, 1972 (age 54); Angeles City, Philippines
- Occupation: News presenter
- Spouse: Steve Poulin
- Children: 2
- Website: www.cbsnews.com/newyork/personality/kristine-johnson/

Kristine Johnson (born June 5, 1972) is an American news presenter. She is the lead anchor at WCBS-TV in New York City on the 5 p.m. 6 p.m. and 11 p.m. newscasts.

== Early life and education ==
Johnson was born on Clark Air Base in Angeles City, Philippines, the daughter of Africa Dizon of Filipino descent and Erik Johnson, a U.S. military meteorologist of Swedish American descent. Her mother was previously married with four children all of which were adopted by her father. The family moved to the United States. She also has a younger brother. She attended high school in Texas and graduated from the University of Nebraska–Lincoln with a Bachelor of Arts in journalism and minors in political science, history and English.

== Career ==
Johnson started her career as a reporter and anchor in Providence, Rhode Island for WPRI. She joined NBC in 2005, working as an anchor of NBC's Early Today and First Look on MSNBC. She was also one of the alternating news anchors on NBC's Weekend Today. She announced on Early Today that October 20, 2006, was her last day and that she would be moving on. That was the same week that NBC Universal announced that it would cut 700 jobs.

She joined WCBS-TV in November 2006 as co-anchor of the noon and 5 p.m. newscasts alongside Chris Wragge, the station's former sports director. In June 2007, she and Wragge replaced Dana Tyler and Jim Rosenfield on the 11 p.m. newscast, with Tyler and Rosenfield taking the noon newscast. She partnered with Maurice DuBois on the 5 and 11 p.m. news from 2011 until DuBois was promoted to co-anchor of the CBS Evening News in 2025. He left WCBS-TV in January 2025 to focus on the national broadcast. In July 2025 Johnson partnered with Jessica Moore news on the 5pm news and solo on the 6 and 11 p.m. news. Johnson anchored the news during Hurricane Sandy, the blizzard of 2013, the Sandy Hook Elementary School shooting, and Boston Marathon bombing. In September 2022, Johnson traveled to London to cover preparations for the funeral of Elizabeth II.

She is the recipient of two nominations for an Emmy award as a producer.

== Personal life ==
Johnson resides in Upper Saddle River, New Jersey, with her husband Steve, daughter Ava (born May 2002), and son Burke (born March 2007).

Johnson has run and completed three New York City Marathons in 2014, 2015, and 2021.

== See also ==
- Filipinos in the New York City metropolitan region
