= Jack Cafferty =

American journalist

- Born: December 14, 1942 (age 83); Chicago, Illinois, U.S.
- Occupation: Commentator
- Notable credit: CNN's Situation Room
- Spouse: Carol Cafferty (died 2008)
- Children: 4

Jack Cafferty (born December 14, 1942) is a former CNN commentator and occasional host of specials. In the summer of 2005, Cafferty joined The Situation Room. He left CNN after November 15, 2012.

== Career ==
Cafferty started his career in Reno, Nevada in 1961, as a children's show host at KOLO-TV. He later moved to KCRL-TV, where he served as the station's production manager, and followed that with daytime talk show Cafferty & Company on WDAF-TV in Kansas City, Missouri. In 1974, he became the weeknight co-anchor, and later news director, at WHO-TV in Des Moines, Iowa.

In 1977, Cafferty moved to WNBC-TV in New York City as a weekend, then evening co-anchor on the station's 6:00 p.m. news hour. In 1979, Cafferty became co-anchor of WNBC-TV's 5:00 p.m weeknight newscast, and the following year he was joined on the program by Sue Simmons. In 1979, he became an owner of the Unterrified Democrat, a Missouri newspaper; he sold his share of the paper in 1980. Their show was reformatted as Live at Five, and its mix of news, features and celebrity interviews would prove successful for much of the 1980s. Cafferty left WNBC-TV around Thanksgiving 1989 due to a contract dispute and at Christmas, he joined rival WNYW, where he anchored the Fox flagship station's 7:00 p.m. news and a short-lived late night show, Newsline New York. In 1992, Cafferty moved to then-independent station WPIX, and co-anchored its 10:00 p.m. newscast until joining CNNfn in 1998.

In the summer of 2005, Cafferty joined The Situation Room, CNN's weekday afternoon newscast. Cafferty also formerly co-anchored CNN's weekday morning broadcast, American Morning. On The Cafferty File, his nightly segment on The Situation Room, he offers commentary and personal opinions.

In October 2006, Cafferty hosted a five-part miniseries on CNN titled Broken Government detailing problems with the two political parties, government bureaucracy and the federal court system. Viewer e-mail messages replaced the news crawl that usually appears on the bottom of the screen.

Cafferty has earned many distinctions in his career, including the Edward R. Murrow Award, an Emmy award and the New York Associated Press State Broadcasters Award.

== Books ==
Cafferty is the author of the book It's Getting Ugly Out There: The Frauds, Bunglers, Liars, and Losers Who Are Hurting America, published on September 10, 2007 by John Wiley & Sons. The book is a satirical critique of political and social issues, including the long arm of big business, the Iraq War and Hurricane Katrina, expanding on many of themes covered on Cafferty's Situation Room segment and chastising the growing culture of sensationalism and tabloid journalism in modern news media.

Portions of the book are autobiographical, describing Cafferty's childhood and short-lived military career as well as his foray into journalism. According to Cafferty: "Very little of my back story qualifies as Hallmark Card material, but it may help you to make sense of the way I see and interpret what's going on around me."

Cafferty's second book, entitled Now or Never: Getting Down to the Business of Saving Our American Dream was published by Wiley on March 9, 2009.

== Political positions ==
=== Bush administration ===
Cafferty initially supported the 2003 invasion of Iraq. He says he "bought the whole song and dance about WMDs. I was caught up in the national hysteria that followed 9/11, and was captive to the political manipulation, if you will, that took place in all of us." He revised his position when the Downing Street memo was leaked in 2005 and became a harsh critic of the administration.

On the Iraq War, Cafferty stated, "The Bush administration used 9/11 as an excuse to start the war in Iraq. People make a lot of money during wartime – $600 billion we've spent there so far – and a lot of that money has gone to friends of the administration, and of course there is all that oil. I don't think for a single second there was anything honorable about the decision to invade a sovereign country. They had nothing to do with 9/11 and had done nothing to the United States. But hey... what do I know?"

On February 15, 2006, when Fox News Channel commentator Brit Hume interviewed Vice-President Dick Cheney after he had shot Harry Whittington in a hunting accident, Cafferty remarked, "I would guess it didn't exactly represent a profile in courage for the vice-president to wander over there to the F-word network for a sitdown with Brit Hume. I mean, that's a little like Bonnie interviewing Clyde, ain't it?" As this is a common euphemism used at CNN to refer to Rupert Murdoch's network, Cafferty later clarified: "Get your mind out of the gutter. The F-word is Fox."

Cafferty was reprimanded by the president of CNN when he called Donald Rumsfeld "an obnoxious jerk and war criminal" on the eve of the 2006 midterm election. He made an on-air acknowledgment of having "stepped over the line", but later told the interviewer, "I will go to my grave as Jack Cafferty, private citizen, believing that these people committed war crimes."

On August 19, 2008, he wrote an article comparing John McCain to George W. Bush, concluding that "I fear to the depth of my being that John McCain is just like him."

=== U.S. Democratic Party ===
Cafferty repeatedly accused the Democratic Party of failing to honor their campaign promises to end the Iraq War: "The Democrats were handed a golden opportunity to challenge President Bush on the war when they were given control of Congress in the midterm elections in 2006. So far they have done absolutely nothing." Cafferty once stated that "It seems the Democrats are the greatest thing the Republicans have going for them sometimes." When House Speaker Nancy Pelosi said that Republicans were using filibuster tactics to block measures to withdraw American troops from Iraq, Cafferty declared: "Baloney, Madam Speaker. Appropriations bills for the war must pass the House of Representatives by a simple majority. It is completely within your power to stop the funding of the war in Iraq. You have simply chosen not to do so. In fact, I did a little homework. The Speaker of the House of Representatives decides which pieces of legislation even come to the floor of the House debate and/or a vote."

== Controversial remarks ==
Cafferty's outspoken and provocative style of commentary has on occasion led to public outcry. Though he acknowledges his habit of "saying some pretty outrageous stuff", Cafferty has characterized this as part of his job description: "I get paid to ask questions I don't know the answers to and to complain about the things that bother me."

=== Air America Radio ===
During Cafferty's time as a co-anchor of CNN's morning program, he reported on March 31, 2004 that "It's a red-letter day here in America. Air America, that communist radio network, starts broadcasting in a little while." Cafferty was unyielding when CNN colleague Soledad O'Brien responded by saying that the new talk-radio network was not communist but liberal. He replied: "Well. Aren't they synonymous?"

=== Middle East ===
The American-Arab Anti-Discrimination Committee has accused Cafferty of having a "simplistic" view of the Middle East. Cafferty courted controversy on September 23, 2004 while discussing terrorist demands for the release of two women scientists from an Iraqi prison and remarking: "Given the way these mutants treat women in their societies, the women are probably better off in U.S. custody. They treat women like furniture in those countries. If I was a woman, I think I’d rather be in an American jail cell than I would be living with one of those, whatever they are over there."

On November 17, 2004, touching on the kidnapping and murder of the Wall Street Journal's South Asia Bureau Chief Daniel Pearl, Cafferty remarked: "The Arab World is where innocent people are kidnapped, blindfolded, tied up, tortured and beheaded, and then videotape of all of this is released to the world as though they’re somehow proud of their barbarism. Somehow, I wouldn’t be too concerned about the sensitivity of the Arab world. They don’t seem to have very much. It's going to come down to them or us." The next day the American-Arab Anti-Discrimination Committee accused Cafferty of "hateful rhetoric" and stated that he had "a history of insensitive remarks towards many minority groups".

=== China ===
On the April 9, 2008 broadcast of CNN's The Situation Room, asked to comment on the United States' relationship with China, Cafferty responded: "I think they're basically the same bunch of goons and thugs they've been for the last 50 years". The Legal Immigrant Association started an online petition calling for a formal apology, indicating that Cafferty's rant was anti-Chinese and had the effect of exacerbating negative attitudes held by Americans toward Chinese and Chinese Americans. On the April 14, 2008 broadcast of CNN's Situation Room, Jack Cafferty clarified his remarks: "Last week, during a discussion of the controversy surrounding China's hosting of the Olympic Games, I said that the Chinese are basically the same bunch of goons and thugs they have been for the last 50 years. I was referring to the Chinese government, and not to Chinese people or to Chinese Americans." CNN issued a controversial apology on April 14, to "anyone who has interpreted the comments to be causing offense." Not satisfied with CNN's response, several thousand demonstrators picketed CNN's Atlanta, Georgia and Hollywood offices and demanded that CNN remove him from the network.

A protest was held on April 26, 2008 in front of CNN headquarters in Atlanta. On the same day, a few thousand Chinese and Chinese Americans protested in front of a CNN office in San Francisco.

On May 15, 2008, according to Chinese Foreign Ministry spokesman Qin Gang, CNN President Jim Walton sent a letter to Zhou Wenzhong, Chinese ambassador to the United States: "On behalf of CNN I'd like to apologize to the Chinese people for that. CNN has the highest respect for Chinese people around the world and we have no doubt that there was genuine offense felt by them over the Jack Cafferty commentary." CNN, however, denies that an apology to the Chinese government was ever made, stating that it was meant for the Chinese people alone.

=== Sarah Palin ===
On the September 26, 2008 edition of The Situation Room, Cafferty criticized Republican presidential candidate John McCain's vice presidential nominee, Alaska governor Sarah Palin after she did what he referred to as a "disastrous interview" with CBS news anchor Katie Couric when she could not clearly answer Couric's questions about the federal government's intervention into Wall Street. Cafferty went on to say that "if John McCain wins, this woman will be one 72 year old's heart beat away from becoming President of the United States, and if that doesn't scare the hell out of you, it should!" He went further to say that her interview with Couric was the most pathetic tape he had ever seen. When Wolf Blitzer came to Palin's defense, Cafferty snapped back indicating "there's no excuse for that, don't make excuses for her, that's pathetic!"

=== Nancy Pelosi ===
Cafferty was outspokenly critical of House Speaker Nancy Pelosi for failing to call for an impeachment against President Bush, calling her the "most awful" Speaker Congress has ever had. Cafferty sparked some national controversy among some liberal watchdog groups, particularly Media Matters for America during the January 12, 2010 broadcast of The Situation Room, in which Cafferty called her a "horrible woman" for refusing to disclose the precise cost of her trip to the Copenhagen Climate Summit, that Cafferty felt was a complete waste of tax payer money.

== Reckless driving incident ==
Cafferty pleaded guilty to leaving the scene of an accident and misdemeanor charges of reckless driving, assault and harassment after striking a cyclist and knocking him off his bike on May 14, 2003. The bicyclist was slightly injured. A traffic officer and several pedestrians ran after Cafferty's car, but he ran at least two red lights without stopping, according to a police complaint. Cafferty was sentenced to a $250 fine and 70 hours of community service.

== Personal life ==
Cafferty was born in Chicago. He is a recovering alcoholic, an addiction he later attributed to his father's influence. "I was actually taught to drink, without even realizing what was going on, by my dad", he said.

On the September 5, 2008 episode of The Situation Room with Wolf Blitzer, it was revealed that Cafferty's wife of 35 years, Carol, had died that day of unknown causes. Cafferty acknowledged on his CNN blog that his wife had been responsible for his decision to quit drinking.

Cafferty has been a resident of Cedar Grove, New Jersey.
