= Sue Simmons =

American retired news anchor

- Born: May 27, 1942 (age 84); New York City, U.S.
- Occupations: Television news anchor, actress
- Years active: 1970s–present
- Known for: WNBC-TV New York news anchor

Sue Simmons (born May 27, 1942) is an American retired news anchor who was best known for being the lead anchorwoman at WNBC in New York City from 1980 to 2012. Her contract with WNBC expired in June 2012 and WNBC announced that it would not renew it. Her final broadcast was on June 15, 2012, shortly after her 70th birthday.

== Early life and education ==
Simmons grew up in the Manhattan neighborhood of Greenwich Village; her father was John Simmons, a jazz bassist whose contemporaries included Louis Armstrong, Art Tatum, John Coltrane, Billie Holiday, Benny Goodman, Lena Horne and Nat King Cole.

She graduated from Julia Richman High School in 1961 and decided to work instead of going on to college.

== Career ==
=== WNBC ===
She began her career as a consumer action reporter at WTNH-TV in New Haven, Connecticut. She was with WBAL-TV in Baltimore from 1974 to 1976 where she was an anchor for the station's Action News and Baltimore At One broadcasts. From 1976 to 1980 she was a reporter and anchor at WRC-TV in Washington, DC, an NBC owned-and-operated station.

From 1980 to 2007, she was a co-anchor for WNBC's Live at Five news broadcast. She worked with several co-anchors, including Jack Cafferty, Tony Guida, Matt Lauer, Dean Shepherd, Jim Rosenfield, Perri Peltz, and David Ushery. In 2007, Live at Five broadcast for the final time. Weeknights at 11 p.m., she co-anchored with Chuck Scarborough. On March 7, 2012, WNBC announced that it would not renew its contract with Simmons; the contract expired in June. Simmons' final broadcast was on June 15, 2012; she received farewells from long time co-workers, as well as numerous sports figures and celebrities. Simmons was replaced on the 11 p.m. newscast by Shiba Russell.

Chuck and Sue (as they were known in New York) were together since Simmons' arrival at WNBC—the longest run for an anchor team in New York City television history. She was one of the highest paid local anchors in New York, making $5 million a year.

Simmons was referenced in the song Traffic and Weather by the power pop band Fountains of Wayne.

On June 23, 2017, Simmons returned to WNBC for a tribute to Gabe Pressman, longtime reporter for the station who died earlier in the day at age 93.

==== On-air profanity ====
On May 12, 2008, as a live news teaser was played, Simmons was heard loudly exclaiming, "The fuck are you doing?" It was later revealed that her remark was directed at distracted co-anchor Chuck Scarborough. She later apologized on-air for her inappropriate language. The incident has been mocked in several sketches on CBS's Late Show with David Letterman. The clip was later featured in a 2021 episode of HBO's Last Week Tonight with John Oliver. Simmons has stated that she was normally notified proactively when the newscast was broadcasting live, because she had a reputation for being caught on the air during candid moments. On that particular occasion, she had not been notified, and she exclaimed the profanity while attempting to get the attention of Scarborough, who was preoccupied with his computer. Later, during the newscast, Simmons apologized for using "a word that many people find offensive. It was a mistake I made and I'm truly sorry."

==== Back surgery ====
In November and December 2010, Simmons was away from her job while she underwent back surgery. On January 3, 2011, she returned to work. However, when she returned from surgery she was no longer a part of the 6 p.m. newscast and only co-anchored the 11 p.m. newscast.

=== Acting ===
Sue Simmons made her acting debut as herself in the fourteenth season premiere episode of the NBC legal drama, Law & Order: Special Victims Unit. Simmons went on to guest star as herself on NBC comedy series 30 Rock. She has also appeared in other television series and films in the role of a newscaster, including: The First Wives Club (1996), Exiled: A Law & Order Movie (1998) and Elementary (2012).

Year	Title	Role	Notes
1988	The Magical World of Disney	Herself (WNBC-TV anchor)	Episode: "Mickey's 60th Birthday"
1996	The First Wives Club	Newscaster	
1997	Destination Anywhere	Newscaster	
1998	Exiled: A Law & Order Movie	Newscaster	Television film
1999	Light It Up	Newscaster	
2012–13	Law & Order: Special Victims Unit	Newscaster (herself)	Recurring role; Episodes: "Lost Reputation", "Above Suspicion" and "Funny Valentine"
2012	30 Rock	Newscaster (herself)	Episode: "My Whole Life Is Thunder"
2012	Elementary	Newscaster	Episode: "The Leviathan"
