= Jim Rosenfield =

American local television news anchor

- Born: December 18, 1958 (age 67)

Jim Rosenfield is an American local television news anchor who worked for WCAU-TV, the NBC-owned television station in Philadelphia, Pennsylvania.

== Career ==
Rosenfield started his television news career in 1981, after graduating from Duke University. He started out at WTVD-TV in Durham, North Carolina, where he was a general assignment reporter. He moved to Houston, KTRK-TV, as a reporter and eventually anchor. He later moved to Chicago, where he became a reporter and weekend anchor at WLS-TV. He came to New York in 1998, and joined WCBS-TV, where he co-anchored the noon newscast with Cindy Hsu, and the 5pm newscast with Lisa Cooley (later known as Lisa Hill).

He left WCBS in April 2000 after a contract dispute and joined rival station WNBC-TV, where he co-anchored the 5pm newscast ("Live at Five") with Sue Simmons. He left WNBC in 2005, and returned to WCBS in June of that year to replace Ernie Anastos, who in turn left WCBS for a 5-year $10 million contract at WNYW-TV. He was one of the hirings of Dianne Doctor, who had been his previous boss at WNBC.

This move allowed Rosenfield to become lead male anchor at a local New York station, which would not have happened if he remained at WNBC (where longtime anchor Chuck Scarborough is locked in as anchor at 6pm for years to come).

Between June 2005 and April 2006, Rosenfield anchored CBS 2 News at 5 and CBS 2 News at 11 with Roz Abrams. In April 2006 he dropped the 5PM newscast and joined Dana Tyler at 6PM, while also keeping the 11PM with Tyler. Abrams had moved to noon and 5PM (but is now no longer at the station).

In June 2007, he and Dana Tyler were reassigned to the noon and 6pm newscasts at WCBS by new station managers.

In May 2008, the station's management decided to let him go as the noon and 6PM newscaster as a part of major CBS budget cuts across the owned station division (political reporter Andrew Kirtzman was let go in March; Roz Abrams was let go for similar reasons in 2006). As the station was in breach of his contract it was considered a matter of time before Rosenfield would leave the station.

On June 1, 2012, it was announced that Rosenfield would be joining WRC-TV in Washington, D.C. as a weekend news anchor, effective June 4.

In September 2013, Rosenfield was asked by the NBC station division to join WCAU-TV in Philadelphia as weeknight anchor at 4, 6, and 11 p.m.

On December 8, 2022 it was announced by WCAU-TV that Rosenfield would be leaving the station after 9 years to "be closer to home and pursue new opportunities." He will be moving back to New York to be closer to family, but has not made any specific announcements as to his future career plans. His last day on air was December 23, 2022. His departure was part of buyout offers by NBC.

== Video of Rosenfield ==
- September 11, 1988 weekend newscast, KTRK-TV Houston (ABC) 13 Eyewitness News Tonight
- September 3, 1986: KTRK-TV Houston (ABC) 13 Eyewitness News Tonight
- Sunday, May 1, 1988: KTRK-TV Houston (ABC) 13 Eyewitness News at 5:30 PM on YouTube (From 31:00-31:36)

== Sources ==
- "Rosenfield's back at Channel 2". Daily News. Archived from the original on January 11, 2007.
- "Ch. 2 lifts anchors for new shifts". Daily News. June 22, 2007. Archived from the original on June 25, 2007.
- "CH. 2 Quinn not so good at weather". Daily News. June 29, 2007. Archived from the original on September 30, 2007.
- "Anchor Jim Rosenfield is casualty of CBS cutbacks". Daily News. May 20, 2008. Archived from the original on May 31, 2008.
- After Nine Years, Jim Rosenfield to Bid Farewell to NBC10
