= John Johnson (reporter) =

American television personality and artist (born 1938)

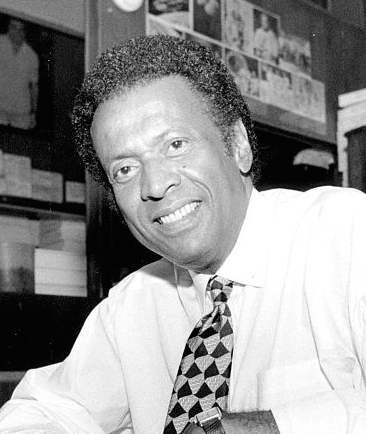
- Johnson in 1995
- Born: June 20, 1938 (age 88); New York City, U.S.
- Education: B.A. City College of NY M.A. City College of NY Honorary Doctorate St. Thomas Aquinas College
- Alma mater: City College of New York
- Occupations: Documentary filmmaker, television correspondent/anchorman, Artist (canvas painting), author
- Spouses: E. Jean Carroll; Ann Yih Johnson
- Children: 4 (as of 1996)

John Johnson (born June 20, 1938) is an American television anchorman, senior correspondent, documentary filmmaker, and visual artist. He was a reporter on New York City television news for many years.

== Education and early career ==
Johnson studied art at the City College of New York, planning a career as an art educator. He then became an associate professor of fine art at Lincoln University in Pennsylvania.

== Television journalism career ==
Johnson joined ABC News in 1968, ultimately becoming the first African American documentary producer, director and writer at a broadcast network. He won distinction for his documentaries Welfare Game and Strangers in Their Own Land: The Puerto Ricans. He was one of the first black filmmakers in the prestigious Directors Guild of America. Johnson then became a network correspondent and covered such stories as the Attica Prison riot that led to the deaths of 33 prisoners and 10 corrections officers. Johnson was inside the prison when guards and state troopers shot to death 29 prisoners and nine hostages. A tenth hostage later died. State officials falsely claimed that the prisoners had cut the throats of the hostages, and many news outlets repeated the erroneous accounts. Johnson declined to do so because he had seen no such thing. Interviewed decades later, he said, "I didn’t see that. All I saw were troopers, police and Guardsmen going in with guns and firing in a cloud of smoke."

In 1972, Johnson began a long run at WABC. Johnson was among the pioneers of the Eyewitness News format at WABC after it first came to New York in 1968. Decades later, the New York Times quoted Johnson's description of the multiculturalism of those early years: "We really did something different, we had a personality, and a news team that was a microcosm of America . . . We were black, white, Jewish, Latino. That’s why it became so beloved."

In the late 1980s, in the aftermath of Roger Grimsby's firing, he served as a rotating anchor of the 6 p.m. newscast with Kaity Tong and Bill Beutel. Johnson, who had also anchored the station's weekend newscasts and served as a reporter prior to this, eventually returned to reporting as senior correspondent after WABC made the decision to have Beutel anchor the 6 p.m. newscast by himself. During his years as senior correspondent, Johnson covered the release of Nelson Mandela from a South African prison and his presidential election. He reported from the first Gulf War, the Bosnian War and was one of the first reporters landing with American troops during the Unified Task Force intervention in Somalia. One of Johnson's last assignments at WABC was his reporting at the O. J. Simpson murder case in 1994-95.

While the trial was still going on, Johnson left WABC in March 1995 and became co-anchor of WCBS' 5 p.m. and 11 p.m. newscasts in June of that same year. Johnson remained at the station until October 1996 when, along with several other notable personalities, he was fired. The firings came abruptly, as Johnson and co-anchor Michele Marsh previewed the upcoming 11pm newscast at the end of the 6 pm news, with their dismissals occurring in the interim four and a half hours.

Johnson was not out of work for long, as he and his WCBS co-anchor Michele Marsh were hired by WNBC to anchor the station's new noon newscast. After a year, however, Johnson left WNBC to care for his father who was dying of cancer, and never returned to TV.

During his 30-year television news career, Johnson won nine Emmys and numerous other awards as a reporter, producer, writer and director.

== Autobiography ==
Johnson published his autobiography Only Son: A Memoir (Warner Books) in 2002. His memoir achieved success in China, where it was published in a Chinese language edition. In the book, Johnson describes his childhood in Harlem and Bedford-Stuyvesant. According to a review in Publishers Weekly, the book describes an "intense love-hate dynamic between his abusive father, 'Black Jack,' and his alcoholic mother, Irene—in a narrative frightening in its emotional intensity." The review concluded that the book is "an impressive portrait of tenacity, fury and ambition, and reconciliation within an inescapable family frame."

== Painter ==
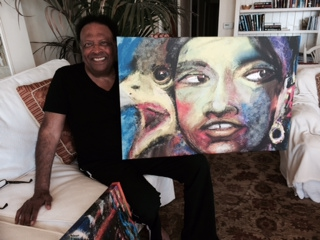
John Johnson with one of his paintings, 2015

Johnson was an associate professor of fine arts and Chairman of the Arts Department at Lincoln University in Pennsylvania and a guest lecturer at other universities before his broadcast career.

After retiring from broadcasting, Johnson resumed his painting career. According to Johnson, his paintings have been shown at The Metropolitan Museum of Art and Walter Wickiser Gallery in Manhattan.

== Media appearances ==
Johnson has portrayed himself in such films as Cop Land and 54. He was also featured in the award-winning documentary Eyes on the Prize and a 2021 documentary, Attica, which was nominated for an Oscar.

== Personal life ==
Johnson was previously married to journalist E. Jean Carroll. As of 1996, he has four children. As of 2021, he is married to Ann Yih Johnson.
