= Dave Marash =

American journalist

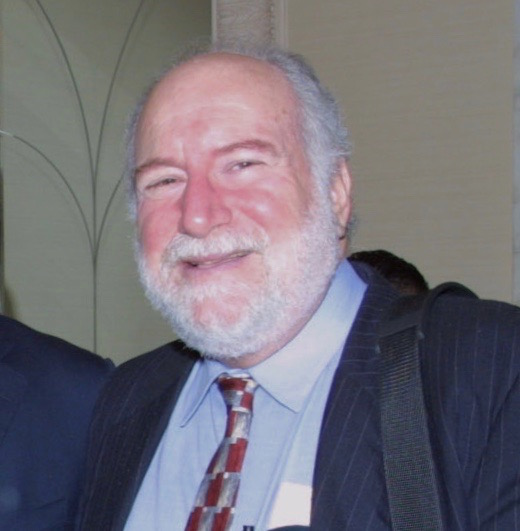
- Marash in 2002
- Born: Atlanta, Georgia, U.S.
- Education: Williams College
- Occupations: Journalist; News anchor Television presenter Sports commentator

Dave Marash (born c. 1942) is an American television journalist known for his work at ABC News and Al Jazeera English.

== Life and career ==
Marash was born to a Jewish family, his father having been a director of a Jewish Community Center in Richmond, Virginia. A graduate of Williams College, Marash worked at New Brunswick, New Jersey, station WCTC-AM (1450), where he hosted a nightly talk show, Dave Marash On Call. He had also been a reporter at WPIX. He did both news and sports reporting for WCBS Newsradio 88 and WNEW-FM in New York City. He subsequently worked at WCBS-TV in New York.

Marash was host of ESPN's Baseball Tonight and NBC's GrandStand, which alternated as a National Football League pregame show or a sports anthology series, depending on the season. In the early years of the Fox television network, Marash hosted a magazine-style show of science and technology entitled Beyond Tomorrow.

He then worked at ABC News. His last appearance prior to joining Al Jazeera English was on Nightline. He had anchored newscasts at WNBC in New York and WRC-TV in Washington, D.C., during the mid-1980s. He received Emmy Awards for his Nightline coverage of the Oklahoma City bombing and for his coverage of the explosion of TWA Flight 800. His May 2001 Nightline documentary about singer Eva Cassidy was one of the highlights of his years with the program.

Marash garnered considerable attention when he joined Al Jazeera English in January 2006 as the network's Washington, D.C., anchor, thus becoming the de facto American face of the new English-language station. Two years later, in March 2008, he stepped down from his position. Marash explained, "To put it bluntly, the channel that's on now—while excellent, and I plan to be a lifetime viewer—is not the channel that I signed up to do." Specifically, he cited the loss of editorial control and his inability to vouch for content that the network was broadcasting, as reasons for his departure.

On February 14, 2011, Marash defended Al Jazeera English on the O'Reilly Factor on Fox News against claims by Bill O'Reilly that Al Jazeera was anti-American. He joined Santa Fe, New Mexico, public radio station KSFR-FM 101.1 in March 2014 as co–news director.

Since September 2014, he has hosted the radio show and podcast Here & There: a four-times-weekly series of 50-minute news interviews.
