= Chuck Scarborough =

American television journalist and author (born 1943)

- Born: Charles Bishop Scarborough III; November 4, 1943 (age 83); Pittsburgh, Pennsylvania, U.S.
- Education: University of Southern Mississippi (B.S.)
- Occupations: Television news anchor, narrator, author
- Years active: 1972–2024
- Known for: WNBC-TV New York news anchor
- Spouses: Linda Gross; Anne Ford; Ellen Ward
- Children: 2

Charles Bishop Scarborough III (born November 4, 1943) is an American retired television journalist and author. From 1974 to 2024, he was the lead news anchor at WNBC, the New York City flagship station of the NBC Television Network and has also appeared on NBC News.

== Life and career ==
A native of Pittsburgh and a graduate of the University of Southern Mississippi, Scarborough served in the United States Air Force and currently has a commercial pilot certificate. His career in television began in Mississippi as a reporter at WLOX-TV in Biloxi and later WDAM-TV in Laurel, before moving to WAGA-TV in Atlanta.

Scarborough's first major market anchoring job came in 1972, at WNAC-TV in Boston. He was originally hired as part of a two-man anchor team with respected New England journalist Lee Nelson, but was soon made the solo anchor of the station's news broadcasts. In addition to his anchor work, he was called on to host a weekly program called Mass Reaction, in which the public was invited to the studio to question news broadcasters and newsmakers.

In his final broadcast on WNAC-TV, Scarborough ended the newscast with a commentary in which he identified the issue of race as the most important challenge facing Boston. A scant few months later, Boston erupted into racial unrest as the result of a federal court order to end its policy of de facto racial segregation in the public schools. While WNAC had been the perennial trailer among Boston's three VHF television news broadcasts, with Scarborough as anchor the station managed to best its rivals in the 6pm newscast ratings.

Scarborough joined NBC News in March 1974 as co-anchor along with Jim Hartz of WNBC-TV's then-new 5:00 PM newscast, NewsCenter 4 (later renamed News 4 New York). Eventually, he became the station's lead anchor at 6pm and 11pm. In 2003, he became the unofficial "dean" of New York-area television news anchors when WABC-TV anchor Bill Beutel retired after 37 years. He surpassed Beutel as New York's most tenured English-language news anchor in 2011. Five years later, Scarborough succeeded Rafael Pineda of Spanish-language WXTV as the longest-serving anchor in New York television history. For much of his first 20 years with NBC, he occasionally appeared on the network as an NBC News correspondent and often anchored the network's prime-time news updates. On the day of the 1989 Loma Prieta earthquake, Scarborough anchored NBC News overnight coverage.

At WNBC, he worked alongside Marv Albert, Len Berman, Jack Cafferty, Dr. Frank Field, John Hambrick, Pat Harper, Pia Lindstrom, Sue Simmons, Michele Marsh, Al Roker, and Tom Snyder, among others.

Scarborough was the host of the syndicated programs Images – A Year in Review and Memories...Then and Now in the late 1980s-early 1990s, and also co-anchored the NBC network documentary series Yesterday, Today and Tomorrow with Maria Shriver and Mary Alice Williams.

The 11:00 pm broadcast on July 14, 2017, marked Scarborough's last as a regular anchor in that time slot after 42 years, as he cut back on his schedule to working only the 6pm. Taking his place at 11 was Stefan Holt, the son of NBC Nightly News anchor Lester Holt. (Holt was later succeeded by David Ushery when Holt returned to WMAQ in Chicago). Scarborough has since appeared several times on the 11:00pm edition, filling in when Ushery has time off. On November 21, 2024, Scarborough announced that he would be retiring. His final broadcast was on December 12, 2024.

== Awards and honors ==
Scarborough has won 36 local Emmy Awards, and was one of the first inductees into the New York State Broadcasters Association Hall of Fame in 2005. He was inducted alongside Sue Simmons, his co-anchoring partner from 1980 until Simmons's retirement in June 2012. They were together longer than any other anchor team in New York City television history.

== Personal life ==
Scarborough is wed to Ellen Ward and was married previously to Linda Gross and Anne Ford (great-granddaughter of Henry Ford). He has two children, Chad and Elizabeth. His daughter Elizabeth has followed in her father's footsteps as a television journalist. He and his family reside in Stamford, Connecticut.

== Novels ==
Scarborough has written three novels:

- Stryker (1978), ISBN 0-02-606920-2.
- The Myrmidon Project (1980), ISBN 0-698-11054-4.
- Aftershock (1991), ISBN 0-517-58014-4.

Aftershock was made into a made for television movie, Aftershock: Earthquake in New York in 1999, airing on the CBS television network.

== In popular culture ==
Scarborough appeared in the opening scene in The Corruptor, reporting on a bombing of a Chinese tong gang member by the Fukanese Dragons. He was also in The Adjustment Bureau, reporting a story for WNBC about the film's protagonist, David Norris (Matt Damon), and in two episodes of the NBC sitcom Veronica's Closet.

== See also ==
- New Yorkers in journalism
