= Mary Calvi =

American broadcast journalist and author (born 1969)

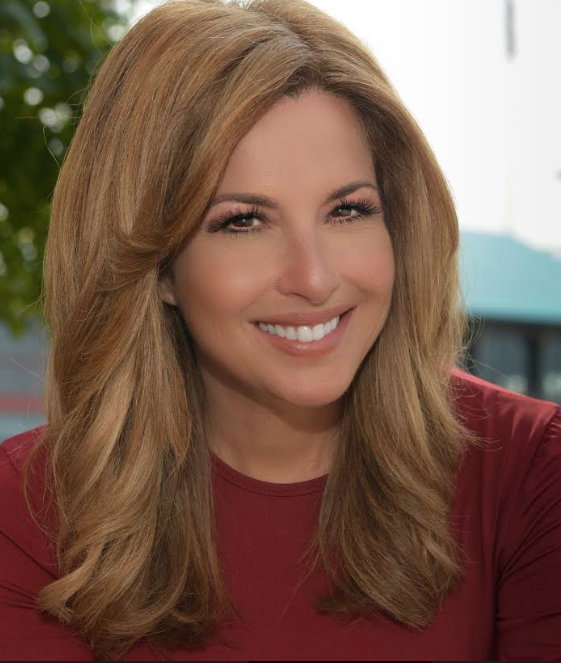
- Calvi in 2018
- Born: Mary Ann Calvi; June 11, 1969 (age 57); Westchester County, New York, U.S.
- Education: Syracuse University (BA)
- Occupations: Television journalist and author
- Spouse: Mike Spano (m. 1996)
- Children: 3
- Writing career
- Years active: 2002–present
- Genre: Historical fiction
- Notable awards: 13 x Emmy Awards
- Website: marycalvi.com

Mary Calvi is an American television journalist and author of If a Poem Could Live and Breathe: A Novel of Teddy Roosevelt's First Love, publishing Valentine's Day 2023, which is based on love letters from Gilded Age to and from Roosevelt and his first love, many of which have never been published. Her first book was named Dear George, Dear Mary: A Novel of George Washington's First Love. Her research is profiled in the Smithsonian Channel documentary, "George Washington's Secret Love."

She is the co-anchor of the daily morning and noon news broadcasts at WCBS-TV in New York City, and has been the weekend anchor and weekday fill-in anchor for the syndicated newsmagazine Inside Edition since July 2020. Over the course of her career, Calvi has won thirteen New York Emmy Awards.

== Early life and education ==
Calvi was born and raised in Westchester County, New York. She graduated from Maria Regina High School in Hartsdale, NY and magna cum laude with a degree in broadcast journalism from the S. I. Newhouse School of Public Communications at Syracuse University in June 1989.

== Career ==
Calvi began her career at a New York radio station as a news anchor and reporter.

She then served as news anchor and assistant news director for the News 12 Networks in Westchester, which operates seven regional cable-television news channels in the New York metropolitan area.

In March 2002, Calvi joined WCBS — a local broadcast-television station located in New York City, and the flagship station of the CBS broadcast-television network — where she is a news anchor.

Her novel, Dear George, Dear Mary: A Novel of George Washington's First Love is published by St. Martin's Press along with an award-winning audio book of the same name.

Calvi is the recipient of twelve Emmy Awards, including for her breaking-news reportage of the "Miracle on the Hudson", the 2009 emergency landing of US Airways Flight 1549. She has also received Emmy Award nominations in the "breaking news" and "special reports" categories.

== Appearance in popular culture ==
The Smithsonian Channel documentary film "George Washington's Secret Love" (2021), features Calvi's journey into discovering a never-before-known story of George Washington and his first love, Mary Philipse. The HBO documentary film Indian Point: Imagining the Unimaginable (2004), directed by Rory Kennedy, features several video clips of Calvi anchoring the news.

== Personal life ==
Calvi has three children with her husband, Mike Spano, who was elected mayor of Yonkers, New York, in 2011.
