= Good Day New York =

Weekday morning TV show

- Good Day New York 2006 logo
- Also known as: Good Day Wake Up (1991–present); Good Day Early Call (2010–present)
- Created by: Peter Brennan
- Presented by: Rosanna Scotto (2008–present); Curt Menefee (2024–2026); Ines Rosales (2007–present); Mike Woods (2003–present)
- Opening theme: "Beyond" by Stephen Arnold
- Country of origin: United States
- Original language: English

Production
- Production locations: Fox Television Center, Yorkville, Manhattan
- Camera setup: Multi-camera
- Running time: 330 minutes (5 hours, 30 minutes)

Original release
- Network: WNYW
- Release: August 1, 1988 – present

Good Day New York is a morning show airing on WNYW Fox 5 (channel 5), hosted by Rosanna Scotto and Curt Menefee. It is a Fox owned-and-operated television station in New York City, owned by the Fox Television Stations subsidiary of Fox Corporation. It was the first morning newscast to air on a Fox-owned station, having launched on August 1, 1988. The program broadcasts each weekday morning from 4:30 to 10 a.m. Eastern Time. The 4:30–7 a.m. portion is a general news/traffic/weather format. The 7–9 a.m. portion still features news, traffic and weather, but also incorporates entertainment news. The 9–10 a.m. hour addition is entertainment segments including celebrity interviews, politicians etc., as well as feature segments, food, fashion and more.

== History ==
At the program's debut, Good Day was hosted by veteran WNYW reporter Marian Etoile Watson and radio personality Bob Fitzsimmons. After only a few months, Watson and Fitzsimmons were dropped in favor of Jim Ryan, who became sole anchor; Watson remained on the program in a reduced role. By 1990, Ryan was joined by weathercaster Julie Golden and newsreader Lyn Brown, who also later served as the anchor of Good Day Wake Up. Brown later flipped positions with then-GDNY co-host Maria Genero, with Genero co-anchoring Wake Up alongside Mario Bosquez. When Genero was let go from WNYW, Brown moved back to Wake Up as Bosquez's co-anchor, While Felipe Luciano and Lynne White anchored First Edition , in the early/mid 1990s, While Jim Ryan continued anchoring the main program solo and Brown provided news updates and conducted interview segments, until 1999 when Lyn Brown co-anchored the main program alongside Jim Ryan.

Good Day New York's first logo, used from August 1, 1988, to 1991

On the morning of September 11, 2001, the program broadcast some of the first live images of the terrorist attack on the World Trade Center. The program interrupted a commercial for the 2001 Ben Stiller comedy film Zoolander at 8:48 a.m., to show video from a tower camera atop the Empire State Building and its news helicopter Chopper 5 (now SkyFox HD) of the WTC's North Tower on fire after the first plane hit. Kai Simonsen reported from Chopper 5, which captured footage of the second plane crashing into the South Tower.

In 2002, Mario Bosquez left WNYW for WCBS-TV (channel 2), and was replaced on Good Day Wake Up by Ken Rosato. Ken would then report for GDNY, anchor the midday show and report for the 5pm and 6pm broadcasts. He would later leave WNYW for WABC-TV (channel 7) and was replaced by Chris Gailus. Lyn Brown also provided news stories and interview segments on GDNY, with Ryan acting as primary anchor. Ryan and Brown displayed a great deal of chemistry on-air, and Brown appeared on-air for the majority of the 7-9 a.m. block. In 2004, Lucy Noland joined WNYW as Gailus' co-anchor on Wake Up, with Gailus also taking over as newsreader on GDNY. Brown's role on GDNY, shifted to doing interviews and feature stories during the 7-9 a.m. block of the program.

When Gailus was moved to the evening newscasts, Brown was brought back for a few months to anchor Wake Up with Noland, continuing to provide interviews and feature stories on the main GDNY program. Jodi Applegate later replaced Brown completely, when she moved to the evening newscasts with Ernie Anastos, anchoring solo from 6-7 a.m. with Noland, and acting as newsreader and co-anchoring with Ryan on GDNY from 7-9 a.m. Ryan retired shortly afterward, and Gailus took over as co-anchor of GDNY from 6-9 a.m., with Noland doing news updates and news-related interviews; Noland then began to solo anchor Wake Up.

In April 2006, former WCBS-TV traffic reporter Vanessa Alfano joined WNYW as a feature reporter and substitute meteorologist for the morning newscasts. At the same time, she became a full-time weathercaster for channel 5's Secaucus sister station WWOR-TV (channel 9). In late 2006, Mark Joyella joined the Good Day New York team with his infamous Mark's Missions and Fox Soup segments, which aired every Friday. The first segment featured Joyella being assigned missions from the anchors; if he did not complete the mission as it was requested, he would be ordered to perform an embarrassing stunt. The latter segment, Fox Soup, reflected on the highlighted mistakes/bloopers that occurred in the corresponding week.

Joyella left the station in early 2007, effectively resulting in the removal of the two segments. In March 2007, both Lucy Noland and Stacy-Ann Gooden left Good Day. Lynda López unofficially replaced Noland, before Christina Park joined as a full-time anchor; Gooden, meanwhile, was replaced by Ines Rosales. Park would eventually be moved to the weekend 6 and 10 p.m. newscasts with then-weekend anchor Karen Hepp moving to Good Day, and former WPIX reporter Julie Chang joining the program to cover entertainment stories.

Ron Corning was let go from the program while on vacation during the week of April 7, 2008. It was the first move by news director Dianne Doctor, notorious for shaking up the talent lineup on New York area newscasts, often with mixed results. Corning's departure was met with an overwhelming outcry from GDNY viewers. That same week, Corning and Applegate won Good Day an Emmy Award for best morning show. On July 9, 2008, WNYW announced that Greg Kelly would replace Corning on the program beginning July 1. On September 22, 2008, popular WNYW 10 p.m. anchor Rosanna Scotto was moved to the main Good Day program, taking over the co-anchor spot with Kelly in place of the departing Jodi Applegate.

In February 2009, Heather Nauert was appointed co-anchor of Good Day Wake Up, alongside Reid Lamberty; she would later go on maternity leave in July of that year, with business reporter Lisa Murphy filling in for Nauert. On July 13, 2009, Good Day New York was expanded by one hour until 10:00 a.m., as a result of the cancellation of syndicated talk show The Morning Show with Mike and Juliet. After Lamberty departed the station in October 2009, Murphy was named co-anchor of Wake Up alongside Nauert. Murphy left WNYW for Bloomberg Television in October 2010, with Dick Brennan, the station's chief political correspondent, serving as an interim anchor until a permanent replacement was found. Nauert went on maternity leave again in November 2010, prior to the birth of her second child, with Good Day New York reporter Tai Hernandez filling in. In August 2011, Nauert returned from maternity leave, with Hernandez resuming her reporting duties. Steve Lacy was also named full-time co-anchor of Wake Up. In March 2012, Nauert joined the Fox News Channel's Fox and Friends First as its co-host, simultaneously remaining on Good Day, although typically appearing every three weeks; Tai Hernandez then took on co-anchoring duties.

On June 30, 2012, Greg Kelly was appointed anchor of the 6:00 and 10:00 p.m. newscasts, respectively replacing Harry Martin and Ernie Anastos on both programs. It was also announced that former Good Day weather anchor Dave Price would rejoin the program, replacing Kelly as co-anchor. The move was met with much controversy, with ratings in the first month of Price's role as morning co-anchor becoming significantly lower than usual, falling behind perennial runner-up WPIX (channel 11)'s morning newscast. In October 2012, Nauert left WNYW, due to her increased duties on Fox and Friends First. Tai Hernandez became Wake Up co-anchor, although she would later leave the station in March 2013.

On January 24, 2013, Dave Price announced his departure from Good Day New York and former host Greg Kelly would be returning and Good Day Early Call and Wake Up anchor Steve Lacy would replace Greg Kelly at the 6 p.m. and 10 p.m. news. Antwan Lewis would become the interim host of the 4:30-7 a.m. show, while the station decides on the new permanent host.

In June 2013, Ben Simmoneau joined Good Day New York as the co-anchor to Juliet Huddy, (for Good Day Wake Up) who replaced Tai Hernandez. Simmoneau would take Antwan Lewis' seat while he moved to become the anchor of the Weekend Editions of Fox 5 News at 6 and 10 PM with Christina Park. On June 14, 2016, it was announced that he would be joining WCVB Channel 5 in Boston as an anchor/reporter, where, beginning July 6, he co-anchors NewsCenter 5 at 5PM as well as The 10 O'Clock News on MeTV Boston.

On November 1, 2016, Antwan Lewis was moved from anchor of the Weekend Editions of the Fox 5 News at 6 and 10 PM to join Teresa Priolo as host of the 4:30-7am show. The two fill the slots left by the departure of Juliet Huddy in September and Ben Simmoneau in May.

On August 21, 2017, Sukanya Krishnan and Jennifer Lahmers became anchors of Good Day Wake Up 4:30-7 a.m. Teresa Priolo and Antwan Lewis were moved to the evening newscasts at 5 and 10 p.m., becoming news reporters.

On September 29, 2017, Greg Kelly announced his departure from Good Day New York. Lori Stokes, who departed WABC-TV that August, replaced Kelly the following week. In 2021, Stokes would move to WNYW's evening broadcasts.

Curt Menefee, a former Fox 5 sports anchor who is also the studio host for the Fox network's National Football League coverage, became Scotto's co-anchor on January 16, 2024, while maintaining his Fox NFL Sunday duties.

== Ratings ==
For much of the time since its debut, Good Day New York has placed second among the New York City market's morning newscasts overall (behind WABC-TV), and ahead of WPIX's PIX 11 Morning News in the 7-9 a.m. timeslot. For the May 2008 sweeps period, Good Day's ratings had slipped, with WPIX's morning newscast tightening WNYW's lead.

For the February 2013 sweeps period, Good Day New York placed second in the 7-9 a.m. time period in the key demographic of adults 25–54, behind Good Morning America on WABC, but ahead of Today on WNBC by 10,000 homes, which placed third behind the locally produced WNYW newscast. The sweeps results were highly noted among industry media for being the first time that a local news program in the New York market placed ahead of Today on WNBC in the people meter ratings. March 2014, was an all-time high for the news program as well.

== Notable personalities ==
=== Good Day Wake Up ===
- Tashanea Whitlow - Anchor
- Dan Bowens - Anchor
- Tina Cervasio – Sports anchor
- Ryan Kristafer - Entertainment Anchor
- Mike Woods - Meteorologist
- Ines Rosales - Traffic Anchor

=== Good Day New York ===
- Rosanna Scotto – Anchor
- Curt Menefee - Anchor
- Mike Woods - Meteorologist
- Ryan Kristafer - Entertainment Anchor
- Tina Cervasio - Sports Anchor
- Ines Rosales- Traffic Anchor

=== Past anchors and reporters of Good Day New York and Good Day Wake Up ===
==== Former hosts ====
- Bianca Peters (2019-2024)
- Kerry Drew (2012-2021)
- Sukanya Krishnan (2017—2019)
- Jennifer Lahmers (2017–2019)
- Greg Kelly (2008–2017)
- Juliet Huddy (2012–2016)
- Ben Simmoneau (2013–2016)
- Jodi Applegate (2005–2008)
- Ron Corning
- Chris Gailus
- Dave Price (1999–2013)
- Jim Ryan (1988–2005)
- Felipe Luciano (1994–2000)
- Lynne White (1993–2000)
- Lyn Brown (1999–2006)
- Dick Brennan (2010–2011)
- Ernabel Demillo (2003–2005)
- Chris Gailus (2003–2005)
- Tai Hernandez (2010–2013)
- Reid Lamberty (2007–2009)
- Lynda Lopez (2007)
- Lisa Murphy (2009–2010)
- Heather Nauert (2009–2012)
- Ken Rosato (2001–2002); later at WABC-TV
- Kai Simonsen (1999–2011)

==== Former traffic reporters ====
- Nancy Remy
- Cande Roth
- Adrienne Watson
- Stacy Ann Gooden (now with WPIX)

==== Former entertainment reporters ====
- Julie Chang
- Naamua Delaney
- Teresa Strasser
- Anna Gilligan
- Baruch Shemtov

==== Former reporters ====
- Vanessa Alfano
- Robyn Carter
- George Ciccarone
- Penny Crone
- Andrea Day
- Gordon Elliott
- Larry Hoff
- Dick Oliver (1988–2002)
- Bobby Rivers

==== Former weather anchors ====
- Vanessa Alfano
- Dave Price
- Glenn "Hurricane" Schwartz
- Julie Golden

== Fox 5 Midday ==
In addition to Good Day, WNYW formerly produced a half-hour late morning newscast, called Fox 5 Live (also known as Fox 5 Midday).

=== History of Fox 5 Midday ===
The station's first attempt at a midday newscast was in 1985 with the short-lived First Edition News, anchored by Jim Ryan (who had just joined the station from WNBC) and Judy Licht; positioned initially at 11:30 AM as a lead-in to the long-running talk show Midday Live with Bill Boggs, the two were moved up to 12 and 12:30 PM by December.

The station resumed their attempt at a midday newscast with Fox News at Noon, anchored by Lyn Brown, sometime in 1993. By 1994, the newscast had moved to 11:30 AM and been renamed the Fox Midday News. At some point afterwards, the broadcast was joined by a combination talk show/newscast (similar in format to future sister station WWOR-TV's Nine Broadcast Plaza from the late 1980s), hosted by veteran NY anchor Carol Jenkins (who had just left WNBC), titled Carol Jenkins Live; a call-in number was a part of the format. This would be followed by the Fox Midday News. Soon after, this approach was abandoned and the program instead became just a straight newscast, re-titled to Fox 5 Live, and anchored by Mario Bosquez and Jenkins, who was later replaced by Lyn Brown. After Basquez left the station for WCBS-TV in 2003, Brown solo anchored the program until her retirement on June 30, 2006. Immediately afterwards, Lucy Noland became anchor of the broadcast, with Mike Woods as meteorologist. When Noland left in March of that year, Lynda Lopez began anchoring the program on a trial basis. Anne Craig, Ron Corning and Jodi Applegate occasionally served as fill-in anchors and reported for the broadcast, with Vanessa Alfano serving as a fill-in meteorologist. Reid Lamberty joined Lopez as co-anchor on August 13, 2007, in addition to a trial run on Good Day Wake Up as possible permanent replacements for Lucy Noland and Chris Gailus.

On September 12, 2006, the newscast was expanded to one hour and was moved up a half-hour to 11 a.m., in order to improve ratings. Despite this, WABC-TV's broadcast of ABC's The View remained in the ratings lead in the 11 a.m. timeslot.

In October 2007, Lopez returned to MyNetworkTV-affiliated sister station WWOR-TV and was replaced by CNN alumnus Christina Park. At the end of June 2008, however, Park was replaced by Karen Hepp, due to Park's move to the weekend evening newscasts. Soon after, Rosanna Scotto and Greg Kelly took over as anchors of the newscast when Hepp was released by the station. The program was cancelled (rather than being retained in its existing slot or moved to the noon hour) on July 13, 2009, coinciding with the addition of the 9:00 a.m. hour of Good Day New York.

== See also ==
- Good Day L.A. – a similar morning news and entertainment program on sister station KTTV in Los Angeles, California.
- KTLA Morning News: a competing morning news program on Los Angeles CW affiliate KTLA
- Today in L.A.: a competing morning news program on Los Angeles NBC owned-and-operated station KNBC
- Today in New York: a similar morning news program on New York NBC owned-and-operated station WNBC
