= Jennifer Lahmers =

American television news reporter, anchor and model

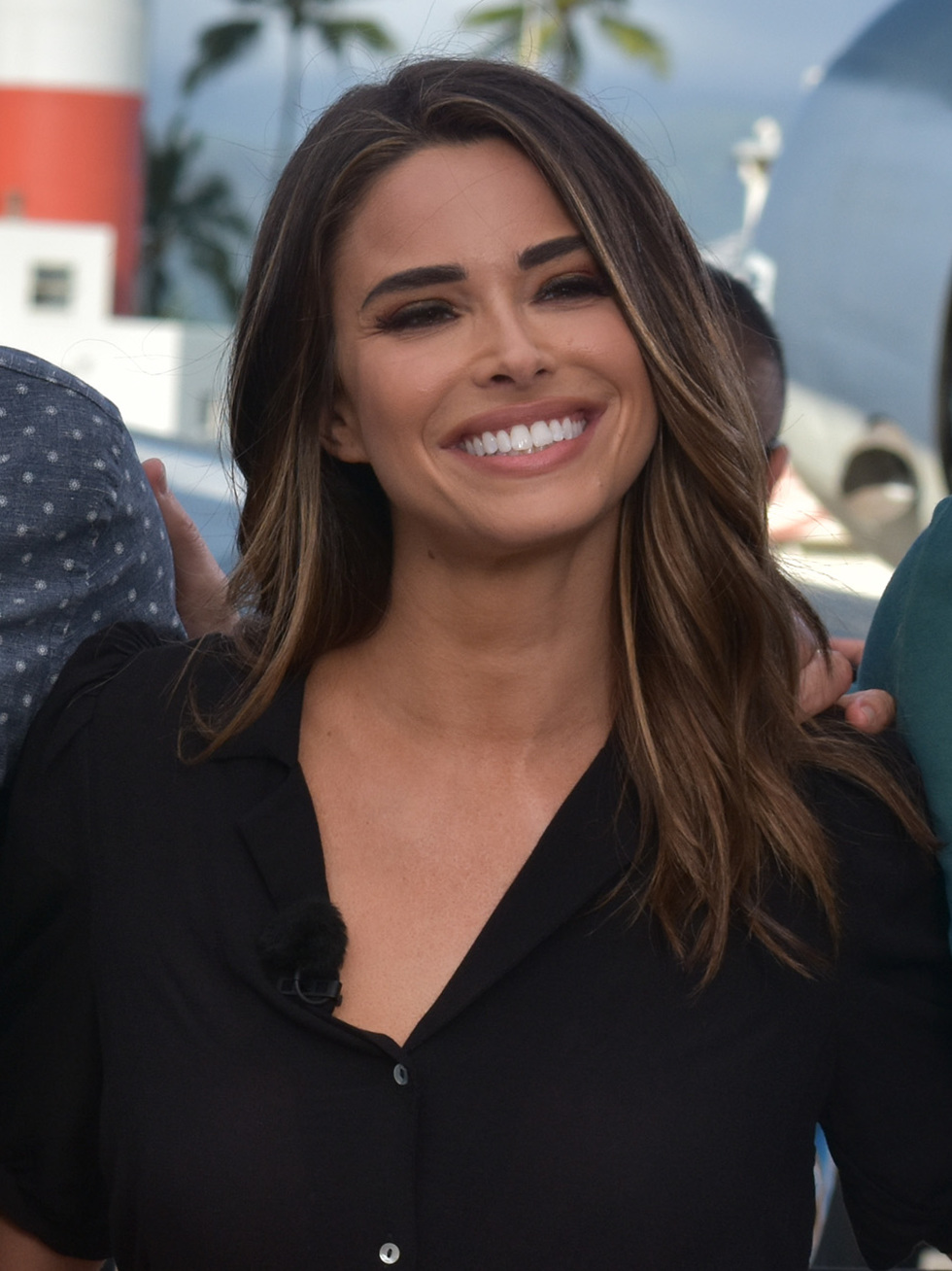
- Lahmers in 2019
- Born: Jennifer Lynn Lahmers; February 19, 1984 (age 42); Tuscarawas County, Ohio, U.S.
- Education: Ohio University
- Occupations: Journalist, Television news anchor, model
- Spouse: Jamie Bosworth (m. 2011; div. 2014)
- Partner: Jarod Keller (2021–present)
- Children: 1

Jennifer Lynn Lahmers (born February 19, 1984) is an American television news reporter, news anchor and model. She was a correspondent on Extra, a syndicated television newsmagazine reporting entertainment news from 2019 to 2023. Before joining Extra, Lahmers co-anchored Good Day Wake Up for Fox station WNYW in New York City and was a reporter and weekend anchor at several local television stations.

== Early life ==
Lahmers was born in Dover, Ohio, to parents William and Cathy. Lahmers has described herself as very shy as a child and young adult. Nonetheless, from a very early age she focused her interests on a career in television journalism. She attended Dover High School, graduating in 2002. In 2006, she graduated from the E.W. Scripps School of Journalism at Ohio University.

== Career ==
Lahmers' first job in journalism after graduation was as a reporter at WBBJ-TV in Jackson, Tennessee. She also anchored the weekend news at the station. While at WBBJ, Lahmers worked without writers or crew, writing and even shooting the news stories herself. In 2007 she joined Fox CT (now referred to as Fox 61) in Hartford, Connecticut, once again as a reporter; by the time of her departure in 2012, she was also working as the weekend news anchor at the station. While in Hartford, Lahmers also wrote columns for local publications such as the Hartford Courant.

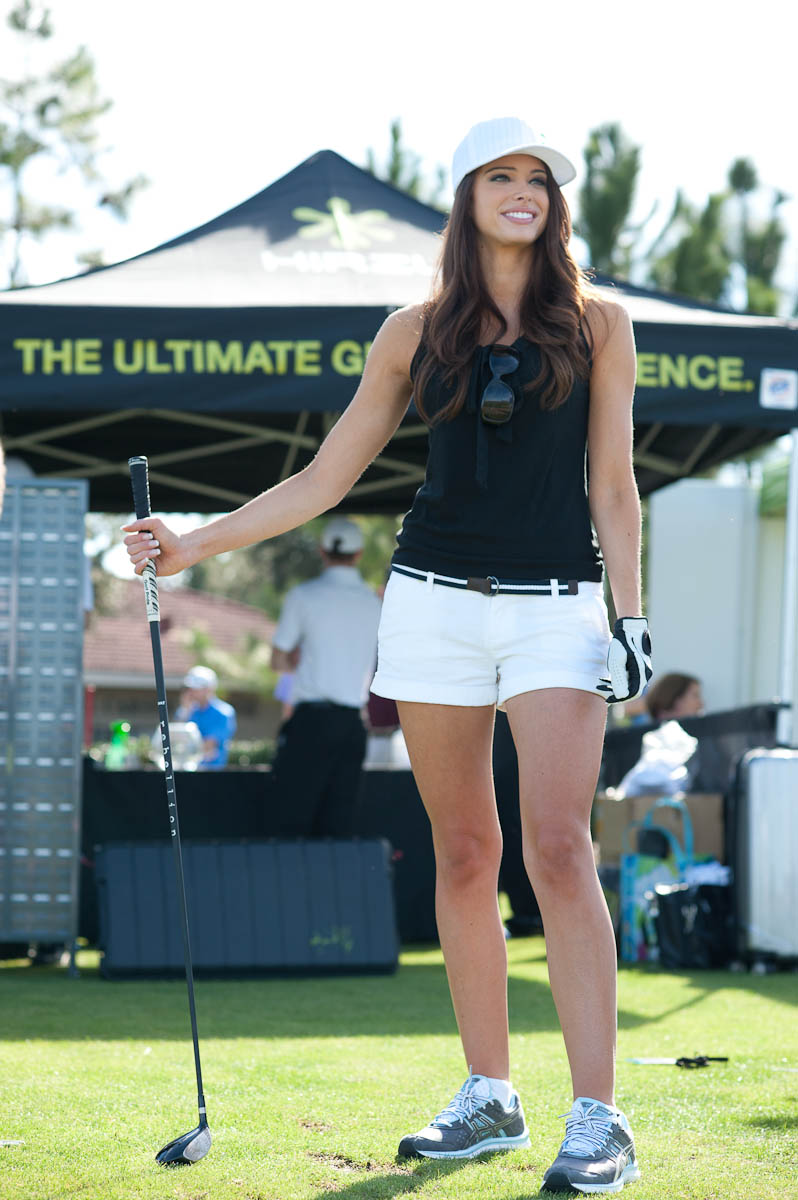
Presenting for the Back9Network in 2012.

From 2012 until 2014 Lahmers was an on-air personality at Back9Network, a golf cable television start-up, along with her then-husband Jamie Bosworth, a former golf pro and co-founder of the station. In 2014 Lahmers moved to the Fox station in New York City, WNYW-TV, as a general assignments reporter. In 2017 she was promoted to daily co-anchor of the station's early morning news program, Good Day Wake Up, which airs before Good Day New York, along with long-time New York television news reporter Sukanya Krishnan. During that time she also hosted Studio 5, a series of entertainment news specials on WNYW.

In August 2019, Lahmers left WNYW to join the revamped entertainment news program Extra. Lahmers relocated to Los Angeles and began reporting for the show in September 2019. As a correspondent, she conducted sit-down studio interviews, as well as covering high-profile film premieres and red carpet events. This included the 2020 Golden Globe Awards.

In January 2023, Lahmers along with fellow Extra correspondent Melvin Robert joined Good Day L.A., in a likely move to return to local television scene, as well with their reporting for Extra.

== Personal life ==
Lahmers has been an advocate for the prevention of domestic violence since 2009, when Alice Morrin, a close friend and colleague at Fox CT, was murdered by her husband. Lahmers was married to golf pro and cable network executive Jamie Bosworth from 2011 until 2014. In 2017, she dated family medicine physician and internet personality Mikhail Varshavski, better known as Doctor Mike.

On November 17, 2021, Lahmers gave birth to a son, Ethan, with boyfriend Jarod Keller.

== Filmography ==
Television
Year	Title	Role	Notes
2019–2023	Extra	Correspondent/Weekend Anchor	833 episodes
2021	The Other Two	Jennifer Lahmers	Episode: "Chase Goes to College"
2023 -	Good Day L.A.	Morning Anchor	
