= Lynda Lopez =

American journalist (born 1971)

- Born: June 14, 1971 (age 55); The Bronx, New York City, US
- Education: C.W. Post Campus of Long Island University (BA)
- Occupations: Journalist, author
- Children: 1
- Relatives: Jennifer Lopez (sister)

Lynda Lopez (born June 14, 1971) is an American journalist and author based in New York City. She is also a co-founder of Nuyorican Productions, an American production company founded in 2001 with Benny Medina which became active in 2006 with the release of South Beach. Lopez has anchored numerous media platforms. In 2020, Lopez authored the book AOC: The Fearless Rise and Powerful Resonance of Alexandria Ocasio-Cortez, published by St. Martin's Press.

== Early years ==
Lopez was born on June 14, 1971, in the South Bronx and raised in the Castle Hill neighborhood of the Bronx borough within New York City, to Puerto Rican parents. Her mother, Guadalupe Rodríguez, was a kindergarten teacher, and her father, David López, was a computer specialist. She has two older sisters: Leslie Ann, a teacher, and Jennifer, a singer and actress. After graduating from Preston High School in 1989, she enrolled at the C.W. Post Campus of Long Island University, where she majored in broadcasting and communications.

== Career ==
=== Radio broadcasting ===
Lopez started her radio broadcasting career at WBAB and WLIR on Long Island. She later worked for WXXP-FM, also on Long Island, as both Assistant Program Director and Music Director. She then worked as a DJ for WKTU in the 10PM-2AM timeslot. After working for five years in radio, she landed a position as entertainment correspondent for WPIX's morning show.

Lopez was employed by WCBS Radio in Manhattan as a news anchor until August 2013, when she left to work for her sister Jennifer Lopez in Los Angeles. She returned to the station a year later, in the summer of 2014.

In February 2023, Lopez joined all-news WINS-AM/FM in New York City as midday news anchor.

=== Television ===
During the late 1990s and early 2000s, she worked as a VH1 VJ for a short time with Kane and Rebecca Rankin. In 2000, she hosted a special in which she interviewed her sister, Jennifer. The two discussed their childhood as well as Jennifer's rising music career. Some of J-Lo's music videos were played and her then-newest video for "Feelin' So Good" made its VH1 premiere during this special. During this time, Lopez was also the morning news entertainment reporter for the WB11 in New York City, WPIX.

In 2002, she became the host of Style Network's GLOW, a cable TV show dealing with women's beauty issues, while working as an entertainment reporter at the same time. Lopez reported the latest entertainment news and stories on WNBC-TV, cable entertainment TV program E! News Live, and Spanish-language WNJU.

In 2003, Lopez became a DJ for WNEW-FM, with her boyfriend at the time, Chris Booker, a New York disc jockey and correspondent for Entertainment Tonight. In October 2003, she joined WCBS-TV as a part-time correspondent, after their show was canceled at WNEW-FM. In August 2004, Lopez was named anchor of WCBS' weekend morning show, making this her first news-anchor job. For unknown reasons, she had not been presented on-air television since early April 2006, and she officially left the employ of WCBS-TV in June 2006.

=== Co-anchor ===
On July 29, 2006, Lopez debuted as the weekend co-anchor (with Mike Gilliam) on the News Corp-owned WWOR-TV's My 9 Weekend News at 10. They replaced the team of Cathleen Trigg, who departed the station, and Rolland Smith, who retired. Lopez moved to WNYW-TV's Good Day New York in 2007 and anchored Fox 5 Live at 11am. Reid Lamberty joined her as co-anchor for the 5am hour and 11am hour on FOX 5. Lopez was replaced from WNYW-TV's Good Day New York by former CNN Headline News anchor Christina Park, and after returning to WWOR and her previous role she left television news altogether after the station ended weekend newscasts.

== Awards and recognition ==
She won a 2001 New York Emmy Award for Outstanding Single Morning News Program as a co-host for WB 11 Morning News.

== Personal life ==
Lopez was in a relationship with radio/television personality Chris Booker. They met in early 2002 at WNEW-FM in New York City, where they worked as co-hosts for the morning show. The couple separated in early 2005.

In 2008, Lopez had a daughter with her boyfriend Adam Goldfried. She and Goldfried subsequently separated.

== See also ==
- List of Hispanic and Latino Americans
- List of Puerto Ricans
- New Yorkers in journalism
- Nuyorican
