= Ron Corning =

American television host and anchor

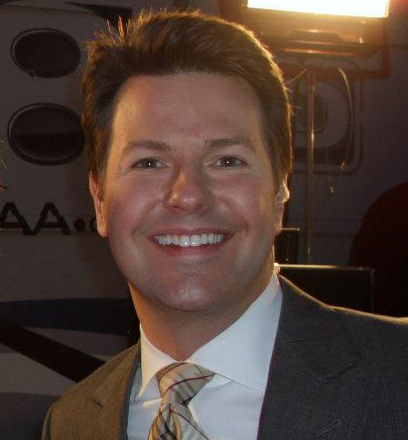
- Born: June 23, 1971 (age 55); Calais, Maine, U.S.
- Education: Wheaton College

Ron Corning (born June 23, 1971) is an American television host. For 8 years he was the morning anchor at the ABC affiliate WFAA in Dallas, Texas. He co-anchored the station's morning newscast, Daybreak, and was the solo anchor of Midday, the station's one-hour noon newscast.

Corning was raised in Calais, Maine, and graduated from Wheaton College in Massachusetts. He began his broadcast career as a general assignment reporter and anchor for WDTV, the CBS affiliate in Bridgeport, West Virginia, and then WBOY, the NBC affiliate in Clarksburg, West Virginia. He was next hired at WTOV in Steubenville, Ohio where he performed similar newscasting duties, before moving to KTVI, the Fox station in St. Louis, Missouri. From there, he went on to the Fox affiliate in Seattle, Washington, KCPQ.

Corning made his jump to the national stage as host and news anchor of The Daily Buzz, a syndicated American morning television show broadcast on many affiliates of UPN and The WB stations (now The CW) across the country.

From 2004 to August 2006, Corning co-anchored World News Now and ABC World News This Morning. In 2006 while at ABC News, People Magazine' named Corning one of the 'Most Beautiful People'. That same year MSN named him one of 'The Best Anchors'.

Corning joined Jodi Applegate as co-anchor of Good Day New York at the flagship FOX-owned affiliate WNYW on August 28, 2006. The station opted to not renew his employment contract while he was on leave for a scheduled vacation in April 2008. to make room for Fox News Channel correspondent Greg Kelly, son of NY Police Commissioner Ray Kelly

On September 17, 2008, Applegate was also released from the station. The two were reunited in November 2009 at Cablevision's News 12 Long Island as evening anchor team. Applegate left News 12 in October 2010.

In April 2011, Corning replaced Chris Flanagan as co-host of WFAA's Daybreak.

Corning left WFAA in March 2019. He has since appeared on podcasts covering pop culture and news events for The Dallas Morning News. Corning launched his own video podcast series titled "Morning After", which, after initially being produced by On-Air Media, was licensed and produced as a daily morning show on Nexstar’s KDAF, the CW affiliate in Dallas-Fort Worth. Corning served as co-host and Executive Producer until April of 2022. He remains a special events contributor for the station, and continues his work for the Dallas Morning News.
