= Alice Gainer =

American journalist

- Born: Alice Gainer
- Education: Fordham University
- Occupation: Journalist
- Title: Anchor/Reporter
- Website: www.cbsnews.com/newyork/personality/alice-gainer/

Alice Gainer is an American anchor and reporter for WCBS-TV and WLNY-TV in New York City. Previously, she co-anchored the News At Nine on CBS2's sister station WLNY, with Dick Brennan. Prior to WCBS Gainer worked at WNYW Fox 5, New York and for eight years before that, worked as an anchor/reporter at News 12 New Jersey. She has also appeared on News 12 Westchester, CNN, Fox News Channel and Fox Business Happy Hour.

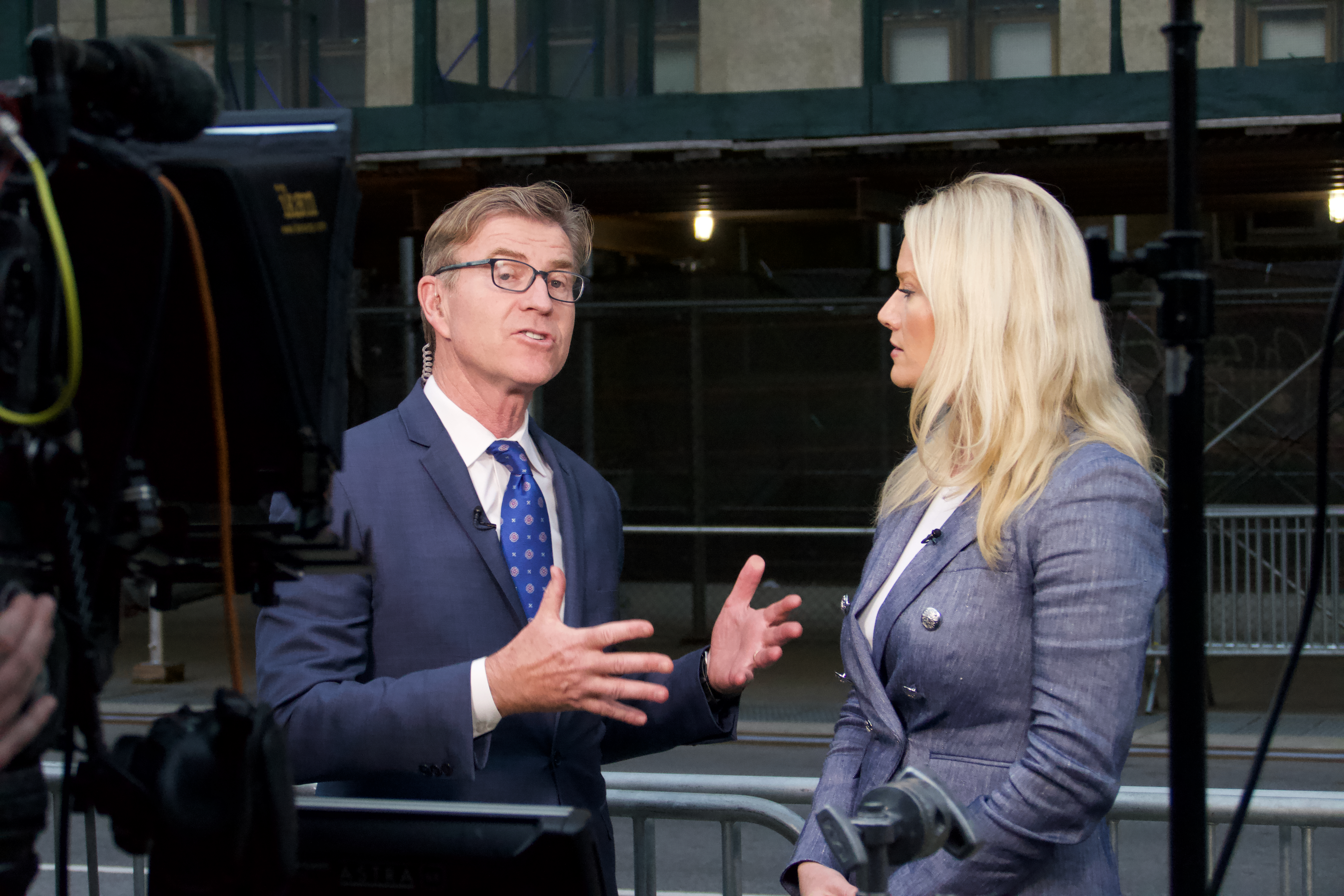
Dick Brennan (left) and Alice Gainer (right)

Raised in Wayne, New Jersey, Gainer graduated in 2000 from Wayne Valley High School and graduated from Fordham University in 2004 with a degree in Communications: TV and Radio and a minor in Business Administration. At Fordham she was an anchor for WFUV, the university's NPR affiliated radio station, and won a Gracie Award in the category "Individual Achievement for Best Anchor (Radio)". She was also an anchor for the campus television station. After graduating Gainer worked for NPR affiliate WBGO radio. and also for MetroNetworks WOR, WABC, and Air America Satellite Radio.

Gainer is the recipient of nine NY Emmy Awards for "Breaking/Spot News", "Crime News", and "Entertainment News" among other categories. She's been nominated more than a dozen times times in the categories "Anchor", "LIVE- reporter", "Spot News", "Entertainment News", "Crime News" and "Health/Science". At the age of 25 and after only 2 years as a television reporter she was nominated for a New York Emmy for "On-Camera Achievement -Live Reporter". She was the recipient of a 2010 1st place Associated Press award for "Best Continuing Coverage". Other awards include a 1st place AP award for "Best Election Coverage" with the WBGO news team and a Public Radio News Directors Incorporated award. She recently received a 2026 New York State Broadcasters Association Excellence in Broadcasting award for "Outstanding Live On-Scene Reporting and in 2019 received a New York State Broadcasters Association Award for "Outstanding Spot News"

She appeared in the movies The Bourne Legacy as an MSNBC anchor "Delivery Man" and "The Week Of". She also appeared as a reporter on the CBS show Bull. Gainer was also a principal actor in a New York Mega Millions commercial where she played a news anchor and has also appeared in several MTV commercials.

Gainer competed for the title of Miss New Jersey USA and placed in the top 15 for several years. She also held the title of Miss Somerset County 2006, in the Miss America Organization. In high school, she was captain of the Varsity swim team and an all-county swimmer. She also played Varsity soccer. At Fordham, she was captain of the nationally competitive dance team. On July 17, 2018, she posted on Twitter that she is engaged to her boyfriend. In 2019 she posted online that they were married. According to court documents, they divorced after six years of marriage.
