= Jim Ryan (reporter) =

American reporter (born 1939)

- Born: James Logan Ryan; August 19, 1939 (age 87)
- Education: Mount Saint Michael Academy
- Occupation: TV news senior anchor
- Notable credit(s): WCBS; WNYW; WNBC

James Logan Ryan (born August 19, 1939) is an American television reporter and anchorman in New York City. He was one of the anchors for Good Day New York on Fox 5 NY.

== Biography ==
Ryan started his broadcast career at WNBC in 1980, eventually becoming an anchor/reporter until he left for WNEW (later WNYW) in 1985. He became the station's political reporter until he began co-anchoring Good Day New York in 1988, a position he held until 2005, when WNYW threw an on-air retirement celebration for him. He was known for often wearing a black leather blazer during the broadcast. A few months later, he was "lured out of retirement" (according to weatherman and friend Dave Price), when he was hired to join the anchor team at CBS 2 News This Morning. Ryan (and the other anchors) were replaced in April 2006 in a major shake-up at WCBS-TV. In the mid-1990s, Ryan also hosted A Current Affair.

On July 19, 2001, Ryan had an on-air argument with Dick Oliver during a segment on a landlord-tenant dispute, an incident that shared many similarities with a series of sketches on Saturday Night Live where cast member Bill Hader would portray elderly reporter "Herb Welch". However, Hader himself later claimed the character originated in the rehearsals for another sketch.

On September 11, 2001, Ryan was anchoring Good Day New York. During a commercial break at 8:48 a.m., WNYW cut to breaking news to show World Trade Center tower one burning. Ryan, Dave Price, and Lyn Brown were anchoring during the attacks that Tuesday morning.

In 2002, he had heart surgery.

In 2005, he retired from Good Day New York.
