= Here's How =

Here's How may refer to:

- Here's How (TV series), a 1946 television series
- Here's How, musical album by Bliss Blood
- Here's Howe, a 1926 Broadway musical
