= WNYW =

Television station in New York City

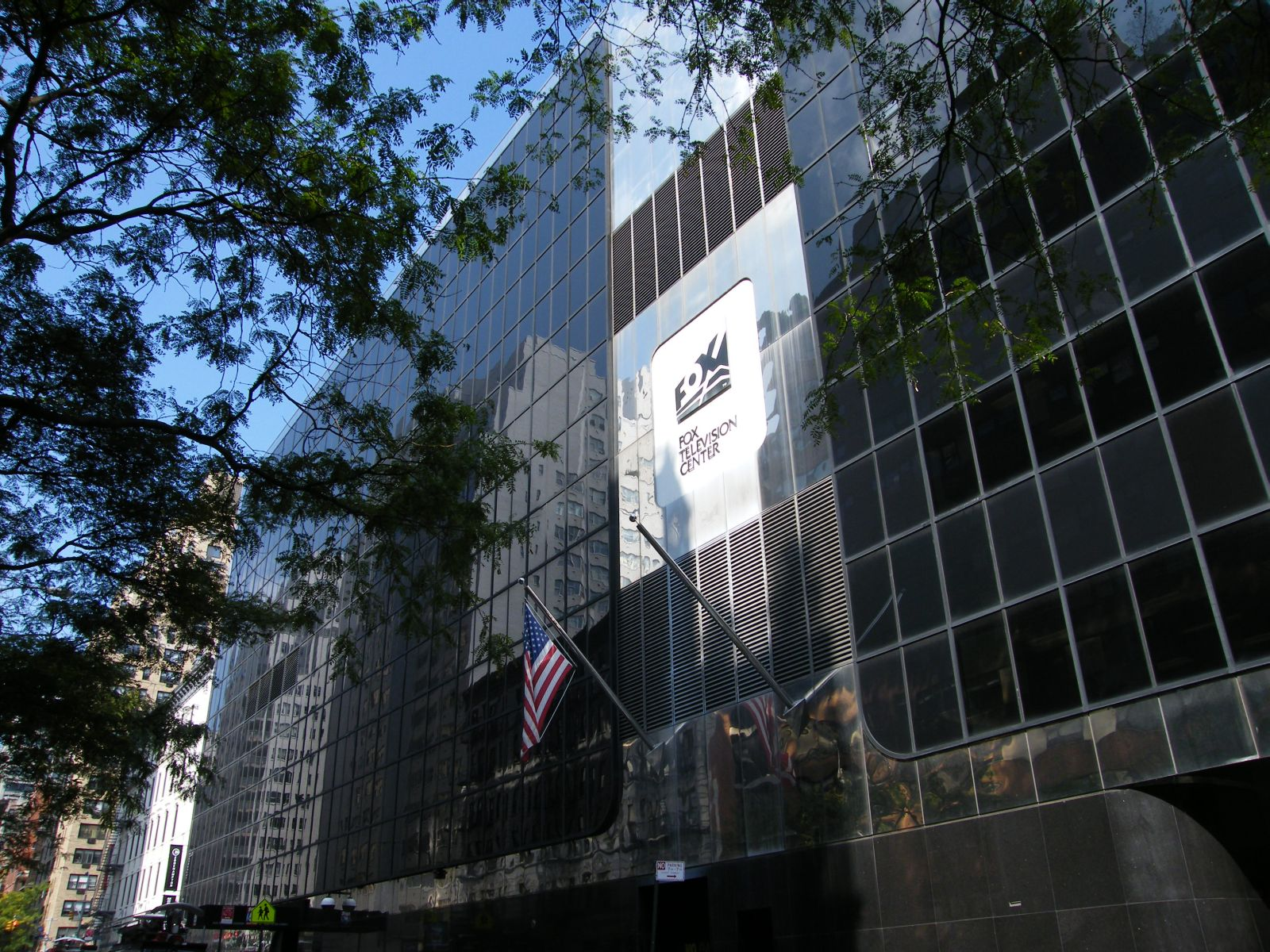
- WNYW's studio, the Fox Television Center on East 67th Street in Manhattan, opened in 1954 as the DuMont Tele-Centre.
- New York, New York; United States
- Channels: Digital: 27 (UHF); Virtual: 5
- Branding: Fox 5 New York; The News On Fox 5

Programming
- Affiliations: 5.1: Fox; for others, see § Subchannels

Ownership
- Owner: Fox Television Stations, LLC
- Sister stations: WWOR-TV

History
- Founded: 1938 as experimental station W2XVT
- First air date: May 2, 1944
- Former call signs: WABD (1944–1958); WNEW-TV (1958–1986)
- Former channel numbers: Analog: 4 (VHF, 1938–1945), 5 (VHF, 1945–2009); Digital: 44 (UHF, 1998–2019); Translator: W64AA Bronx
- Former affiliations: Independent (1944–1946, 1956–1986); DuMont (1946–1956)
- Call sign meaning: disambiguation of former WNEW-TV call sign

Technical information
- Licensing authority: FCC
- Facility ID: 22206
- ERP: 92.8 kW
- HAAT: 496 m (1,627 ft)
- Transmitter coordinates: 40°42′46.8″N 74°0′47.3″W

Links
- Public license information: Public file; LMS
- Website: fox5ny.com

WNYW (channel 5) is a television station in New York City. It is the flagship station of the Fox television network, owned and operated through its Fox Television Stations division. Under common ownership with Secaucus, New Jersey–licensed MyNetworkTV flagship WWOR-TV (channel 9), the two stations share studios at the Fox Television Center on East 67th Street in Manhattan's Lenox Hill neighborhood; WNYW's transmitter is located at One World Trade Center.

== History ==
=== DuMont origins (1944–1956) ===
The station traces its history to 1938, when television set and equipment manufacturer Allen B. DuMont founded experimental station W2XVT in Passaic, New Jersey. That station's call sign was changed to W2XWV when it moved to Manhattan in 1940. On May 2, 1944, the station received its commercial license, the third in New York City and fifth overall in the United States. It began broadcasting on VHF channel 4 as WABD with its call sign made up of DuMont's initials. It was one of the few television stations that continued to broadcast during World War II, making it the fifth-oldest continuously broadcasting commercial station in the United States (after WNBT/WRCA/WNBC, WCBW/WCBS-TV, WPTZ/WRCV/KYW, and WRGB). The station originally had its studios in the DuMont Building at 515 Madison Avenue, with its transmitter tower atop the same building. (The original tower, long abandoned by the station, still remains.) On December 17, 1945, WABD moved to channel 5. WNBT (now WNBC) took over channel 4 the following spring, moving from channel 1, which the FCC was de-allocating from the VHF TV broadcast band. The series Here's How first aired on WABD in 1946.

Soon after channel 5 received its commercial license, DuMont Laboratories began a series of experimental coaxial cable hookups between WABD and W3XWT (now WTTG), a DuMont-owned experimental station in Washington, D.C. These hookups were the beginning of the DuMont Television Network, the world's first licensed commercial television network. (However, NBC was feeding a few programs and special events from its New York station WNBT to outlets in Philadelphia and Schenectady as early as 1940.) DuMont began regular network service in 1946 with WABD as the flagship station. On June 14, 1954, WABD and DuMont moved into the $5 million DuMont Tele-Centre at 205 East 67th Street in Manhattan's Lenox Hill neighborhood, inside the shell of the space formerly occupied by Jacob Ruppert's Central Opera House. Channel 5 is still headquartered in the same building, which was later renamed the Metromedia TeleCenter, and is now known as the Fox Television Center.

By February 1955, DuMont realized it could not continue in network television. In most cities around the U.S., NBC and CBS had secured affiliations with the top TV stations, making it difficult for DuMont shows to develop an audience and attract advertising dollars. DuMont decided to shut down the network's operations and run WABD and Washington station WTTG as independent stations. DuMont had previously sold WDTV in Pittsburgh to the locally based Westinghouse Electric Corporation, arguably hastening DuMont's demise. WABD thus became the New York market's fourth independent station, alongside WOR-TV (channel 9), WPIX (channel 11) and Newark-licensed WATV (channel 13).

After DuMont wound down network operations in August 1955, DuMont Laboratories spun off WABD and WTTG into a new firm, the DuMont Broadcasting Corporation. Channel 5 gained a sister station in 1957, when DuMont purchased WNEW (1130 AM, now WBBR) in April of that year. The deal also included a Federal Communications Commission (FCC) construction permit for an FM radio station, which went on the air as 102.7 WNEW-FM when it began operations in August 1958.

=== The Metromedia era (1957–1986) ===
In May 1958, DuMont Broadcasting changed its name to the Metropolitan Broadcasting Corporation to distinguish itself from its former corporate parent. Four months later, on September 7, 1958, WABD's call letters were changed to WNEW-TV to match its radio sisters. The final major corporate transaction involving the station during 1958 occurred in December. Washington-based investor John Kluge acquired Paramount Pictures' controlling interest in Metropolitan Broadcasting and appointed himself as the company's chairman. Metropolitan Broadcasting began expanding its holdings across the United States, and changed its corporate name to Metromedia in 1961. However, the Metropolitan Broadcasting name was retained for Metromedia's TV and radio station properties until 1967.

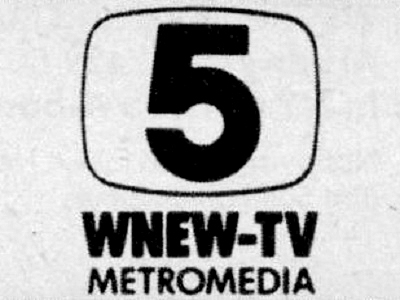
Final logo as WNEW-TV, used from 1984 to 1986.

In the early 1960s, WNEW-TV was a leader in producing local children's shows. They included Romper Room (until 1966, when it moved to WOR-TV), The Sandy Becker Show and The Sonny Fox Show, which was later known as Wonderama. Bob McAllister took over hosting Wonderama in 1967 and by 1970 it was syndicated to the other Metromedia stations. WNEW-TV also originated The Jerry Lewis MDA Labor Day Telethon in 1966, and broadcast the program annually until 1986 when it moved to future sister station WWOR-TV, where it aired through 2012. In the early 1960s, the educational series Columbia Lectures in International Studies was shown on early weekday mornings, before Sandy Becker, and was distributed to other Metromedia stations. The station also aired cultural programs such as Festival of the Performing Arts. However, the station's prime time schedule during those years was dominated by reruns of recently concluded crime dramas such as Peter Gunn, Outlaws, and the 1950s edition of Dragnet, bringing the station some criticism for overly violent programming. In the 1970s, and early 1980s, local programming also included a weekly public affairs show hosted by Gabe Pressman, the New York edition of PM Magazine, and Midday Live, a daily talk/information show hosted by Lee Leonard, and later by Bill Boggs. The station also carried movies, cartoons, off-network sitcoms, drama series and a prime time nightly newscast at 10 pm.

By the 1970s, channel 5 was one of the strongest independent stations in the country. Despite WOR-TV's and WPIX's eventual status as national superstations, WNEW-TV was the highest-rated independent in New York. From the early 1970s to the late 1980s, channel 5 was available as a regional superstation in large portions of the Northeastern United States, including most of Upstate New York, and sections of eastern Pennsylvania, southern New England, and the Philadelphia market portion of New Jersey.

=== The Fox era (1986–present) ===
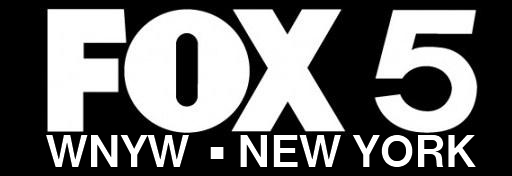
WNYW's secondary on-air logo since 2012

On May 4, 1985, Rupert Murdoch's News Corporation, which had recently bought a controlling interest in the 20th Century Fox film studio, announced its purchase of Metromedia's six independent television stations, including WNEW-TV. In the interim between the announcement and the buyout, Metromedia references were largely phased out of channel 5's branding. Upon taking control nearly one year later, on March 7, 1986, channel 5's call sign was changed slightly to the present WNYW. The change was made due to an FCC rule in place (no longer in effect) that prohibited television and radio stations with different ownership from sharing the same call sign. Along with the other former Metromedia independent stations, WNYW formed the cornerstone of the Fox Broadcasting Company when it launched on October 9, 1986.

WNYW's schedule initially changed very little, as Fox aired programming only on late nights and weekends on two nights of the week in the network's first few years. It was not until 1993 that Fox began broadcasting a full seven nights' worth of programming. Although it began taking on the look of a network-owned station in the fall of 1986, channel 5 continued to carry decades-old syndicated cartoons, sitcoms and films into the late 1980s.

Murdoch had one local obstacle to overcome before his purchase of channel 5 could become final. News Corporation had owned the New York Post since 1976 and the FCC's media ownership rules barred common ownership of newspapers and broadcast licenses in the same media market. The FCC granted Murdoch a temporary waiver to keep the Post and WNYW to allow News Corporation to complete its purchase of the Metromedia television stations. News Corporation sold the New York Post in 1988, but bought the paper back five years later with a permanent waiver of the cross-ownership rules.

In late summer 1986, WNYW debuted the nightly newsmagazine A Current Affair, one of the first shows to be labeled as a "tabloid television" program. Originally a local program, it was first anchored by Maury Povich, formerly of Washington sister station WTTG. (He also briefly anchored WNYW's evening newscasts.) Within a year of its launch, A Current Affair was syndicated to the other Fox-owned stations. In 1988, the series entered into national syndication, where it remained until the original incarnation of the program was cancelled in 1996. On August 1, 1988, the station dropped its weekday morning cartoons in favor of a local news and information program titled Good Day New York, which continues to this day.

Following the launch of the Fox network, WNYW lost much of its out-of-market superstation reach, as most markets in the Northeast had their own Fox affiliates. WNYW continued to be seen on cable in the Binghamton metropolitan area and the New York side of the Plattsburgh–Burlington market until the late 1990s, when WICZ-TV and WFFF-TV joined the network.

In 2001, Fox bought BHC Communications, a television station group owned by Chris-Craft Industries, which effectively created a duopoly between WNYW and its former rival, WWOR-TV. In autumn 2001, WNYW dropped Fox Kids' weekday block and moved it to WWOR-TV, where it ran for a few more months before Fox discontinued the network's weekday children's lineup at the end of that year. In 2004, Fox Television Stations announced that it would move WWOR's operations from Secaucus to WNYW's facility at the Fox Television Center in Manhattan. While some office functions were merged, plans for a full move to Manhattan were abandoned later that year due to pressure from New Jersey Congressman Steve Rothman (whose congressional district includes Secaucus) and Senator Frank Lautenberg on the grounds that any move to Manhattan would violate the conditions of WWOR's broadcast license. The company also considered moving WNYW's operations to Secaucus, but ultimately decided to remain in the Fox Television Center.

On September 11, 2001, the transmitter facilities of WNYW, eight other New York City television stations, and several radio stations, were destroyed when two hijacked airplanes crashed into and destroyed the north and south towers of the World Trade Center. The station relocated to an antenna located atop the Empire State Building, where its transmitter facilities had been located until they were moved to the World Trade Center in the 1970s. By the late 2010s, the transmitter returned to the newly built One World Trade Center. In April 2006, WNYW became the first Fox-owned to launch a website on Fox Interactive Media's "MyFox" platform, which featured expanded content, more videos and new community features such as blogs and photo galleries. The MyFox sites were later outsourced to WorldNow, and later Lakana beginning in 2015, after which the "MyFox" brand was discontinued.

On October 15, 2010, News Corporation pulled the signals of WNYW, WWOR, along with co-owned cable channels Fox Business Network, Fox Deportes, and National Geographic Wild from Cablevision systems in the New York television market area, due to a dispute between Fox and Cablevision. Cablevision claimed News Corporation had demanded $150 million a year to renew its carriage of 12 Fox-owned channels, including those removed due to the dispute. Cablevision offered to submit to binding arbitration on October 14, 2010. News Corporation rejected Cablevision's proposal, stating that it would "reward Cablevision for refusing to negotiate fairly". WWOR, WNYW and the three cable channels were restored on October 30, 2010, when Cablevision and News Corporation struck a new carriage deal.

After News Corporation split into two companies on June 28, 2013, spinning off its publishing assets (including the New York Post) into a new News Corp, WNYW became part of 21st Century Fox. On December 14, 2017, The Walt Disney Company, owner of ABC owned-and-operated station WABC-TV (channel 7), announced its intent to buy the assets of 21st Century Fox for $66.1 billion, pending regulatory approval. The sale did not include the Fox network, MyNetworkTV, WNYW, WWOR, the Fox Television Stations unit or any other broadcast assets, since that would be illegal under FCC rules prohibiting a merger between any of the four major networks. Ownership was transferred to a new company called Fox Corporation, a split officially completed on March 18, 2019.

In the fall of 2018, after WWOR's license was renewed, and several months after the repeal of the FCC's main studio rule (which required WWOR to operate from New Jersey as a license condition), Fox Television Stations sold its former Secaucus studios to Hartz Mountain Industries for $4.05 million, and consolidated WWOR's operations with WNYW at the Fox Television Center.

== Programming ==
=== Locally-produced programming ===
In 1966, WNEW produced the first edition of The Jerry Lewis MDA Labor Day Telethon, initially as a charity event seen exclusively on WNEW. In 1968, the telethon expanded to a network of six stations in the Northeastern United States, which was dubbed the Love Network, with WNEW serving as flagship. The station produced local segments for the program, which were broadcast on the Sunday night before through the evening of Labor Day, from 1966 until 1986. The telethon moved to future sister station WWOR-TV in 1987 where it aired until 2012 when it became a reduced-length special known as the MDA Show of Strength. The telethon moved to ABC as a national broadcast in 2013 until its final telecast in 2014.

In 1980, the station began producing one minute vignettes entitled Big Apple Minute featuring the station's on-air team touring New York City-area attractions. These lasted until 1987, following the station's acquisition by Fox and the call letter change in 1986. The station also produced the New York City version of PM Magazine from 1980 until 1988 when it was transferred to WWOR where it was called PM. It was renamed Evening Magazine (a name generally reserved for Group W-owned stations) and aired until its cancellation in 1989.

The station also broadcast the Puerto Rican Day Parade from 2006 until 2015.

Chasing New Jersey was a daily program featuring segments and stories focusing on headlines and issues affecting the New Jersey area. The show was produced by Fairfax Productions, and ran from July 8, 2013, to June 18, 2020, on sister station WWOR-TV. WNYW ran the show in the overnight hours.

Good Day Street Talk is a weekly community affairs program hosted by Antwan Lewis.

=== Sports programming ===
Through its network's sporting division, WNYW has televised major sporting championships featuring New York teams in the past years. As part of the network's coverage of the National Hockey League in 1995, the station televised games one and four of the Stanley Cup Finals when the New Jersey Devils won their first Stanley Cup.

From 1999 to 2001, WNYW held the broadcast rights to New York Yankees game telecasts, displacing longtime broadcaster WPIX. Under the initial deal, WNYW and actual rights holder the Madison Square Garden Network carried Yankees games until 2001. Broadcasts of the team's games were moved to the new YES Network through a joint arrangement with WCBS-TV. This lasted until the 2004 season; WWOR-TV took over the broadcasts beginning in 2005. WNYW continues to show Yankees games through Fox's national broadcast contract with Major League Baseball; through this package, the station aired the Yankees' World Series victories in 1996, 1998, 2000 and 2009 and their other appearances in 2001, 2003, and 2024. As of 2022, WNYW is the only broadcast station to carry Yankees games, as rights for games formerly shown by WPIX were sold to Amazon. It also airs any Mets games that are featured on Fox's MLB coverage, in that capacity broadcasting the aforementioned 2000 World Series in which they lost to the cross-town Yankees, and 2015 World Series in which they lost out to the Kansas City Royals.

Since the network established its sports division in 1994, most sporting events carried on channel 5 have been provided through Fox Sports. At that time, the network acquired partial television rights to the NFL and primary rights to the NFC. As a result of this, the station became the unofficial "home" station of the New York Giants airing select telecasts. Among the notable Giants games aired on the station is the team's victory in Super Bowl XLII, when the Giants ended their 17-year title drought by defeating the New England Patriots, who were 18–0 at the time and were one win away from the second perfect season in NFL history. In addition, beginning with the 2018 season, the station aired the team's Thursday night games as part of its newly acquired Thursday Night Football package that it shares with NFL Network (along with Thursday night Jets games) until the 2021 season. Currently, Giants games are rotated between WCBS-TV (through the NFL on CBS), WABC-TV (Monday Night Football), WPIX (Monday Night Football (if WABC-TV is not airing them)), and WNBC (through NBC Sunday Night Football). The station also airs at least two games involving the Jets each year—usually whenever they play an NFC opponent at home. Since 2014, more Jets' games can be shown on WNYW as part of the NFL's new "cross-flex" broadcast rules.

WNYW also provided local coverage of Super Bowl XLVIII and the 2026 FIFA World Cup final which were played at MetLife Stadium.

On March 12, 2024, it was announced that WNYW and WWOR would become the new broadcast partner for the New York Liberty.

=== News operation ===
Fox 5 News at 10:00 pm news open, used from November 2012 until July 7, 2019.

WNYW broadcasts 64 1/2 hours of locally produced newscasts each week (with 12 hours each weekday, 2 1/2 hours on Saturdays and two hours on Sundays). As is standard with Fox stations that carry early evening weekend newscasts, WNYW's Saturday and Sunday 6 pm newscasts are subject to delay or preemption due to network sports coverage. WNYW and sister station WWOR-TV share resources with Philadelphia sister station WTXF-TV in areas of New Jersey in which the New York and Philadelphia markets overlap; the stations share reporters for stories occurring in New Jersey counties served by both markets.

In 1944, the first newscast for Channel 5 was Late Night News. In 1945, the news department of Channel 5 rebranded its newscast as TV5 Late Report, and rebranded it again as TV5 24 Hours from 1962 to March 10, 1967.

The station is home to one of America's longest-running primetime local newscasts: WNYW (as WNEW-TV) first premiered its 10 pm newscast—the first primetime newscast in the New York market—on March 13, 1967. Each night, the newscast (originally known as The 10 O'Clock News until 2001 and currently in use since 2021) is preceded by the simple, but now well-known announcement: "It's 10 pm Do you know where your children are?", which was originally spoken by Mel Epstein, WNEW-TV's director of on-air promotions, and later by staff announcer Tom Gregory (this announcement continues to be shown before the newscast); other television stations in the country began using the tagline for their own 10 pm (or 11 pm) news (which may depend on the start of the local youth curfew in each market). Celebrities were often used to read the slogan in the 1980s, and for a time in the late 1970s, the station added a warmer announcement earlier in the day: "It's 6 pm, have you hugged your child today?" From 1975 to 1985, the 10 pm newscast notably featured nightly op-ed debates which pitted conservative Martin Abend against liberal Professor Sidney Offit.

In the early 1970s, the news department launched its 30-minute program Sports Extra, airing at 10:30 pm on Sundays; where it continues to air. The first time WNEW programmed news outside its established 10 pm slot was in 1985, when it premiered the short-lived First Edition News, a half-hour midday newscast anchored by Jim Ryan (formerly of WNBC) and Judy Licht, serving as a lead-in to Midday Live with Bill Boggs; not long after the program moved to noon with Midday at 12:30 pm.

After the buyout from Murdoch went through, the station began to intensify their news efforts. It first premiered a half-hour 7 pm newscast, simply known as Fox News at Seven, in 1988; the program was canceled in 1993. On August 1, 1988, WNYW became the first Fox station to run a weekday morning newscast with the debut of the two-hour Good Day New York; within five years of its launch, the program became the top-rated morning show in the New York City market. In 1991, a new and eventually very popular music package was composed for the show by Edd Kalehoff, a New York-based composer best known for composing the themes and music cues for game shows such as The Price Is Right. Since the Fox takeover, WNYW's newscasts have become more tabloid in style and have been fodder for jokes, even to the point of being parodied on Saturday Night Live. The consumer reporting segment The Problem Solvers has received the same treatment on The Daily Show.

WNYW was the first broadcast station to cover the terrorist attacks on the World Trade Center that occurred on September 11, 2001. The station interrupted a commercial break at 8:48 am. ET to deliver the first public report of the attacks on air by anchor Jim Ryan and reporter Dick Oliver. WNYW donated a digitized copy of this coverage to the Internet Archive in July 2012. In 2002, WNYW brought early evening newscasts back to the station with the launch of a 90-minute weekday news block from 5 pm to 6:30 pm. Longtime anchor John Roland, a 35-year veteran of channel 5, retired from the station on June 4, 2004; former NBC News correspondent Len Cannon, who joined WNYW as a reporter and anchor some time earlier, was initially named as Roland's replacement. Several months later, veteran New York City anchorman Ernie Anastos (who at the time was anchoring at WCBS-TV) signed a multi-year contract with WNYW, displacing Cannon as lead anchor; Cannon asked for, and was granted, a release from his contract with the station shortly after Anastos's contract deal was announced. Anastos joined WNYW in July 2005, and Cannon joined KHOU-TV in Houston as its lead anchor in the spring of 2006. On April 3, 2006, WNYW debuted a new set, theme music and graphics package, and introduced a new logo based on the on-air look first adopted by Tampa sister station WTVT that became standard for all of Fox's owned-and-operated stations.

On November 9, 2008, WNYW became the fifth New York City television station to begin broadcasting its local newscasts in high definition. On July 13, 2009, Good Day New York expanded with the addition of a fifth hour of the program from 9 am to 10 am; the noon newscast was dropped in turn. In the fall of 2009, WNYW entered into a Local News Service agreement with NBC owned-and-operated station WNBC to share helicopter footage with that station; WNYW's helicopter SkyFox HD was renamed "Chopper 5" on-air, though the SkyFox name was reinstated in 2010, while the name "Chopper 4" continued to be used by WNBC. The LNS agreement ended in 2012 when WNBC began operating its own helicopter; WNYW has since entered into a helicopter-sharing agreement with CBS-owned WCBS-TV.

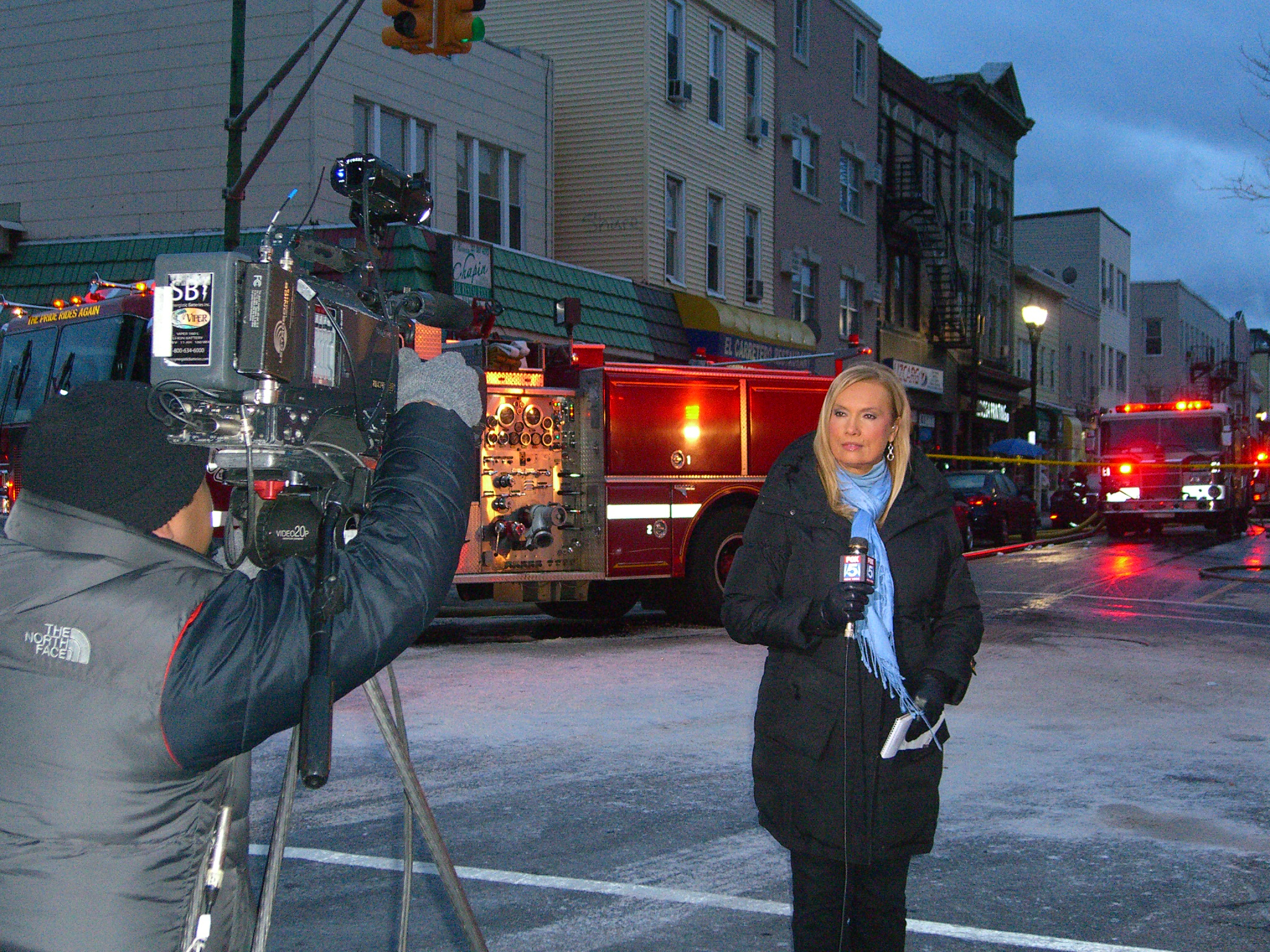
Fox 5 reporter Lisa Evers reporting on a January 2012 fire in Union City, New Jersey.

During the 10 pm newscast on September 16, 2009, anchor Ernie Anastos cursed live on-air while engaging in banter with chief meteorologist Nick Gregory, saying "I guess it takes a tough man to make a tender forecast", adding "keep fucking that chicken"; the incident gained some notoriety when it and other videos of the on-air gaffe appeared on YouTube, making Anastos and WNYW the subject of a joke on ABC's Jimmy Kimmel Live! Anastos apologized for the incident on the following night's 10 pm newscast.

On June 5, 2014, WNYW relaunched its 6 pm newscast as a more topical, interactive program; on June 6, the station launched the entertainment, lifestyle and music program Friday Night Live (airing during the timeslot normally occupied by the second half-hour of the 10 pm newscast). This was followed by the June 7 debut of hourly news updates that air weekend mornings between 9 am and noon (WNYW is the only news-producing English language network O&O in the New York City market that does not carry a full-fledged local newscast on Saturday and/or Sunday mornings, and is one of two Fox owned-and-operated stations without a weekend morning newscast, alongside KTTV in Los Angeles).

As of January 2021, WNYW is the only news-producing station in the New York City market that continues to present field video in widescreen standard definition; all of the other stations broadcast all or most of their field video in high definition.

==== Notable current on-air staff ====
- Tina Cervasio – sports anchor
- Lisa Evers – general assignment reporter
- Nick Gregory (AMS Seal of Approval) – chief meteorologist (1986–present)
- Audrey Puente (member, AMS; member, NWA) – meteorologist
- Rosanna Scotto – anchor (1986–present)

==== Notable former on-air staff ====
- Andy Adler (2007–2010)
- Vanessa Alfano
- Ernie Anastos – anchor (2005–2020)
- Tex Antoine (1978)
- Jodi Applegate
- Julie Banderas
- Sandy Becker
- Bill Boggs (1975–1986)
- Dick Brennan
- Jack Cafferty (1989–1992)
- Julie Chang (2008–2012)
- Ti-Hua Chang
- Ron Claiborne (1982–1986)
- Ron Corning
- Penny Crone
- Andrea Day (1997–2011)
- Arnold Díaz (2008–2014)
- Gordon Elliott (1987–1990s)
- Carter Evans
- Frank Field (1995–1997)
- Rick Folbaum (2006–2009)
- Sonny Fox
- Chris Gailus (2003–2006)
- Anna Gilligan (2013–2016)
- Dr. Max Gomez
- Stacy-Ann Gooden
- Tom Gregory
- Pablo Guzmán
- Donna Hanover
- Juliet Huddy
- Don Imus
- Dennis James (first on-air host)
- Mike Jerrick
- Bill Jorgensen (1967–1979)
- Greg Kelly (2008–2017)
- Marvin Kitman
- Sukanya Krishnan (2017–2019)
- Matt Lauer
- Lee Leonard (mid-1970s)
- Judy Licht
- Lynda Lopez
- Felipe Luciano
- Carol Martin
- Bill Mazer
- Bob McAllister
- Chuck McCann
- Curt Menefee – anchor (1995–2000, 2024–2025)
- Cora-Ann Mihalik
- John Miller
- Myles Miller
- Heather Nauert
- Jill Nicolini
- Dick Oliver
- Christina Park
- Maury Povich
- Gabe Pressman
- Dave Price
- Shimon Prokupecz
- Gene Rayburn
- Victor Riesel
- Bobby Rivers
- Jim Ryan
- Roxie Roker
- John Roland (1969–2004)
- Ken Rosato (2002–2003)
- Soupy Sales
- Cynthia Santana (1996–2001)
- Baruch Shemtov (2014–2019)
- Toni Senecal
- Rolland Smith
- Lou Steele
- Lori Stokes – anchor (2017–2022)
- Teresa Strasser
- David Susskind
- Mike Wallace

== In popular culture ==
WNYW was portrayed in an episode of the Fox animated comedy Futurama, titled "When Aliens Attack", in which the station was accidentally knocked off the air by Philip J. Fry in 1999. That resulted in angry Omicronians invading Earth in the year 3000 (having received the broadcast signal 1,000 years later, being 1,000 light-years away) and demanding to see the end of an Ally McBeal-esque program called Single Female Lawyer.

Anthony Griffin, a 44-year-old Bronx freestyle rapper, used the stage name "Fox 5". He would later become the perpetrator in the 2026 Grand Central Terminal machete attack.

== Technical information ==
=== Subchannels ===
The station's signal is multiplexed:

Subchannels of WNYW
Subchannel	Res.	Short name	Programming
5.1	720p	WNYW	Fox
5.2	480i	Movies!	
5.3	480i	Weather	Fox Weather
5.4	480i	ROAR	Roar
5.5	480i	Catchy	Catchy Comedy

=== Analog-to-digital conversion ===
WNYW discontinued regular programming on its analog signal, over VHF channel 5, at 11:59 pm ET on June 12, 2009, as part of the federally mandated transition from analog to digital television; the shutdown occurred during the closing credits of a syndicated rerun of The Simpsons. The station's digital signal remained on its pre-transition UHF channel 44, using virtual channel 5. It carried WWOR's programming on digital subchannel 5.2 until 2009, when it changed the PSIP data to identify the virtual channel carrying WWOR's programming to 9.2. As of 2019, a channel of WWOR's programming is no longer multiplexed with WNYW.

== See also ==
- Media in New York City
- New Yorkers in journalism
