= Jodi Applegate =

American broadcast journalist

- Born: May 2, 1964 (age 62); Wheeling, West Virginia, U.S.
- Other name: Jodi Applegate Kay (married name)
- Occupation: Broadcast journalist
- Years active: 1982–present
- Known for: WPXI, Pittsburgh; WPIX, New York City; WNYW, New York City; MSNBC; NBC News
- Spouse(s): Rob Nikoleski (divorced) Michael Kay (m. 2011)
- Children: 2

Jodi Applegate (born May 2, 1964) is an American broadcast journalist. She served as an anchorwoman at local stations as well as nationally for MSNBC and NBC News.

== Life and career ==
Applegate was raised in Moon Township, Pennsylvania, a suburb of Pittsburgh, in an Irish American Catholic family. In 1982, Applegate graduated from Moon Area High School. She spent her freshman year at Temple University in Philadelphia. She transferred as a sophomore to New York University, where she received a degree in television and film.

Before turning to newscasting, Applegate briefly worked as an actress. In 1986, she appeared in a television version of the classic children's book A Pocket for Corduroy as the mother. In 1987, Applegate appeared in a television version of the Mercer Mayer children's book There's a Nightmare in My Closet, also as the main character's mother.

In the early 1990s, Applegate was a host of Close Up on C-SPAN, a weekly public affairs program that featured a high school student audience. She later worked as a radio and television traffic reporter for Metro Traffic in San Francisco. From 1993 to 1996, Applegate hosted Good Morning Arizona on KTVK in Phoenix. Applegate was also an anchor at KTVN in Reno, NV. In Reno is where Applegate met Rob Nikoleski, who was the sports news director at a competing Reno station, KOLO. They eventually married, but divorced after eight years. In 2006, while married to Nikoleski, Applegate had gotten pregnant but suffered a miscarriage.

In 1996, Applegate was the first face seen on the cable network MSNBC at the station's launch. She anchored MSNBC Live and Weekend Today on the main NBC network. She also filled in as a substitute host on the Today show. In late 1999, she hosted Later Today with Florence Henderson and Asha Blake. The show was canceled in 2000.

In mid-2001, Applegate joined WFXT in Boston. She anchored the short-lived Fox 25 News at 4:30 newscast then moved to 5:00 by early 2002. She anchored the Fox 25 Morning News for about a year from September 2003, then moved to New York sister station WNYW in October 2004.

As of May 2020, Applegate has been seen hosting infomercials for Westmore Beauty Body Coverage.

=== Career in New York City ===
Applegate joined WNYW as co-anchor of the station's morning program, Good Day New York, in 2005. She remained there for three years and was replaced in the role by Rosanna Scotto in 2008. Applegate left the station shortly thereafter. On May 28, 2008, Applegate made a one time only appearance in the Broadway musical Chicago.

In 2009, Applegate began work as a fill-in anchor on all-news WCBS radio. She also guest-hosted Living Today on Sirius XM Radio's Martha Stewart Living Radio channel, filling in for another former Good Day New York anchor, Mario Bosquez. Applegate also guest-hosted radio talk shows hosted by Joan Hamburg on WOR in New York, and Howie Carr on WRKO in Boston.

Applegate made a return to television news in September 2009 when she joined News 12 Long Island as an evening co-anchor. With three months remaining in her one-year contract, she was allowed to leave News 12 in order to join WPIX. The Tribune Company-owned station named her as sole anchor of its revamped 10:00 PM newscasts on weeknights; she started in that capacity on October 11, 2010. Applegate also anchored the station's hour-long 5:00 PM newscast, which was launched in the fall of 2011.

=== Personal life ===
Applegate married New York Yankees television broadcaster Michael Kay on February 12, 2011, in New York City. The ceremony took place at the Plaza Hotel and was officiated by former New York mayor, Rudolph Giuliani.

On November 21, 2012, it was announced that Applegate was expecting a baby, which was conceived by way of a gestational surrogate. She subsequently announced her departure from WPIX. Applegate left WPIX on December 19, 2012. In January 2013, her daughter, Caledonia, was born. In November 2014, her son, Charles, was born.

She and her family reside in Greenwich, Connecticut.
