= Dave Price =

American journalist and meteorologist

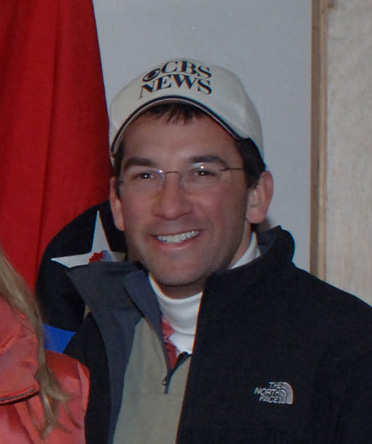
- Price in 2006
- Born: David M. Price; October 18, 1966 (age 59); Poughkeepsie, New York, U.S.
- Education: BSILR (1987); MA
- Alma mater: Cornell University; Columbia University
- Known for: Weather Anchor for CBS's The Early Show
- Spouse(s): Jacqueline Klinger (m. 2010–present)

David M. Price (born October 18, 1966) is an American journalist and weather forecaster who is currently working for WNBC-TV in New York as a weekday afternoon weatherman.

Price is perhaps best known for his time on CBS television's The Early Show, where he was the daily forecaster and a primary fill-in co-host for Harry Smith. He was the co-host and weatherman for Fox 5 WNYW's Good Day New York from 1999-2003. In 2012, he was brought back to replace Greg Kelly as Rosanna Scotto's co-anchor, as Kelly was promoted to replace Ernie Anastos as the station's lead anchor for its evening newscasts. In January 2013, Price was replaced by Greg Kelly, and he left the station.

== Early years ==
Price began his professional career as a corporate human resources executive. After working for eight years in the corporate world, he began his broadcasting career at WSEE-TV in Erie, Pennsylvania as a morning and noon weathercaster.

== Career ==
From 1996 to 1998, he worked for CBS affiliate WBBM-TV in Chicago as morning weather anchor and feature reporter. From 1998 to 1999, he served as the host of Fox WTXF-TV's morning show Good Day Philadelphia. From 1999 to 2003, he worked as a weatherman/co-host for WNYW-TV/Fox 5 in New York City; for his final eight months, he worked as a feature reporter for the syndicated program Good Day Live.

Before Price came to The Early Show in 2003, he guest-starred as a consumer that was stranded during a robbery on Yes, Dear. He also made a cameo in the 2005 episode "Gorilla Warfare" on the sitcom The King of Queens. In 2003, Price joined CBS News' The Early Show as a weather anchor and reporter replacing Mark McEwen. He also was the weather anchor for CBS 2 News This Morning on WCBS-TV in New York until 2006. He occasionally filled in for Harry Smith on The Early Show. After Bob Barker announced his retirement from The Price Is Right late in 2006, Price auditioned as a replacement. Despite not getting the job there, he did host a week of shows on Who Wants to Be a Millionaire for the week of March 3–7, 2008.

On June 28, 2012, it was announced that Dave Price would be returning to Good Day New York as a co-anchor along with Rosanna Scotto starting July 2, 2012. He was quoted by Newsday as saying "The chance to rejoin Fox 5 and be a part of the ‘Good Day New York’ family again was one I couldn't pass up. I've been friends with Rosanna [Scotto] forever and to be honest—it's tough to get a table at Fresco—so this will help a lot. I can't wait to start the day with our viewers and provide all the news and information they need and maybe a few smiles and laughs each morning, too. It doesn't get much better than this. I'm raring to go.”

Price left the show abruptly on January 24, 2013, announcing his departure at the end of the broadcast. Reports conflict as to the reason for his exit, but all agree that he requested to be let out of his contract. Some sources claimed he was to be moved to the earlier 4:30 - 7AM news broadcast, as former Good Day anchor Greg Kelly was to be returned to his former position, his brief stint as evening news anchor having ended. Price was against the move, and asked to be let out of his contract.

Price released a statement saying: “I had a great experience returning to Fox 5 but it is time to look for opportunities outside WNYW. I love [co-host] Rosanna [Scotto] and the gang and wish them all the best.”

On August 27, 2015, Price appeared on WNBC's Today in New York morning newscast doing the weather. On August 31 and on September 2, 2015, he appeared on WNBC's "News 4 New York at Noon" doing the weather. After this, Dave Price became a WNBC weathercaster for the News 4 New York at Noon. He also did fill-ins for the morning and evening newscasts, as well as for NBC's The Today Show.

=== Education ===
Price graduated from Poughkeepsie High School in 1983 and graduated from Cornell University with a Bachelor of Science degree in Industrial and Labor Relations in 1987, and from Columbia University with a master's degree in organizational psychology.

== Personal life ==
Price married Jacqueline Klinger on August 6, 2010 in a Jewish ceremony at their home in Connecticut. They live on the Upper East Side. When his wife went into labor with their first son, Price left for the hospital in the middle of an interview on Good Day New York with Mandy Patinkin, who later sent the family a silver kiddush cup engraved with his son’s name and a handwritten note.

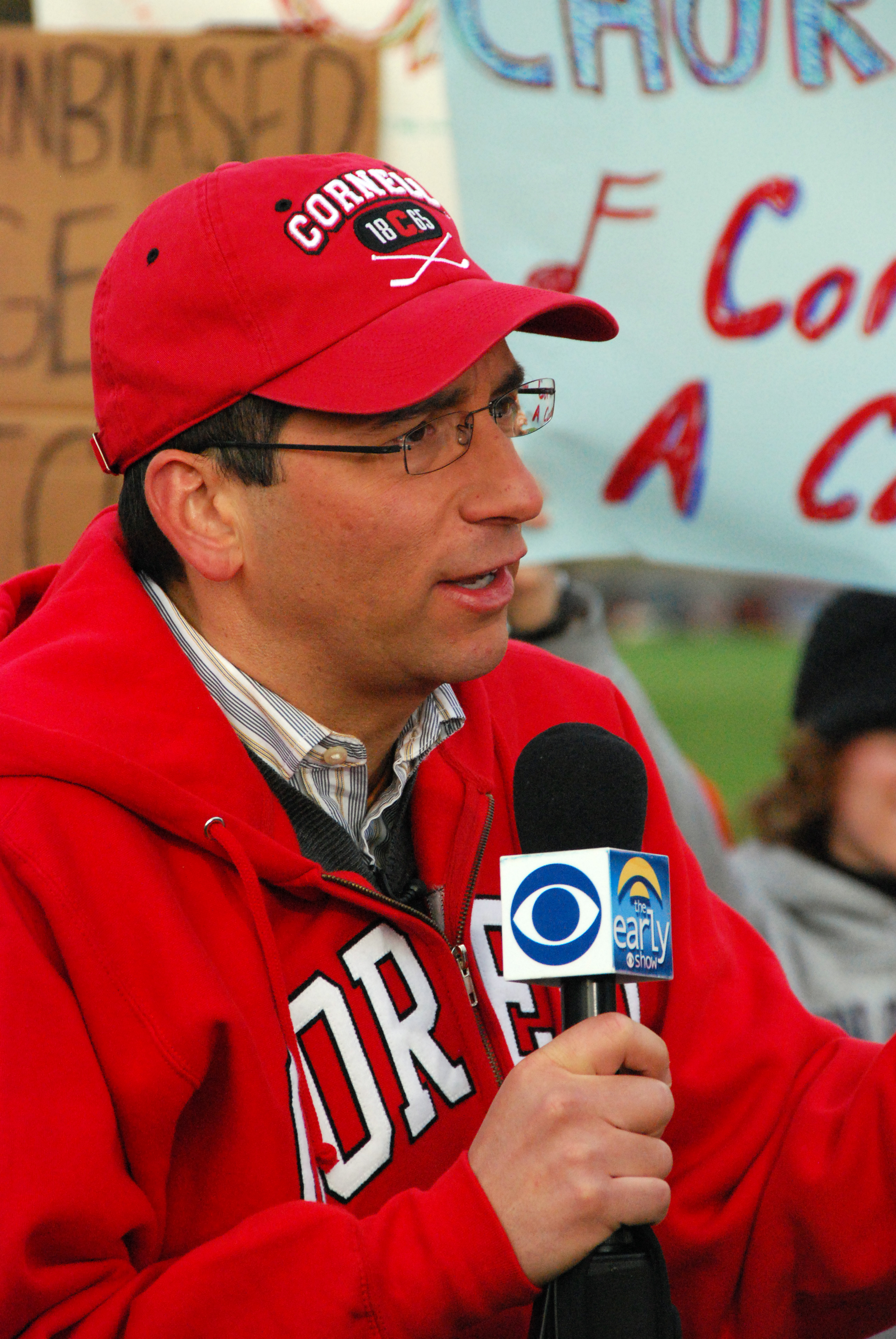
Price broadcasting from the fall 2008 orientation of his alma mater, the Cornell University ILR School

== Awards ==
- At Fox station WTXF-TV in Philadelphia, Price earned a local Emmy for his reporting from the Persian Gulf.
- Received two local Emmys for his work at Chicago station WBBM-TV (CBS).
- In New York City, won two local Emmys for Best Feature and Best Host.
- Recipient of the American Women in Radio and Television Gracie Award for his report on Joan Lovett.
- On April 25, 2007, Dave was honored by the Poughkeepsie Area Chamber of Commerce. He was given an honorary 100 year membership.
- On May 17, 2009, Dave was given an Honorary Degree from Sacred Heart University, Fairfield, Connecticut.
