= Bobby Rivers =

American television personality (1953–2023)

- Born: Robert Bennett Rivers Jr. September 20, 1953; Los Angeles, California, U.S.
- Died: December 26, 2023 (aged 70); Minneapolis, Minnesota, U.S.
- Education: Marquette University
- Occupations: Television and radio personality, actor
- Years active: 1970s–2023

Robert Bennett Rivers Jr. (September 20, 1953 – December 26, 2023) was an American television and radio personality and actor. Rivers was the host of the Top 5 show on the Food Network, and Watch Bobby Rivers, a prime-time celebrity talk show on VH1.

== Early life and education ==
Rivers was born in Los Angeles in 1953, and grew up in South Central Los Angeles during the tumultuous 1960's. He graduated from Marquette University in Wisconsin. Rivers' first television appearance was as a high school student on a 1970 syndicated classic-film trivia game show. During those times on The Movie Game, shot in Hollywood, he was the program's first African-American contestant, and its youngest winner.

== Career ==
After working in Milwaukee radio, he made his professional television debut in 1979 on Milwaukee's ABC affiliate, WISN-TV, as the city's first African-American film critic on TV. He did this as a contributor on Milwaukee's edition of PM Magazine, a syndicated show that had national hosts, such as Matt Lauer, Mary Hart and Leeza Gibbons. During that time, he was tapped to audition as a possible replacement as movie critic when Gene Siskel and Roger Ebert left Chicago PBS for Disney syndication. In 1984, he had moved up to co-host and associate producer of a live weekday show on WISN.

After that show was canceled in 1985, Rivers was offered a job as an entertainment reporter for WPIX-TV in New York City. In 1987, he was hired as a VJ by the American cable television channel VH1. Executives there utilized his comedic and interviewing skills, which led to his own show on the network the following year called Watch Bobby Rivers. Stephen Holden of The New York Times called him "a master interviewer with a gift for banter". On VH1, he interviewed Paul McCartney, Kirk Douglas, Meryl Streep, Mel Gibson, Carlos Santana, Raúl Juliá, Michael Caine, Mel Blanc, Jodie Foster, Liza Minnelli, Marlo Thomas and Norman Mailer, among others. He hosted veejay segments with the network's new addition, Rosie O'Donnell, until 1990.

In 1989, he played Talkback host Chris Perley on the television series, The Equalizer, in an episode called "Making of a Martyr" interviewing a gun control advocate on the fictional WFQB FM radio station. The episode also featured Sally Jesse Raphael as herself.

Rivers hosted two short-lived syndicated game shows, Bedroom Buddies and U Do-It TV. In 1992, he was approached to be a lifestyles and entertainment reporter on local WNBC-TV's Weekend Today in New York and WNYW-TV's Good Day New York. For the latter, he was hired as a replacement for Australian personality Gordon Elliott, who had left.

Rivers performed onstage, and appeared on the television show The Sopranos. In 2000, he was the entertainment editor on Lifetime Live, an ABC News/Lifetime weekday magazine hour. He also worked on-camera with its hosts, Deborah Roberts and the late Dana Reeve. After the cancellation of Lifetime Live, he hosted Food Network's Top 5 in 2002. Production ended in 2004, but the show aired weekly with reruns until 2008.

Whoopi Goldberg, a one-time guest on Rivers' VH1 talk show, picked him to be the weekly film critic and entertainment reporter on her national weekday morning show for Premiere Radio, Wake Up with Whoopi. The show lasted from 2006 to 2008. Director Steven Soderbergh used footage of Rivers' VH1 interview with Spalding Gray in his documentary about the late monologist and actor. The 2010 release was titled And Everything Is Going Fine. Rivers moved into comedic acting, playing "Professor Robert Haige" in In The Know, a satirical roundtable news segment in The Onion news network's video podcast.

Beginning in 2011, Rivers wrote a blog about television and films called Bobby Rivers TV.

In 2020, he was featured in The Sit-In: Harry Belafonte Hosts The Tonight Show. He told writer and co-producer Joan Walsh that he remembered watching the show as a child with his family in Los Angeles. "He helped with my Belafonte documentary more than anyone but my co-producers and director -- and Mr. B. himself of course," Walsh said on social media after she learned he died.

== Personal life and death ==
Rivers was gay, never married nor had any children. He died from cancer at a hospital in Minneapolis, Minnesota, December 26, 2023, at age 70.
