= Tina Cervasio =

American sports anchor

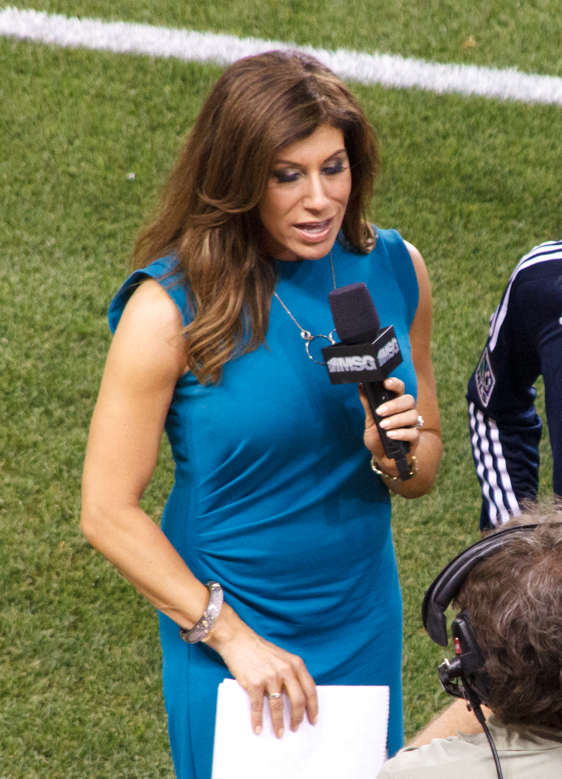
- Born: Tina Cervasio; December 10, 1974 (age 51); Nutley, New Jersey, United States
- Education: University of Maryland
- Occupation: Sportscaster
- Spouse: Kevin McKearney (m. 2004)
- Website: tinacervasio.com

Tina Cervasio (born December 10, 1974) is an American sports anchor. She is the lead sports anchor for Good Day New York on Fox 5 NY WNYW and the host of Sports Extra on Sunday nights at 10:30 in New York City. She has worked for CBS Sports Network as a sideline reporter, SiriusXM NBA Radio as a host, the New York Red Bulls television broadcasts as the pre-game and halftime host and reporter. Cervasio is the winner of Seven New York Emmy Awards as part of the New York Knicks Broadcasts on MSG Networks from 2008 to 2015.

== Life and current career ==
Originally from Nutley, New Jersey, Cervasio graduated from the University of Maryland in 1996 with a B.A. degree in journalism.

Cervasio is currently a sideline reporter on CBS Sports Network for College Football and College Basketball, a talk radio host at SiruisXM NBA Radio and Mad Dog Sports Radio, and the pregame and halftime host of New York Red Bulls broadcasts on MSG Network. Cervasio is also the host of “Red Bulls Insider,” a magazine-show on MSG, and handles part-time reporting and anchor duties on FOX 5 New York's “Good Day New York” and “Sports Extra”. And also had been a co host for DirecTV’s NFL Sunday ticket from 2001-2002 as well as a fill-in host when Spencer Tillman was doing select NFL on CBS games with Tim Brando.

Cervasio, a seven-time New York Emmy Award Winner, as part of the New York Knicks Broadcasts on MSG Networks, is known for telling exclusive stories in feature packages about players, including #STATFam on Amare’ Stoudemire’s family unit, acquiring never before released photos of his private NYC Rooftop Wedding Ceremony in 2012. She also conducted an interview with Carmelo Anthony about his late father, his Puerto Rican heritage, and his passion for giving back to those who live there. In 2015 she became the first female lead-host on SiriusXM NBA Radio.

Over her career, Cervasio has worked as a sideline reporter for the NFL on FOX and NBA on TNT. In 2007 at NESN, she earned a personalized World Series Ring as a team broadcaster, following the Boston Red Sox World Series Championship.

Cervasio left NESN when her contract expired at the end of March 2008. She expressed a desire to pursue other opportunities with less travel requirements so that she could be closer to her family. Cervasio then signed a contract to work with MSG in New York as a studio host and New York Red Bulls sideline reporter. In December 2008, following changes at MSG, Cervasio was assigned to the New York Knicks Broadcasts as the team sideline reporter. She filled that role, filled-in as a pre-game and post-game host, contributed with several in-depth features stories until her contract ended in 2015. In 2016 Cervasio returned to MSG on a freelance basis to continue her role with the Red Bulls Broadcasts as the pre-game host, half-time host, in-game reporter, and post game interviewer.

== Charities and foundations, events ==
In 2008, 2009, and 2013, Cervasio ran the New York City Marathon for Garden of Dreams Foundation. She regularly visits New York City Public Schools to motivate students with Sports and Arts in Schools Foundation, serves on the fundraising committee for the Clara Maass Medical Center Foundation / David Diehl Golf Invitational, and serves as emcee for several fundraisers each year, including United Way of New York, Sarcoma Foundation of America, Voices Against Brain Cancer, and Coaches vs. Cancer among others. Cervasio is an active member of Women in Sports and Events (WISE), from the NYC Metro steering committee to emceeing events. Cervasio was the first female emcee at the 2016 New York City Basketball Hall of Fame Induction. In 2017, Cervasio joined Inside Sport Group as a founding advisor, where she also serves as an emcee for each of the company's exclusive member events.

== Early career ==
According to Cervasio, her lifelong interest in sportscasting dates to a trip her family made to the Rose Bowl game when she was eleven years old. At the University of Maryland she worked at the campus radio station WMUC and anchored a sports program Terrapin Time Out on the university's television station.

Cervasio worked at a variety of assignments after graduation. She was a reporter or host on NFL Sunday Ticket, Animal Planet, ESPN2, FSN New York, Sunshine Network, and The New Jersey Fishing Show on CN8. Her radio experience included updates on WFAN in New York, sideline reporting for the NFL on Sports USA Radio, and substitute sports anchoring on the Imus in the Morning program on MSNBC and WFAN. She also had a feature article about then New Jersey Nets all-star guard Jason Kidd published in the Spring 2004 edition of That's Life magazine, and hosted the premiere red carpet screening of the film Remedy in 2004 in New York City. Additionally, she appeared as a special correspondent on the weekly sports television show North Jersey Sports Showcase in the fall of 2004.

In August 2002, she served as sideline reporter for the af2's Arena Cup game between the Florida Firecats and Peoria Pirates which was commentated by Eli Gold and Mike Hold and broadcast live on The Vision Channel, seen only on Dish Network. She interviewed several key people in both the af2 and the Arena Football League.

Cervasio regards her reporting on the 2004 Summer Olympics for Westwood One radio as a highlight of her career. Before she began working for NESN in 2006, she was the weekend morning sports anchor for WCBS-TV. In addition to her sports reporting, she has done radio voiceover work.

== Personal life ==
She is married to Kevin McKearney.
