= Andrea Day =

Andrea Day (born September 19, 1968) is a freelance reporter handling the financial crime and punishment beat for CNBC. She previously worked as a reporter for WNYW-FOX 5 New York City from 1997 through 2011, where she appeared on both Good Day New York and "FOX 5 News at 10."

== Career ==
Before joining FOX 5, Andrea was a reporter at News 12 Long Island. She began her career in television as a vice president for J. Walter Thompson, New York where she helped create some of the most memorable advertising in the world. Andrea is a graduate of Lake Forest College and holds a B.A. in business and studio art. She is a student of famous broadcast coach Lilyan Wilder.

== Awards ==
Andrea's record as a versatile reporter has won her a string of coveted assignments, including live coverage of "The Kennedy Crash" from Hyannisport and the exclusive "Baby Sale" case. Andrea was honored with three Emmy Awards for her investigative reports and has received nine Emmy Award nominations. She has also received numerous FOLIO awards for her news coverage and investigative journalism. In her free time, she works with the March of Dimes, helping families with premature babies. She has won numerous EFFIE awards for her distinctive advertising for brands, including Clairol and Kodak. She has also appeared in several television commercials.
