= Stacy-Ann Gooden =

American model and weather reporter

- Born: Jamaica
- Education: St. John's University (New York City)
- Children: 2

Stacy-Ann Gooden is a Jamaican-born American model and weather reporter. Formerly presenting on NY1, she previously worked at several stations in the New York metropolitan area including WNYW, WRNN-TV, and the News 12 Networks. She is now at WPIX, New York City.

== Life ==
Gooden was born in Jamaica and grew up in Brooklyn, New York City. She earned a bachelor's degree from St. John's University and majored in geoscience at Mississippi State University. She worked as a traffic anchor on WNYW's Good Day New York from 2004 to 2007, and Metro Traffic for News 12 Networks. In broadcast. she reported general assignments, edited general news stories, and made films as a videographer in New York and New Jersey. September 2019, Gooden joined WPIX11 in New York City as the weekend weather reporter and weekday feature reporter.

As a model, Gooden appeared in magazines such as YM and The Source. She earned the crown for Miss New York American United States in 2002, and entered the semifinals of the 2002 Miss Jamaica Universe Pageant.

=== Recognition ===
- New York Press Club award for her work covering Hurricane Sandy.
- Commendation by the New York State Senate for her community work with non-profit organization Neighbors with Neighbors

=== Personal life ===
Gooden married in 2005, and has two children; she blogs about her experiences raising mixed-race children at Weather Anchor Mama.
