= Vanessa Alfano =

American journalist

- Born: May 9, 1976 (age 50); Long Island, New York, U.S.
- Education: Messiah College
- Occupations: Journalist, television personality
- Years active: 2000s–present
- Employer(s): WWOR-TV; WNYW-TV; WCBS-TV; News 12 Long Island
- Known for: Founder of HealthyStyleNY.com
- Website: HealthyStyleNY.com

Vanessa Alfano (born May 9, 1976) is a TV journalist and the founder of healthystyleny.com.

Alfano is former TV reporter for Good Day NY and American weather anchor for WWOR-TV in New York City. She was also a feature reporter and fill-in weather anchor for WNYW-TV the Fox Affiliate in New York City whom she joined in 2006. She previously worked at WCBS-TV as the traffic reporter for CBS 2 This Morning.

Alfano is a Long Island, New York native. She began her news career as a weather anchor and traffic agent on Long Island's News 12 Traffic & Weather. Although she earned a degree in English from Messiah College and spent some time as a teacher, she changed careers after meeting a reporter.

Vanessa Alfano is a reporter, host, and television personality in the NYC area. She is also the founder of HealthyStyleNY.com and has recently been featured on Today in NY, Better TV, and Fox News Channel. She also has a recurring role on the new Fox Business Network show, Money Rocks.

Vanessa also spent years as a reporter for WNYW's Good Day New York. She worked as a Features reporter and Weather Anchor for the Newscast and also worked for their sister station, My. She also was a Traffic anchor of WCBS-TV's morning newscasts where she also covered Features and Entertainment News. She started her career with News 12 Long Island.
