= Tom Gregory (radio and TV announcer) =

American radio and television actor

Thomas R. Gregory (July 26, 1927 – December 11, 2006) was an American radio and television announcer and news anchor.

== Early life and education ==
Born in Charleston, South Carolina, Gregory served in the United States Navy during World War II. After the war, he went to Seton Hall University in New Jersey, initially as a law student. It was at that point that he began his broadcasting career as an announcer with their radio station. He then switched majors, received a bachelor's degree in communications, and after graduation became an announcer with WPAT in Paterson, New Jersey, where a few other announcers of the time later became announcers at his future employer.

== Career ==
In 1955, Gregory joined WABD (later WNEW-TV, now WNYW) in New York, as an announcer and occasional children's show host. From 1958 to 1965, he was the host of the mid-afternoon show Cartoon Playtime, on which vintage Looney Tunes and Merrie Melodies cartoons were shown, and also occasionally hosted Wonderama.

Beginning in 1965, Gregory was the anchor of a late evening newscast, Faces and Places in the News, which was a predecessor to The 10 O'Clock News. It was on this pre-1967 newscast that he coined the now-famous phrase "It's 10 P.M. Do you know where your children are?" which has been used to open the 10 P.M. newscast to this day. His on-camera career came to an end following a vicious mugging where afterward he received 200 stitches, with scarring so severe that he required massive plastic surgery; he became an off-camera announcer full-time from there on in. His voice and delivery were so distinctive, especially on sign-offs, that he became known among television buffs as "Metromedia Man". He remained with the station until 1986.

Early on in his career, Gregory also appeared on other children's shows such as Captain Kangaroo, occasionally filled in for Sandy Becker, and appeared with the likes of Soupy Sales, Chuck McCann, "Officer" Joe Bolton, and others.

== Death ==
Gregory died of heart disease in Sarasota, Florida at age 79.
