= Baruch Shemtov =

American journalist and fashion entrepreneur (born 1987)

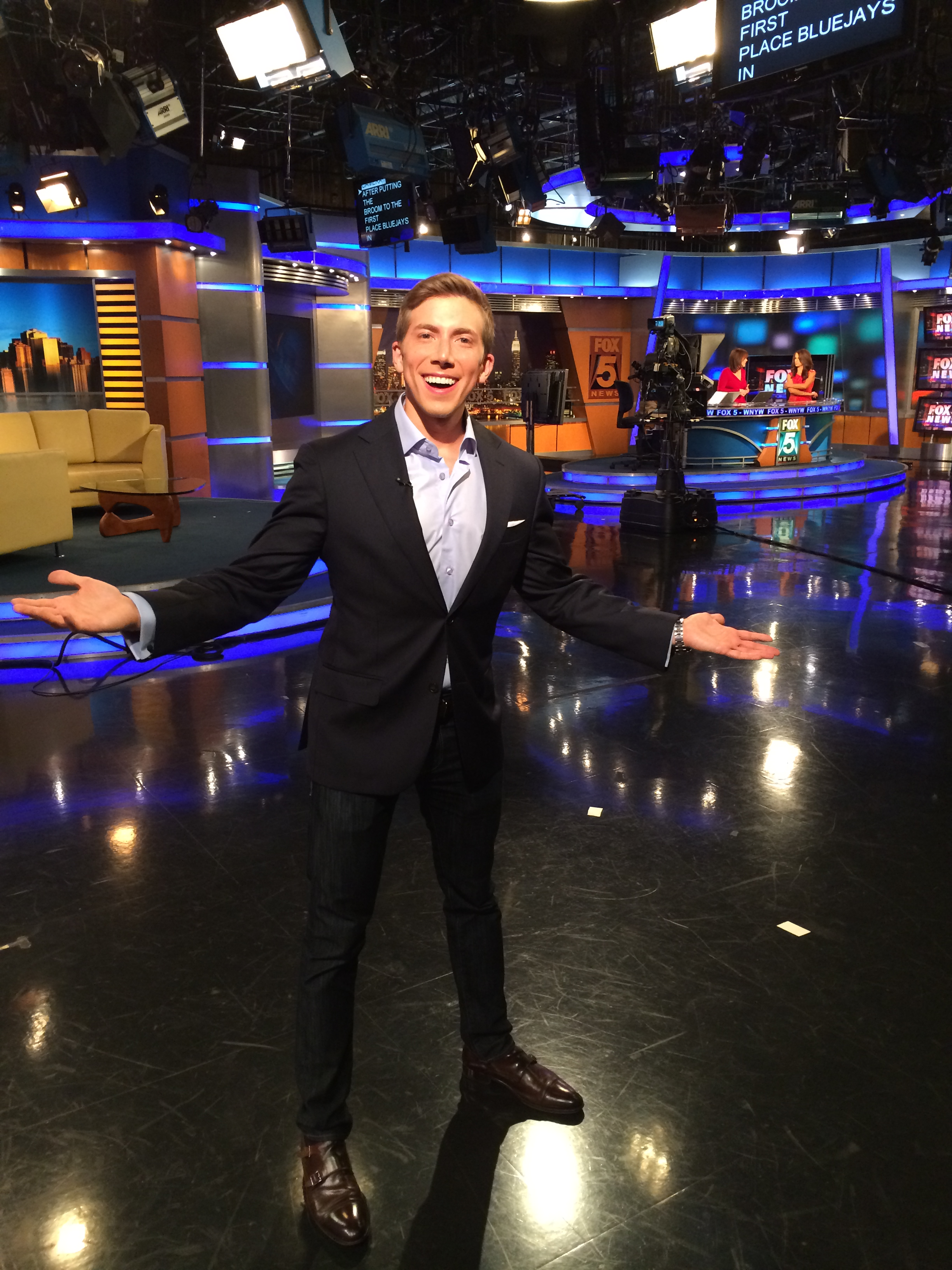
- Shemtov in 2014
- Born: Baruch Yehudah Shemtov; September 22, 1987 (age 38); Philadelphia, Pennsylvania, U.S.
- Education: Ramaz School
- Alma mater: Harvard College
- Occupations: Television host; Journalist; Fashion designer; Entrepreneur

Baruch Yehudah Shemtov (born September 22, 1987) is an American journalist, media personality, and entrepreneur. He worked as the entertainment anchor for Good Day New York on Fox 5 NY (WNYW) from 2017 to 2019, and previously served as a correspondent for Young Hollywood and Extra.

== Early life and education ==
Shemtov was born in Philadelphia, Pennsylvania, to Chantzie Annette Waldman and Dr. Menachem Mendel Shemtov. He moved with his family to Manhattan at age one.

He attended the Ramaz School and took courses at the Fashion Institute of Technology. During high school, he interned with designers such as Jonathan Adler and worked with the Ralph Lauren Corporation.

He graduated in 2005 and earned a Bachelor of Arts in psychology from Harvard College in 2009. He briefly attended Harvard Business School from 2013 to 2014.

== Fashion career ==
At age fifteen, Shemtov began creating and selling neckties, initially as a reaction to his school's dress code. One of his early designs was the "double tie," featuring a second tie stitched atop the first.

His products were sold at boutiques in New York, including Jelly, Cantaloup, and Takashimaya. They were later featured in New York Fashion Week.

In 2005, he expanded into women’s apparel and debuted a line of T-shirts in Los Angeles. That same year, he was a finalist in Russell Simmons’ Race to BE competition, which included opening the New York Stock Exchange with Simmons.

Shemtov also appeared in an episode of Biz Kid$ and participated in a NASDAQ closing bell ceremony with the show in 2009.

== Media career ==
Following his graduation from Harvard, Shemtov worked with CNN and created the online interview series "Baruch.tv" for The Huffington Post.

In 2012, he joined Young Hollywood as its New York correspondent. He continued in that role until 2015.

He began contributing to WNYW in 2014 and later became the entertainment anchor for Good Day New York from 2017 until 2019.
