= Dick Oliver =

American television reporter (1939–2016)

- Dick Oliver in 1993
- Born: Richard Vincent Oliver Jr. April 11, 1939; New York, New York, U.S.
- Died: November 11, 2016 (aged 77); New York, New York, U.S.
- Education: Columbia University (B.A., M.S.)
- Occupations: Journalist; reporter
- Years active: 1961–2002
- Notable credit: Reporter for Good Day New York (TV program) (1988-2002)
- Spouses: Marilyn Blendowski; Kathryn McGrath (m. 1993–2016)
- Children: 2

Richard Vincent Oliver Jr. (April 11, 1939 – November 11, 2016) was an American print journalist, radio host and television reporter, best known for his tenure as a correspondent for Good Day New York from 1988 until 2001, broadcast on television station WNYW Fox 5.

Oliver was the first journalist to report on the September 11 attacks on live television.

== Career ==
Oliver was born in Astoria, Queens. He graduated from William Cullen Bryant High School, and received his bachelor's degree from Columbia University and master's degree from Columbia School of Journalism. He started his career as a reporter and editor with the New York Daily News, in 1961, before becoming a reporter for United Press International

Oliver was a radio host, as presenter of a program called The Daily News Bulldog Edition in 1978, and becoming assistant managing editor in 1980, he remained with the program that was broadcast on several New York station's until 1995.

In 1988 he became a reporter on the television breakfast show Good Day New York until 2001. On July 19, 2001, while field reporting on a landlord–tenant dispute, he was involved in a heated exchange live on air with Good Day New York anchor Jim Ryan.

On the morning of September 11, 2001, Oliver was on assignment in Lower Manhattan when the attack on the World Trade Center began. From street level near New York City Hall, Oliver's camera crew captured the audio of American Airlines Flight 11 impacting the North Tower. With the production truck still running, the station quickly interrupted a commercial break to switch to Oliver. After 8 minutes, the uplink signal from the van was interrupted due to a failure at the receiver on the roof of one of the two towers. Reporting from Oliver continued over a phone line.

His live report was among the earliest news coverage of the event. Oliver would retire from Fox the following year and afterward taught journalism at Columbia University, Hunter College and New York University.

He died in a hospice care facility on November 11, 2016, aged 77, from complications of a stroke.
