= Sukanya Krishnan =

American news anchor (born 1971)

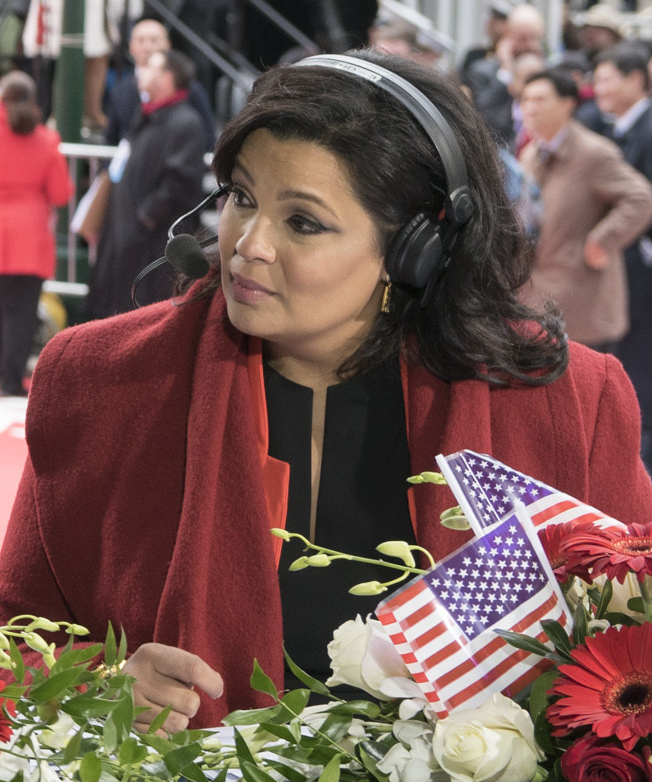
Krishnan in 2015

Sukanya Krishnan (Tamil: சுகன்யா கிருஷ்ணன்) is an American news anchor from New York City. She is best known for her work with WPIX from 2001 to 2003 and from 2005 to 2017.

== Early life ==
Born in Madras, India (now Chennai), Krishnan grew up in Dongan Hills, Staten Island and attended New Dorp High School. In 1993, she graduated from Dickinson College with a bachelor's degree in Spanish.

== Career ==
Krishnan's prior experience in the New York news market included a stint at WCBS-TV, from June 1997 to July 2001 as a general assignment reporter. In 1995, she was an anchor, reporter and producer of the 6 pm and 11 pm news broadcasts at ABC affiliate WUTR-TV in Utica, New York. She cut her teeth in broadcasting at Long Island's WLIG-TV in 1994. Prior to joining WCBS-TV, she was a morning/noon anchor and reporter for WHP-TV, Harrisburg, Pennsylvania's CBS affiliate. She covered various stories including TWA Flight 800, the "Million Man March" and the floods of 1996 which wreaked havoc on central Pennsylvania. While at WCBS-TV, Krishnan covered breaking news for CBS 2's 5, 6 and 11 p.m. newscasts.

She joined WPIX on August 8, 2001, and left in late 2003 to become one of the four hosts of the syndicated TV show Home Delivery In March 2004, Krishnan played a reporter covering the mob on the "Two Tonys" episode of HBO's The Sopranos. Her community volunteering includes being a celebrity judge for the 2005 Iron Skillet Cookoff. Krishnan returned to the WB11 Morning News (later CW11 Morning News, now PIX Morning News) anchor chair in 2005. On May 3, 2017, at the end of the PIX11 6-9 Morning News, she announced her final weeks as one of the station's co-anchors. Her last day on-air was Thursday, May 18, 2017.

On August 21, 2017, Krishnan joined Fox 5 NY WNYW as one of the new morning anchors of Good Day Wake Up from, 4:30am–7am, replacing Teresa Priolo and Antwan Lewis. Until 2019, she co-anchored the program with Jennifer Lahmers.

In 2020, Krishnan hosted the TLC show Find Love Live, and in 2021, she became the host of 90 Day Fiancé: Love Games, a dating and relationships show on Discovery+ streaming service.

Since 2022, Krishnan has served as the reunion 'One On One' host on Sister Wives.

== Awards ==
In 2006, Krishnan won her first Emmy for On-Camera Achievement (News Anchor/Host) from the New York Chapter of the National Academy of Television Arts and Sciences (NATAS). In addition to her Emmy Award, Krishnan also won the Project Impact (formerly Indian American Political Awareness Committee)'s "Creating A Voice" Award, and a Distinguished Broadcast Journalist commendation from the Office of the Comptroller of the City of New York, for her work covering the immediate aftermath of the September 11 attacks. In July 2006, she was honored at the FeTNA (Federation of Tamil Sangams of North America) annual convention held in New York City. In October 2007, Krishnan was named one of the 2007 Power Women by New York Moves Magazine, at an awards ceremony hosted by Mira Sorvino and MC'd by Judy Gold.

== See also ==
- Indians in the New York City metropolitan area
- New Yorkers in journalism
