= Anna Gilligan =

American journalist

Anna Robinson Gilligan (born 1981) is a former entertainment reporter.

== Career ==
Gilligan is a former entertainment reporter for Good Day New York on Fox 5 in New York City. She is a host at Meettheboss and former host of Fast Track on FoxBusiness.com and a reporter/producer at the Fox News Channel. Gilligan was a frequent guest on the Fox News Channel late night talk show Red Eye with Greg Gutfeld.

== Personal life ==
On October 13, 2015, during the Fox 5 network morning show Good Day New York, it was revealed during a segment about cat adoption by her and Fox 5 News 10 o'clock anchor Steve Lacy via phone, that they would marry. The couple had their first daughter in 2020.

Gilligan was formerly in a relationship with actor Steve Guttenberg.
