= Here's How (TV series) =

Here's How is an early American television program which aired in 1946 on New York City television station WABD, which later that year became flagship station of the DuMont Television Network. The program was sponsored by Super Suds. An early experiment in television programming, segments in one of the episodes included a demonstration on how to clean windows, a segment on how a woman was chosen as model of the year, and a slapstick "chef satire". It was produced by Al Foster.

== Reception ==
Billboard panned the first episode of the series, saying that "half the material, better acted and better scripted, better lighted and better directed would have made a program"

The magazine reviewed the third episode more positively, saying that "after two scannings, Super Suds' Station WABD's Here's How has eliminated most of the bugs that were in its first presentation".

== Episode status ==
Methods to record live television did not exist until late 1947, and as such Here's How is now lost. Billboard magazine indicates that some of the commercials were done on film, and it is not known if copies of these commercials still exist.

A behind-the-scenes still photograph of the series in production can be seen in page 103 of text Television primer of production and direction viewable at the Internet Archive.
