= Julie Chang =

American television personality and former anchor

- Born: Julie Ju-young Chang
- Education: University of Michigan

Korean name
- Hangul: 장주영
- RR: Jang Juyeong
- MR: Chang Chuyŏng

Julie Ju-young Chang is an American television personality and former anchor for Good Day L.A. and Fox 11 Morning News on KTTV in Los Angeles, joining the station in November 2012 to May 2020. She joined the morning show Good Day New York in June 2008, but changed over to the evening newscasts in October 2011. Previously, she was a feature reporter for the CW11 Morning News, WPIX. Chang has been recognized for her work with a New York State Associated Press Award and a 2007 Emmy nomination.

== Early life ==
Originally from South Korea, Chang moved to Ann Arbor, Michigan, when she was nine years old. Six years later, her parents returned to Korea, but Chang stayed in the United States with her older sisters. A graduate of the University of Michigan with a B.A. in economics, Chang also studied Environmental Studies at Oxford University in Oxford, England.

== Career ==
After originally pursuing a career in banking, Chang found her calling in 2000 after attending Semester at Sea. She sailed around the world, spending time in such varied locations as Cuba, Brazil, South Africa, Kenya, India, Malaysia, Vietnam, Hong Kong, China and Japan. The voyage gave birth to her passion: storytelling which can expose, educate and enlighten her viewing audience.

While at WPIX, Chang covered both breaking and feature news. She also hosted the "Truly Julie" segment on the CW11 Morning News. She was featured in the February 2007 issue of high fashion magazine W, for which she was photographed by Philip-Lorca diCorcia. Chang has also appeared in fashion magazine Lucky and lifestyle magazine New York Moves. She had a minor part playing herself in the 2011 feature film The Smurfs.

Chang left CW11 at the end of February 2008. She joined Fox 5 New York on June 16, 2008, and worked there until September 2012. The following month, Chang moved to WNYW's sister station, KTTV, where she was the entertainment anchor for Good Day L.A. and the Fox 11 Morning News. In mid-November 2013, it was announced that she would be taking medical leave to treat a brain tumor. On January 22, 2014, Chang returned from medical leave.

In May 2020, Chang decided to leave Good Day L.A..
