= Dick Brennan (journalist) =

American journalist

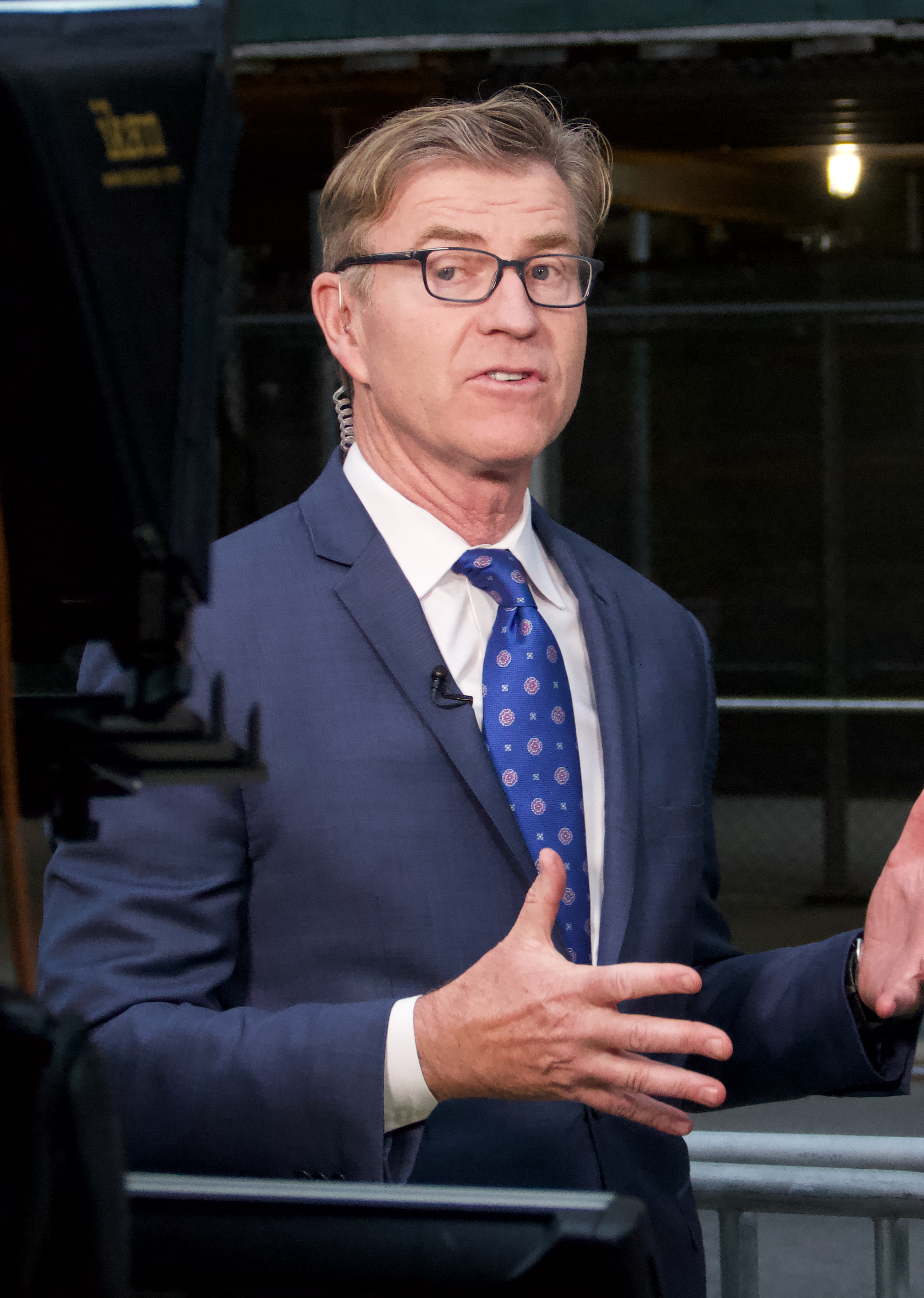
- Brennan reporting after the prosecution of Donald Trump in New York
- Born: Richard Brennan; May 2, 1969 (age 57); Queens, New York, U.S.
- Education: Fordham University
- Occupation: Journalist
- Title: Anchor/Reporter
- Children: 2
- Website: www.cbsnews.com/newyork/personality/dick-brennan/

Dick Brennan is an American journalist. Previously, he co-anchored CBS2 News at Six with Dana Tyler on WCBS-TV in New York and co-anchored the News At Nine on CBS2's sister station WLNY, with Alice Gainer. Before joining CBS2 Brennan was a political correspondent for Fox 5 News in New York City, and Brennan also serves as a fill-in & substitute anchor for CBS 2 News At 5:00 & 11:00.

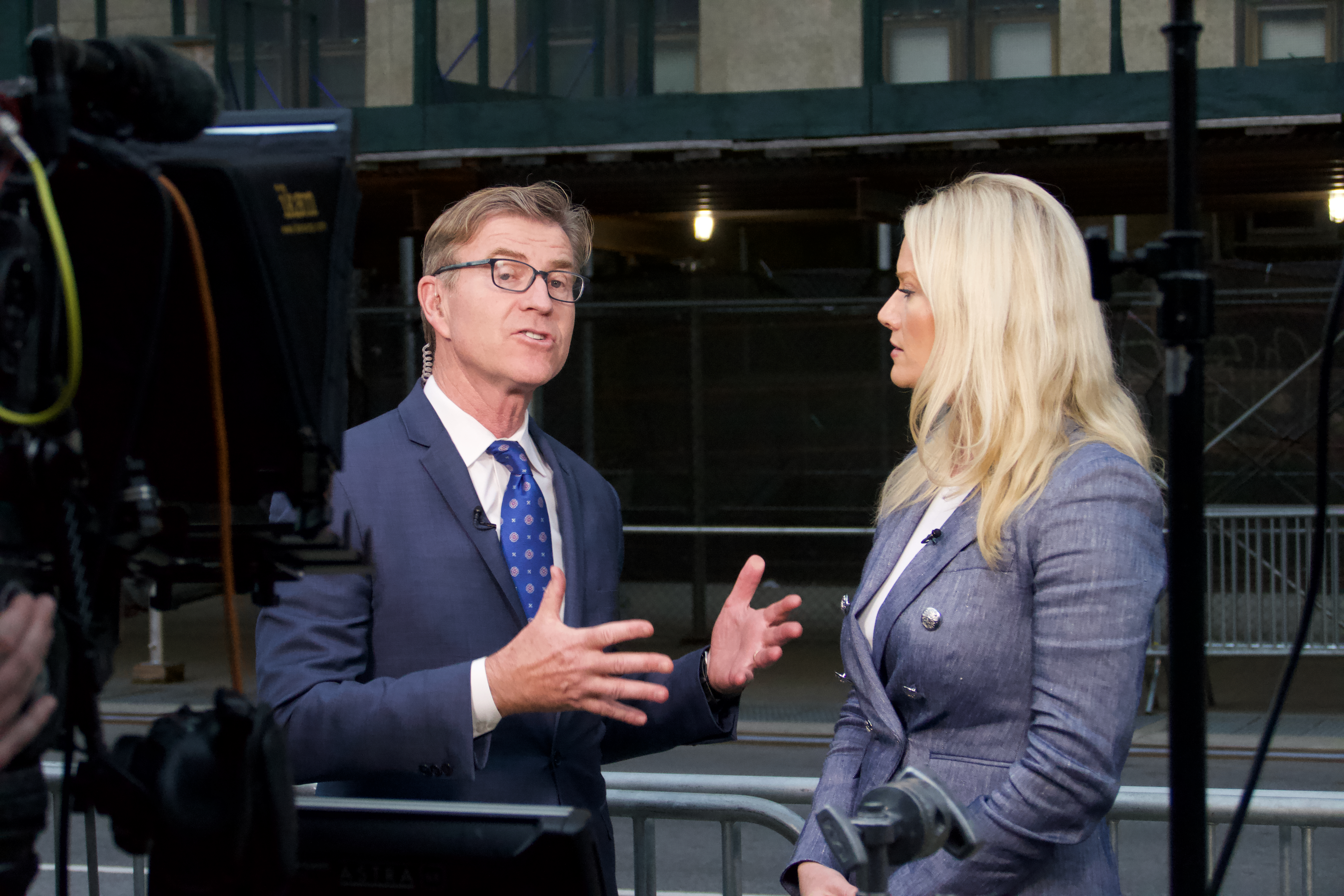
The jury has told the court its verdict: Trump is guilty. Dick Brennan (left) and Alice Gainer (right) talk to the TV camera.

Before appearing on-camera, Dick was a producer for radio personality Bruce Williams, WWOR-TV and WNBC-TV. After anchoring and reporting at UPN-9, now known as MY-9, Brennan made the switch to Fox's flagship WNYW as an anchor and reporter. He grew up in Queens, attended Archbishop Molloy High School, and then, graduated from Fordham University in the Bronx. Brennan lives in New York, and is married with two daughters.

Brennan made a cameo appearance on the eighth season of 24, playing himself in two episodes. He also appeared in an episode of Sex and the City.
