= Back9Network =

Golf media company (2010–2015)

- Country: United States
- Headquarters: Hartford, Connecticut

Programming
- Language: English
- Picture format: 480i (SDTV)

History
- Launched: 2010–2011 (channel); 2012–2015 (website)

Back9Network was a 24/7 golf lifestyle cable television network and media company based in Hartford, Connecticut, United States. It billed itself as an alternative to traditional media's focus on professional golf tournament coverage. Back9Network.com, the online clubhouse for Back9Network, delivered editorial and original content on golf lifestyle. The linear television channel broadcast for six months on DirecTV before closing due to undercapitalization. The company declared bankruptcy in 2015, with the original owners later launching a golf app for cellphones.

== History ==
Back9Network was founded in 2010, first launched online in April 2012, and re-launched its website in January 2013. The network raised private equity from a number of shareholders and received a $5 million loan from the state of Connecticut (which closed in March 2013). In September 2014, Back9Network launched on DirecTV in 20 million TV households. Ahmad Rashad was among Back9's most prominent names.

On February 23, 2015, the channel suspended operations due to a lack of funding, owing $5 million to the state of Connecticut as well as millions more to other creditors. It had gone through $40 million in capital, and 85 jobs were lost in two rounds of layoffs. In December 2015, the company filed for bankruptcy under Chapter 11 and exited bankruptcy in July 2016 as new operation – a golf app named Swing by Swing.
