= Greg Kelly =

American television host and political commentator (born 1968)

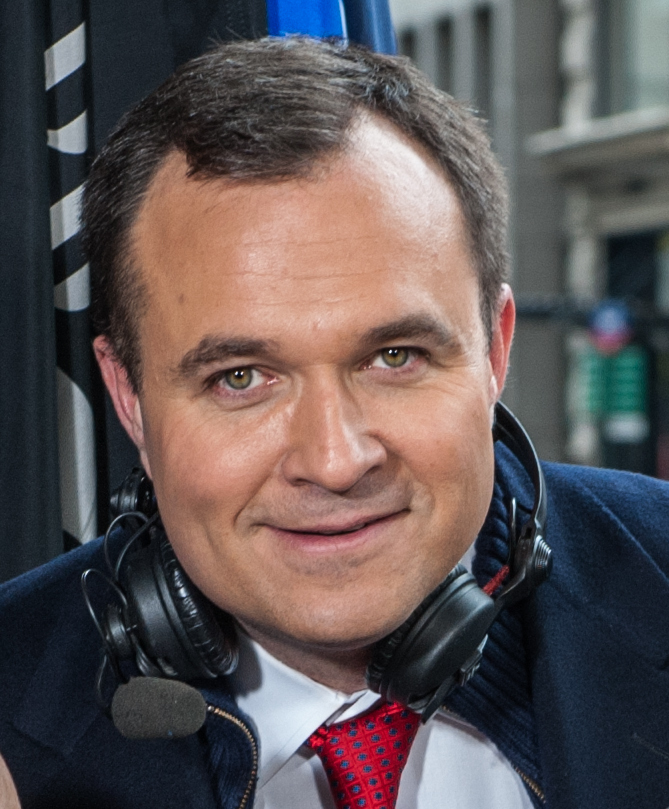
- Kelly in 2013
- Born: Gregory Raymond Kelly; December 17, 1968 (age 57); Garden City, New York, U.S.
- Education: Fordham University (BA)
- Occupations: Television host; political commentator; author
- Employer: Newsmax TV
- Political party: Republican
- Spouse: Judith Grey (m. 2017)
- Children: 2
- Parents: Raymond Kelly (father); Veronica Kelly (mother)
- Military service
- Allegiance: United States
- Branch: United States Marine Corps
- Service years: 1991–2000 (Active)
- Rank: Lieutenant Colonel
- Unit: Marine Attack Squadron 211
- Conflicts: Operation Southern Watch
- Website: Greg Kelly Podcast

Gregory Raymond Kelly (born December 17, 1968) is an American conservative television anchor, television host, author, and retired lieutenant colonel in the United States Marine Corps Reserve. He is the host of Greg Kelly Reports, on Newsmax TV. He was previously the co-host of Good Day New York on Fox 5 NY WNYW, with Rosanna Scotto, from 2008 to 2017.

== Early life and education ==
Kelly was born December 17, 1968 in Garden City, New York and attended Garden City High School. His father is former New York City Police Commissioner, Raymond W. Kelly, who spent over 45 years with the NYPD. Rising through the ranks to serve as commissioner for a total of 14 years — from 1993-94 under Mayor David Dinkins and from 2002-13 under Mayor Michael Bloomberg — his father became the longest-serving commissioner in NYPD history. Kelly graduated from Fordham University with a B.A. in political science. While attending Fordham, Kelly worked at WFUV as an on-air reporter.

== Military career ==
After graduating from Fordham, Kelly became an officer in the U.S. Marine Corps Reserves. During his tour of active duty military service between 1991 and 2000 he was an AV-8B Harrier jump jet pilot assigned to Marine Attack Squadron 211, the "Wake Island Avengers". While on duty Kelly amassed 158 aircraft carrier landings and flew over Iraq in Operation Southern Watch, enforcing the United Nations imposed No-Fly Zone.

== Media career ==
Kelly in 2013

Following his career in the Marines, Kelly became a news anchor in Binghamton, New York. Later, he was a political reporter for NY1 in New York City, covering the September 11 attacks. He joined Fox News in 2002.

During the 2003 U.S. invasion of Iraq, Kelly was an embedded reporter with the United States Army's 3rd Infantry Division, 2nd Brigade. He received a minor shrapnel wound to the face when a mortar round exploded near him. Kelly was the first television journalist to broadcast live pictures of U.S. military forces reaching the presidential palace in Baghdad.

Kelly was a host of Good Day New York from 2008 through June 2012 when he moved to the 6 and 10 PM news on Fox 5 and was replaced by Dave Price. In January 2013, Price announced his departure, and Kelly was moved back to Good Day New York. Kelly left Good Day New York in September 2017, replaced by former WABC-TV anchor Lori Stokes.

=== Newsmax ===
In January 2020, Kelly joined Newsmax TV, where he hosts Greg Kelly Reports in the 7 pm slot. In March 2021, Kelly joined WABC radio in New York City, to host in daytime.

==== Controversy ====
In June 2021, Kelly generated controversy by tweeting, and then deleting, a statement that "Military life had its Perks, but it was also a major pain. I will tell you what took 'the sting out of it'—that when I was flying around the Pacific Ocean off of ships, I knew there was a Secretary of Defense who was white, just like me! Made a big difference with 'morale'". Kelly said that these tweets were sarcastic and meant to indicate his opposition to racism. Kelly's followed up with the following tweet, "Now the TRUTH: being a MARINE had nothing to do with RACE. It didn’t matter. It wasn’t ’a thing’—the EXPERIENCE brought us together, no matter what we were. In September of the next year, he said on Greg Kelly Reports that the Smithsonian's National Museum of African American History and Culture was "creating more division" and asked "how much can we learn about Harriet Tubman?".

== Personal life ==
Kelly is married to Judith Grey, a creative director in advertising, and were wed on November 12, 2017. They have two children, both girls. In January 2012, Kelly was investigated by the Manhattan District Attorney's office upon an accusation of rape. After the investigation, the District Attorney issued a letter stating that under New York state criminal law, the incident did not constitute a crime. Kelly returned to work in February 2012.
