= Rosanna Scotto =

American television journalist

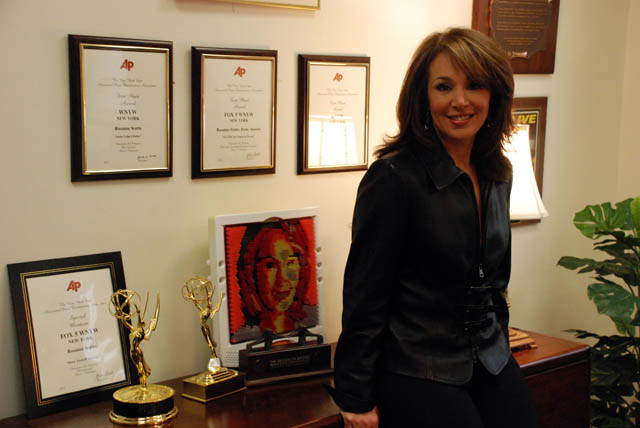
- Scotto in 2007
- Born: April 29, 1958 (age 68); New York City, U.S.
- Education: Catholic University (BFA)
- Notable credit(s): Anchor of Good Day New York WNYW (2008–present) formerly anchored with Greg Kelly (2008–2017) and with Lori Stokes. (2017–2021)
- Spouse: Louis Ruggiero (m. 1986)
- Children: 2
- Parent(s): Anthony Scotto; Marion Anastasio
- Relatives: Anthony Anastasio (grandfather)

Rosanna Scotto (born April 29, 1958) is an American news anchor. She is the co-host of Good Day New York, on Fox 5 NY WNYW in New York City. She formerly hosted with Greg Kelly. Previously, she anchored the 5 and 10 pm news with Ernie Anastos, and the Fox 5 Live 11 am news. She has been the lead female news anchor since 1990.

== Early life and education ==
Scotto was born in New York City on April 29, 1958, to Anthony Scotto (May 10, 1934 – August 21, 2021), a mobster, and Marion Anastasio (November 30, 1935 – August 17, 2026), daughter of Anthony Anastasio, also a mobster. Scotto graduated from Visitation Academy, a Catholic elementary school in Bay Ridge, Brooklyn. She graduated from Brooklyn's Packer Collegiate Institute in 1976. She attended The Catholic University of America (CUA) in Washington, D.C., graduating with a bachelor's degree in fine arts in 1980.

== Career ==
Rosanna Scotto began her career in television at WTBS, Ted Turner's UHF television station in Atlanta, where she was a reporter for two local programs and an associate producer of the station's evening newscast.

She returned to her native New York City in 1982 as a reporter for WABC-TV's Good Morning New York, which eventually became Live with Regis and Kathie Lee. After a year with Good Morning New York and The Morning Show, Scotto joined WABC-TV's Eyewitness News as a reporter, where she remained until she joined Fox's WNYW. Scotto started at WNYW-TV in 1986 as a weekend anchor and reporter and later in 1994, she started anchoring the weekday edition of Fox 5 News. She was a former anchor of the 5 and 10 pm newscasts with Ernie Anastos. In 2008, Rosanna was named and promoted to anchor of Good Day New York, soon moved alongside Greg Kelly. On April 29, 2010 Scotto gained some notoriety by suggesting "soy jism" as an alternative name for milk not produced by dairy cattle. Longtime WABC-TV morning anchor Lori Stokes replaced Kelly as Scotto's co-anchor shortly after Kelly left in September 2017.

On July 28, 2022, Scotto was featured for the first time as a co-host on The Five, substituting for Judge Jeanine Pirro. On May 10, 2025, Scotto was again a co-host on The Five, in Pirro’s former chair, the day after Pirro exited the network when she was nominated as a U.S. Attorney by President Trump.

== Acting roles ==
In 1997, Scotto made a cameo appearance as herself on an episode of the Fox police drama New York Undercover. She has been with WNYW for over 25 years.

Scotto appeared in the 1998 movie The Object of My Affection as a news anchor. She also had brief roles in the films, Lisa Picard Is Famous in 2000, Ransom in 1996, The Scout from 1994, the remake of Miracle on 34th Street (also 1994), Ghostbusters in 2016, and Jackpot! in 2024. She appeared as herself in an episode of the hidden camera reality show Impractical Jokers in April 2023.

== Personal life ==
In 1986, Scotto married Louis Ruggiero, a lawyer. They have two children, a son and a daughter. She is part owner of the family's New York City restaurant, Fresco by Scotto, where she often helps in the kitchen and greets diners.

Scotto is Catholic.

== See also ==
- New Yorkers in journalism
