= Christina Park =

American television news anchor

- Born: United States
- Education: University of Pennsylvania
- Occupation: News Anchor
- Children: 2

Christina Park is an American television news anchor. She previously anchored the news at 6 and 10 p.m. on the weekends on Fox 5 New York WNYW in New York City, as well as filling in during the weekly newscasts. Her former co-anchor alongside her during the weekend was Antwan Lewis. She joined the station in August 2007.

Christina Park joined WNYW/ Fox 5 in August 2007 as an anchor. Previously, she was an anchor for CNN Headline News and CNN.com Live. She has also reported for CNN Newsource in D.C. and was previously a weekend anchor/reporter for KPRC, the NBC affiliate in Houston. It was announced on May 18, 2018, that Park resigned from Fox 5 on May 16, allegedly due to poor working conditions in the newsroom as a result of construction work.

Park was anchoring the night the Iraq War began. Also, she has broadcast and produced during significant events such as the 2004 Presidential election, the tsunami disaster, and the Shuttle Columbia tragedy. As a field reporter, she has covered major stories such as Hurricane Katrina and Rita, as well as the collapse of Enron.

Park's career in journalism followed a unique path—she was studying to be a doctor when she chose her true calling—journalism. She joined CNN in 1999 as a producer for CNN Features. She has also reported for Headline News in addition to CNN and CNN International and has served as an anchor for CNN Student News. During her tenure at CNN, Park helped launch several programs, including "CNN.COM," for which she received a National Headliner Award. She also established a profile-style program, "People in the News." In August 2001, she moved to Headline News as a writer for the launch of the revamped network.

Park graduated with honors from the University of Pennsylvania with a degree in neuroscience. She was a concert pianist for the Atlanta Symphony Youth Orchestra and is fluent in Korean. Park resides in New York with her husband and two children.

== See also ==
- Korean Americans in New York City
- New Yorkers in journalism
