= Michael Gargiulo (journalist) =

American journalist

- Born: Michael Louis Gargiulo; February 12, 1960 (age 66); Manhattan, New York, U.S.
- Education: Xavier High School; New York University
- Occupation: Anchor/Reporter
- Notable credit: News Anchor (WNBC)
- Spouse: Shannon Powell (m. 1998)
- Children: 2
- Website: Profile

Michael Louis Gargiulo (born February 12, 1960) is an American television news anchor at WNBC (News 4 New York), NBC’s flagship station. He has anchored Today in New York with Darlene Rodriguez since 2008, and has been embedded with United States military units in Afghanistan, Iraq, Kuwait, and the Persian Gulf.

== Early life and education ==
Gargiulo was born and raised in Manhattan, New York. He is of Italian ancestry, the son of Mike and Dorothy Gargiulo. He has a sister, Susan Gargiulo.

He graduated from Xavier High School and went on to attend New York University, where he received a bachelor's degree in history and studied Italian, French, Russian, and German. He was an Eagle Scout.

== Career ==
WSAZ, NBC's affiliate in Charleston, West Virginia, hired Gargiulo in 1984 to host the local edition of the syndicated show PM Magazine. He then worked as a reporter and anchor at WYOU, the CBS affiliate in Scranton, Pennsylvania. In the early 1990s, he went to WLKY in Louisville, Kentucky, as a reporter.

From 1993 to 1997, he was a reporter and anchor at KSTP-TV in Minneapolis. He served as the Washington, D.C., correspondent for Hearst-Argyle Television from 1997 to 2000, and then anchored the morning newscast on WTTG, a Fox-owned station in Washington, from 2000 to 2006.

In July 2006, Gargiulo joined WNBC as a general assignment reporter and was then named anchor of Weekend Today in New York. In October 2007, he was named anchor of the station's 5:30pm newscast along with Sue Simmons, and he replaced Rob Morrison as co-anchor of Today in New York in May 2008. At WNBC, he was also a co-host of Nonstop Rundown, with Erika Tarantal and Tracie Strahan.

As an anchor at WNBC, he has led coverage of many major news events, including Pope Benedict XVI's visit to the United States, the commissioning of the USS New York, President Barack Obama's visit to Ground Zero after Osama bin Laden's death, Hurricanes Irene and Sandy, the New York Giants' ticker-tape parade, the 2012 Empire State Building shooting, the Sandy Hook Elementary School shooting, and the death of Mayor Ed Koch.

In 2014, he traveled to eastern Afghanistan to cover the last deployment of a unit of the United States Army's 10th Mountain Division. He reported on the same division in Iraq in 2007, and had also reported from Kuwait and Iraq in 2004.

Gargiulo has occasionally appeared on the Nickelodeon series Team Umizoomi, playing a reporter.

== Awards and honors ==
Gargiulo won an Emmy Award for breaking news coverage in 2009 for his reporting on a crane collapse on the Upper East Side. In 2010, he and Erika Tarantal won an Emmy for best morning newscast for Today in New York. He won another breaking news Emmy in 2013, and in 2014, he and his WNBC colleagues won the Emmy Award for Outstanding Regional News Story–Spot News for their coverage of Hurricane Sandy.

In September 2012, Gargiulo appeared with Lauren Calvo in a PSA for Lighthouse International's Double Up 4 Vision event.

In October 2012, he was the master of ceremonies for the Epiphany School Foundation's annual Walkathon and was honored by the organization, and the following year, the Roman Catholic Diocese of Brooklyn honored him for his reporting. In June 2016, the National Italian American Foundation launched a scholarship, the NIAF Michael Gargiulo Scholarship in Broadcasting and Communications.

== Personal life ==
Gargiulo was a Roman Catholic until he converted to Episcopalian in 2015. He married Shannon Powell on October 10, 1998. The couple has a son and a daughter. He is a teacher at the Center for Continuing Education in Mamaroneck.

On March 23, 2022, in his post on social media, he announced he had tested positive for COVID-19, after they spending their vacation in Mount Snow, Vermont in the previous week. He said that it was fully vaccinated and boosted from the virus.

== Television ==
Year	Title	Role	First episode
2012	Dateline NBC	Himself (WNBC reporter)	"Sandy: Rescue and Recovery"
2012–2013	Team Umizoomi	Himself	"Team Umizoomi vs. The Shape Bandit"

== Career timeline ==
- 1984–1987: WSAZ-TV reporter; PM Magazine host
- 1987–1991: WYOU anchor and reporter
- 1991–1993: WLKY reporter
- 1993–1997: KSTP-TV reporter and anchor of weekend newscasts
- 1997–2000: Hearst Television White House correspondent
- 2000–2006: WTTG anchor of weekday morning news
- 2006–present: WNBC
  - 2006–2007: general assignment reporter
  - 2007: anchor of weekend morning newscasts
  - 2007–2008: anchor of weekday 5:30 newscasts
  - 2008: anchor of weekday 5:00 newscasts
  - 2008–present: anchor of weekday morning newscasts
  - 2010–2011: Nonstop Rundown host
