= Christopher Columbus High School (Bronx) =

Public school in New York City

Location
- 925 Astor Avenue; Bronx, New York 10469; United States

Information
- Type: Public
- Oversight: NYCDOE
- Principal: Various
- Grades: 9 - 12
- Enrollment: 2000
- Colors: Silver and blue
- Nickname: Sharks
- Website: www.columbushs.org

Christopher Columbus High School is a public secondary school located in the Pelham Parkway section of the Bronx, New York City. It is within walking distance from the Bronx Zoo and the New York Botanical Garden.

It currently enrolls over 2000 students in grades 9 through 12. The student body is diverse, with students whose families come from 66 countries.

== Partnerships and special programs ==
Columbus High School has been a member of the Foundation for Excellent Schools since 1997. It has a partnership with the University of Vermont, which offers special courses at Columbus. JetBlue Airways provides free transportation to faculty and students traveling between Vermont and the Bronx.

As of June 2014, Columbus High School was broken down into the Christopher Columbus Educational Campus and shared its premises with four, smaller, specialized schools:

- Pelham Preparatory Academy
- Global Enterprise Academy
- Astor Collegiate High School
- Collegiate Institute for Math and Science (Principal Estelle Hans)(CIMS)

As of 2016, Columbus High School is composed of five, smaller, specialized schools:

- Collegiate Institute For Math and Science (CIMS)
- High School for Language and Innovation
- Bronxdale High School
- Astor Collegiate Academy
- Pelham Preparatory Academy

The Bronx High School for the Visual Arts, originally the first small school to move into the campus, moved out at the end of the 2004 school year. It currently resides in the old Mercy College Bronx campus which it shares with one other small school.

== Notable alumni ==
- Robert Abrams (born 1938), Bronx Borough President, New York State Attorney General
- Anne Bancroft (1931–2005), Oscar-winning actress
- Evelyn Berezin (1925–2018), computer scientist and creator of the first word processor
- David Berkowitz (born 1953), serial killer
- Alexander Bickel (1924–1974), constitutional law scholar, Sterling Professor of Law, Yale Law School
- Rudy De Luca, screenwriter and actor best known for his work with filmmaker Mel Brooks
- Christine Jorgensen (1926–1989), transgender woman who was the first person to become widely known for having sex reassignment surgery
- Jeffrey Klein (born 1960), member of the New York State Senate, former Deputy Majority Leader, Assemblyman for the 80th District, and Democratic District Leader
- Peter Levenda, author who focuses primarily on occult history; alleged writer of the fictive Simon Necronomicon
- Paul Levinson (born 1947), author, singer-songwriter, and professor of communications known for The O'Reilly Factor
- George Marino (1947–2012), mastering engineer known for working on albums by rock bands starting in the late 1960s
- John McGiver (1913–1975) (former teacher at the school), actor on stage, film and television 1950s-70s
- Sal Mineo, (1939–1976), actor, singer, and director; best known for his role as John "Plato" Crawford in the drama film Rebel Without a Cause and Exodus
- Johnny Monell (born 1986), former professional baseball catcher; played in Major League Baseball for the Mets and San Francisco Giants
- Izzy Molina (born 1971), former professional baseball catcher for the Oakland Athletics and Baltimore Orioles
- Tony Powers (born 1938), songwriter, recording artist, music video artist, and actor
- Darlene Rodriguez (as Darlene Pomales) (born 1971), co-anchor, Today in New York, WNBC-TV
- Neil Rosen (born 1956), Emmy award-winning movie critic and entertainment journalist, NY1 News and PBS
- Nancy Savoca (born 1959), film director, producer, and screenwriter
- James Vacca, member of the New York City Council
- Guy Velella (1944–2011), former New York State Senator and Bronx Republican chairman

== Teams ==
The Columbus Blue Steel won the Bronx Championships on November 3, 2006. In 2006, Blue Steel had two All-City Players, a Linebacker and a Defensive End.

The boys' lacrosse team in 2010 won the PSAL championship, the first PSAL title Columbus had won.

The girls softball team won the PSAL championship in 2019, the second title for Columbus and its only female championship.

In 1960 the men's basketball team made the PSAL Finals, matching up with Boy's High for the Final game.

The girls' volleyball team was dominant in their division in the late 80s, early 90s under the coaching of Annette Leder.

Other Columbus teams include:

- Girls' Teams: Soccer, Soft Ball, Basketball, Tennis, Track, Cheerleading, Step, Bowling, Gymnastics, Golf, Flag Football, Volleyball
- Boys' Teams: Soccer, Baseball, Basketball, Tennis, Track, Bowling, Golf, J.V. Football, Varsity Football, Lacrosse, Volleyball

The soccer team also has been successful in winning divisions in 2008 and 2009 and is in the process of producing young players such as Martin Dadaj, Armand Dadaj, Alhousein Bah, Mamoudou Diallo, Malal Diallo, Mamadou Barry, Endri Berisha, Frank Osei and Michael Asante.

== Threatened closure ==
In December 2009, the New York City Department of Education announced plans to close Christopher Columbus High School, citing poor performance and low graduation rates. The department's plan called for phasing out the school and not enrolling new students in the ninth grade starting in the fall of 2010. Students, parents, and community activists criticized the department and fought to keep the school open. The Supreme Court in New York county later rejected the Department of Education's proposal on the grounds that there were procedural errors made.
