= Movie Madness =

Movie Madness may refer to:

- Movie Madness Video, a video rental store in Portland, Oregon
- National Lampoon's Movie Madness, a 1981 film
- Tiny Toon Adventures 2: Montana's Movie Madness, a 1993 video game

== Television ==
- "Movie Madness" (Even Stevens), 2001
- "Movie Madness", a 2001 two-part episode of Power Rangers Time Force
- "Movie Madness", a 2006 episode of Hi Hi Puffy AmiYumi
- "Movie Madness!", a 2013 episode of Team Umizoomi
- Movie Madness (Cartoon Network), a 2007–08 Cartoon Network programming block
