= Jane Hansen =

Jane Hansen may refer to:

- Jane Hansen (businesswoman), Australian businesswoman and philanthropist
- Jane Hansen (model), New Zealand model, winner of Miss International 1971

== See also ==
- Jane Hanson, American television presenter
