= List of Team Umizoomi episodes =

This is a list of episodes from the Nickelodeon animated television series Team Umizoomi. The episodes are listed by seasons and original episode air dates. Note that the first season's episodes were completed in 2008 and 2009, and early season two episodes were completed in 2009.

== Series overview ==
Season	Episodes	Originally aired	
Season	Episodes	First aired	Last aired
1	20	January 25, 2010	December 6, 2010
2	20	October 18, 2010	October 14, 2011
3	20	October 13, 2011	December 6, 2012
4	20	February 4, 2013	April 24, 2015

== Episodes ==
=== Season 1 (2010) ===
No. overall	No. in season	Title	Animation directors	Written by	Storyboard by	Original release date	Prod. code
1	1	"The Big Boat Race"	Steven Conner	Sascha Paladino	Christopher Jammal and Jennifer Tippins	October 20, 2010	101
The team helps Sonya fix her sailboat, in time for the boat race.
2	2	"The Rolling Toy Parade"	Steven Conner	Michael T. Smith	Christopher Jammal and Jennifer Tippins	February 4, 2010	102
The team must find all the parts of Nick's lion toy, before Umi City Park's rolling toy parade.
3	3	"The Elephant Sprinkler"	Steven Conner	P. Kevin Strader	Christopher Jammal and Jennifer Tippins	April 15, 2010	103
The team helps Kayla fix the broken elephant sprinkler, so she can play in the water park on a hot day.
4	4	"The Kite Festival"	Steven Conner	Soo Kim	Christopher Jammal and Jennifer Tippins	January 25, 2010	104
After a gust of wind scatters the pieces of Jeannie's kite, the team searches for the pieces around Umi City.
5	5	"Carnival"	Steven Conner	Nerissa Holder and Liza Steinberg; Story Contributor : Stacey Jaffe	Bob Algeo, Robert Bandel, Christopher Jammal, Rick Ritter, and Jennifer Tippins	January 26, 2010	105
The team searches the Umi City Carnival for Jake's lost stuffed animal, Bunny.
6	6	"Special Delivery"	Steven Conner	Brian L. Perkins	Bob Algeo, Robert Bandel, Christopher Jammal, Rick Ritter, and Jennifer Tippins	February 12, 2010	106
When Anthony forgets to put stamps on a package for his grandmother, the team heads to the post office to ensure the package is delivered in time for "Just Because I Love You Day".
7	7	"Subway Heroes"	Steven Conner	P. Kevin Strader	Bob Algeo, Robert Bandel, Christopher Jammal, Rick Ritter, and Jennifer Tippins	February 1, 2010	107
The team helps Daniel's father, who is stuck on a broken subway train, get home in time for his son's birthday party to give him the birthday cake.
8	8	"Favorite Things Show"	Steven Conner	Sascha Paladino	Bob Algeo, Robert Bandel, Christopher Jammal, Rick Ritter, and Jennifer Tippins	October 19, 2010	108
The team helps Emily find her lost seashells, in time for the Favorite Things Show.
9	9	"To the Library"	Steven Conner	Brian L. Perkins	Bob Algeo, Robert Bandel, Christopher Jammal, Rick Ritter, and Jennifer Tippins	September 14, 2010	109
The team helps Olivia find her lost library book, so she can read to her grandfather before bed.
10	10	"The Milk Out"	Steven Conner	Michael T. Smith	Bob Algeo, Robert Bandel, Christopher Jammal, Rick Ritter, and Jennifer Tippins	February 2, 2010	110
After Umi City runs out of milk because the farmer is sick, the team helps to deliver milk to the three children who need it.
11	11	"Super Trip to the Supermarket"	Steven Conner	P. Kevin Strader	Bob Algeo, Christopher Jammal, Rick Ritter, and Jennifer Tippins	January 28, 2010	111
The team goes to the supermarket to get the items, Samantha needs to make her younger brother, Tyler's favorite snack.
12	12	"Ready for Take Off"	Steven Conner	Brian L. Perkins	Bob Algeo, Robert Bandel, Christopher Jammal, Rick Ritter, and Jennifer Tippins	February 19, 2010	112
The team helps Andy and his mother fix a plane at Umi City Airport that is unable to take off, so they can go to the beach.
13	13	"The Aquarium Fix-It"	Steven Conner	Brian L. Perkins	Bob Algeo, Christopher Jammal, Rick Ritter, and Jennifer Tippins	January 25, 2010	113
The team is called in to fix a leaking crack in a seahorse tank at the Umi City Aquarium for their friend Michael, before the seahorses have no place to live.
14	14	"The Ice Cream Truck"	Steven Conner	P. Kevin Strader	Bob Algeo, Christopher Jammal, Rick Ritter, and Jennifer Tippins	April 12, 2010	114
The team helps repair an ice cream truck with a flat tire, so Dylan and his friends can have ice cream pizzas.
15	15	"The Wild West Toy Train Show"	Steven Conner	Jennifer Twomey	Tom Conner and Jennifer Tippins	April 13, 2010	115
The team helps Ethan recover his ticket to the Wild West Toy Train Show, after a gust of wind blows it away.
16	16	"Picnic"	Sean McBride and Robert M. Wallace	Brian L. Perkins	Bob Cavin III, Christopher Jammal, Rick Ritter, and Jennifer Tippins	January 27, 2010	116
The team helps Anna find her missing lunchbox and thermos.
17	17	"The Dinosaur Museum Mishap"	Sean McBride and Robert M. Wallace	Brian L. Perkins and Jeff Borkin	Bob Cavin III, Christopher Jammal, Rick Ritter, Jennifer Tippins, and Tom Witte	February 3, 2010	117
After a thunderstorm frightens the Umi City Museum's dinosaurs, the team must bring them back to the museum, before a dinosaur expo.
18	18	"Playground Heroes"	Sean McBride and Robert M. Wallace	Soo Kim and Michael T. Smith	Bob Cavin III, Tom Connor, and Rick Ritter	April 22, 2010	118
The team helps to fix the playground after a rainstorm, so Mya and her friends can play.
19	19	"The Butterfly Dance Show"	Sean McBride and Robert M. Wallace	Claudia Silver; Story Contributors : Jeff Borkin and Jennifer Twomey	Bob Algeo, Bob Cavin III, Christopher Jammal, Rick Ritter, and Jennifer Tippins	April 14, 2010	119
The team helps Sophia fix her butterfly costume in time for the Butterfly Dance Show, which her and Milli are competing in.
20	20	"Santa's Little Fixers"	Sean McBride and Robert M. Wallace	P. Kevin Strader and Jennifer Twomey	Bob Algeo, Robert Bandel, Tom Conner, Christopher Jammal, Rick Ritter, and Jennifer Tippins	December 6, 2010	120
On Christmas Eve, the team helps Santa Claus fix his Toy-Making Machine, in time for Christmas.

=== Season 2 (2010–11) ===
No. overall	No. in season	Title	Animation directors	Written by	Storyboard by	Original release date	Prod. code
21	1	"Race Around Umi City"	Sean McBride and Robert M. Wallace	Brian L. Perkins; Story Contributors : Jeff Borkin and Jennifer Twomey	Robert Bandel, Christopher Jammal, Rick Ritter, and Tom Witte	October 18, 2010	201
UmiCar enters a race around Umi City to win the prize—a bunch of balloons—for his friend Sam. But one of the racers is Dump Truck, a big cheater who plays dirty and will stop at nothing to win the race and claim the balloons for himself!
22	2	"Counting Comet"	Sean McBride and Robert M. Wallace	Jeff Borkin	Robert Bandel, Christopher Jammal, Rick Ritter, and Tom Witte	February 25, 2011	202
After a friendly comet named Counting Comet crash-lands on Earth, the team helps him get to the launch pad before the rocket takes off, so he can board it and return home.
23	3	"Purple Monkey Mission"	Sean McBride and Robert M. Wallace	Clark Stubbs	Robert Bandel, Christopher Jammal, Rick Ritter, and Tom Witte	January 11, 2011	203
After a purple monkey arrives at Umi City Zoo and ends up in the wrong exhibit, the team helps him find the right one.
24	4	"Umi Fire Truck"	Sean McBride and Robert M. Wallace	Brian L. Perkins	Robert Bandel, Christopher Jammal, Rick Ritter, and Tom Witte	March 23, 2011	204
The team must rescue Abby, who is too scared to climb down from a treehouse.
25	5	"Umi Toy Store"	Sean McBride and Robert M. Wallace	Adam Peltzman	Robert Bandel, Christopher Jammal, Rick Ritter, and Tom Witte	October 11, 2011	205
The team searches for Colin's missing UmiCents in the toy store, so he can buy a new toy called Sparklepup.
26	6	"The Ghost Family Costume Party"	Sean McBride and Robert M. Wallace	Clark Stubbs	Robert Bandel, Christopher Jammal, Rick Ritter, and Tom Witte	October 25, 2010	206
On Halloween, the team helps Little Ghost solve four riddles, to reach the costume party.
27	7	"Umi Egg Hunt"	Sean McBride and Robert M. Wallace	Brian L. Perkins	Robert Bandel, Christopher Jammal, Rick Ritter, and Tom Witte	April 15, 2011	207
After the most special egg at the Umi City Egg Hunt falls down a rabbit hole, the team travels down the hole to an underground rabbit city to retrieve it, before it gets cooked by the egg processors in the city's egg factory.
28	8	"Crazy Skates"	Sean McBride and Robert M. Wallace	Jeff Borkin	Robert Bandel, Christopher Jammal, Rick Ritter, and Tom Witte	March 21, 2011	208
Milli and Geo must rescue Bot after he accidentally puts on a pair of crazy skates and starts rolling uncontrollably through Umi City!
29	9	"Day at the Museum"	Sean McBride and Robert M. Wallace	Brian L. Perkins	Bob Cavin III, Christopher Jammal, Rick Ritter, Jennifer Tippins, and Tom Witte	January 12, 2011	209
The team searches through the exhibits at the children's museum to find Ellen's star tokens.
30	10	"Shark Car"	Sean McBride and Robert M. Wallace	Jeff Borkin	Robert Bandel, Jeff Hong, Christopher Jammal, Rick Ritter, and Tom Witte	July 15, 2011	210
The team helps Jose retrieve his toy Shark Car, before his family leaves on a ferryboat.
31	11	"Buster the Lost Dog"	Sean McBride and Robert M. Wallace	Clark Stubbs	Robert Bandel, Jeff Hong, Christopher Jammal, Rick Ritter, and Tom Witte	October 12, 2011	211
After a game of fetch goes awry, the team must rescue Anna's dog Buster, who is stuck in a bucket on top of the construction site.
32	12	"Chicks in the City"	Sean McBride and Robert M. Wallace	Brian L. Perkins	Robert Bandel, Jeff Hong, Christopher Jammal, Rick Ritter, and Tom Witte	October 21, 2010	212
The team helps Colin rescue six baby chicks who have recently hatched, and escaped from his school, and into Umi City.
33	13	"The Incredible Presto"	Sean McBride and Robert M. Wallace	Adam Peltzman	Robert Bandel, Jeff Hong, Christopher Jammal, Rick Ritter, and Tom Witte	October 14, 2011	213
After the Incredible Presto becomes trapped in a giant watermelon, the team must save him, in time for his magic show.
34	14	"The Great UmiCar Rescue"	Sean McBride and Robert M. Wallace	Brian L. Perkins	Robert Bandel, Jeff Hong, Christopher Jammal, Rick Ritter, and Tom Witte	January 10, 2011	214
After UmiCar becomes stranded on an iceberg, the team must save him before the ice melts.
35	15	"Milli Saves the Day"	Sean McBride and Robert M. Wallace	Clark Stubbs	Robert Bandel, Christopher Jammal, Rick Ritter, and Tom Witte	March 22, 2011	215
When Geo and Bot get stuck in blobs of honey, and get picked up by Silly Bear, Milli must save them, before Silly Bear bakes them in a honey cake.
36	16	"Super Soap!"	Sean McBride and Robert M. Wallace	Clark Stubbs	Robert Bandel, Jeff Hong, Christopher Jammal, Rick Ritter, and Tom Witte	January 13, 2011	216
After Silly Bear gets covered in glue, causing different things to stick onto him, the team must deliver Super Soap to him, so he can clean it off.
37	17	"Ellee the Elephant"	Sean McBride and Robert M. Wallace	Jeff Borkin	Robert Bandel, Jeff Hong, Christopher Jammal, Rick Ritter, and Tom Witte	March 24, 2011	217
After Ellee the Elephant becomes lost in Umi City, the team helps her get to the circus, in time for her debut.
38–39	18–19	"The King of Numbers"	Sean McBride and Robert M. Wallace	Jeff Borkin	Robert Bandel, Jeff Hong, Christopher Jammal, Rick Ritter, and Tom Witte	October 3, 2011 (Note: This episode was first released on Journey to Numberland DVD on September 6, 2011.)	218-219 (999)
When the team visits the Number Kingdom, they must save its king, "The King of Numbers", after the math-hating wizard, Zilch locks him in his crooked tower, causing numbers to disappear. Note: This episode aired as a 45-minute special.
40	20	"The Legend of the Blue Mermaid"	Sean McBride and Robert M. Wallace	Jennifer Twomey	Robert Bandel, Jeff Hong, Christopher Jammal, Rick Ritter, and Tom Witte	May 13, 2011	220
The team travels to the bottom of the sea, to rescue the Blue Mermaid, who has been captured by Squiddy the Squid, after she leaves a trail of blue scales to lead them to her. Special Guest Star: American Idol winner and R&B singer Jordin Sparks voices the character of the Blue Mermaid.

=== Season 3 (2011–12) ===
No. overall	No. in season	Title	Animation directors	Written by	Storyboard by	Original release date	Prod. code
41	1	"Cuckoo Bears"	Sean McBride and Robert M. Wallace	Jeff Borkin	Robert Bandel, Jeff Hong, John Quack Leard, and Rick Ritter	October 13, 2011	301
After a gush of wind causes the Cuckoo Bears, a band of three bears that live in UmiCity's Cuckoo Clock to lose the gears that power them, the team must fix them, before the clock strikes twelve.
42	2	"Stompasaurus"	Sean McBride and Robert M. Wallace	Clark Stubbs	Robert Bandel, Jeff Hong, John Quack Leard, and Rick Ritter	January 17, 2012	302
After a delivery truck loses the pieces of Wyatt's Stompasaurus toy, the team sets out to retrieve the pieces, and return them to him.
43	3	"Job Well Done!"	Sean McBride and Robert M. Wallace	Christine Ricci, Ph.D.	Robert Bandel, Jeff Hong, John Quack Leard, and Rick Ritter	January 18, 2012	303
The team takes on different jobs around Umi City, to help David earn enough UmiDollars, to buy a Red Racer Bike.
44	4	"Rainy Day Rescue"	Sean McBride and Robert M. Wallace	Clark Stubbs	Robert Bandel, Jeff Hong, John Quack Leard, and Rick Ritter	January 19, 2012	304
The team must rescue baby birds, after the rain washes their nest out of a tree.
45	5	"Shooting Star!"	Sean McBride and Robert M. Wallace	Dustin Ferrer	Robert Bandel, Jeff Hong, John Quack Leard, and Rick Ritter	April 27, 2012	305
Shooting Star is the smallest horse on the ranch, and dreams of being big like the other horses. The team sets out to find four magical horseshoes, that will make him grow.
46	6	"The Umi Sports Games"	Sean McBride and Robert M. Wallace	Billy Lopez and Dustin Ferrer	Robert Bandel, Jeff Hong, John Quack Leard, and Rick Ritter	August 13, 2012 (Note: This episode was first released on Umi Games DVD on June 2, 2012.)	306
The team participates in the Umi Games, and in order to win the Umi Games Trophy, they must defeat their opponents, the Sports Robots in each event.
47	7	"Haircut Hijinx"	Sean McBride and Robert M. Wallace	Clark Stubbs	Robert Bandel, Jeff Hong, John Quack Leard, and Rick Ritter	December 4, 2012	307
When Owen's money blows away, the team sets out to retrieve it, so he can get a haircut.
48	8	"The Great Shape Race"	Sean McBride and Robert M. Wallace	Jeff Borkin	Robert Bandel, Jeff Hong, John Quack Leard, and Rick Ritter	September 28, 2012	308
UmiCar competes in a race to the top of Shape Mountain to win the big prize: a magic Dodecahedron. But his competitor, includes Dump Truck, who will stop at nothing to win!
49	9	"Boardwalk Games"	Sean McBride and Robert M. Wallace	Dustin Ferrer	Robert Bandel, Jeff Hong, John Quack Leard, and Rick Ritter	October 3, 2012	309
The team plays carnival games at the Boardwalk Carnival to earn tickets, so Ryan can win a toy helicopter.
50	10	"Presto's Magic House"	Sean McBride and Robert M. Wallace	Jeff Borkin	Robert Bandel, Jeff Hong, John Quack Leard, and Rick Ritter	May 18, 2012	310
After Presto the Magician accidentally puts his wand in the washing machine, causing magic bubbles to fill the laundry room, he gets trapped in one and the team must travel through his house to rescue him.
51	11	"Let's Play Math Dragons!"	Sean McBride and Robert M. Wallace	Clark Stubbs	Robert Bandel, Jeff Hong, John Quack Leard, and Rick Ritter	December 3, 2012	311
The team plays the video game Math Dragons; to win, they must journey through three levels, and collect all the baby dragon eggs.
52	12	"DoorMouse in Space"	Sean McBride and Robert M. Wallace	Dustin Ferrer	Robert Bandel, Jeff Hong, John Quack Leard, and Rick Ritter	May 25, 2012	312
After DoorMouse is accidentally launched into outer space, the team travels into space to save him, before he crashes into Mars. Special Guest Star: Michael Gargiulo of WNBC in New York City portrays himself as a news reporter.
53	13	"The Kitty Rescue"	Sean McBride and Robert M. Wallace	Dustin Ferrer	Robert Bandel, Jeff Hong, John Quack Leard, and Rick Ritter	September 14, 2012	313
The team travels to Jonathan's house to rescue his kitten, who is stuck inside a well, and cannot get out.
54	14	"Lost and Found Toys"	Sean McBride and Robert M. Wallace	Clark Stubbs	Robert Bandel, Jeff Hong, John Quack Leard, and Rick Ritter	October 4, 2012	314
The team discovers a lost and found box with three toys inside, and sets out to return them to their owners.
55	15	"The Umi City Treasure Hunt"	Sean McBride and Robert M. Wallace	Jeff Borkin	Robert Bandel, Jeff Hong, John Quack Leard, and Rick Ritter	December 5, 2012	315
The team goes on a treasure hunt in search of the three keys, that will open the great math treasure of Umi City.
56	16	"Doctor Bot"	Sean McBride and Robert M. Wallace	Clark Stubbs	Robert Bandel, Jeff Hong, John Quack Leard, and Rick Ritter	October 2, 2012	316
The team sets off to the playground to deliver a bandage to Mike, who has fallen off of his scooter and scraped his knee.
57	17	"Animal School House"	Sean McBride and Robert M. Wallace	Dustin Ferrer	Robert Bandel, Jeff Hong, John Quack Leard, and Rick Ritter	October 1, 2012	317
The team searches for Farmer Dan's animals, who have escaped from his farm to the Umi City Schoolhouse.
58–59	18–19	"Team Umizoomi vs. The Shape Bandit"	Sean McBride and Robert M. Wallace	Jeff Borkin	Robert Bandel, Jeff Hong, John Quack Leard, and Rick Ritter	January 20, 2012	318-319 (998)
The Shape Bandit has been taking shapes from all over Umi City, and after he takes Geo's Shape Belt, the team must reclaim it and save Umi City from the Bandit. Special Guest Star: Michael Gargiulo of WNBC in New York City portrays himself as a news reporter. Note: This episode aired as a 45-minute special.
60	20	"A Sledding Snow Day"	Sean McBride and Robert M. Wallace	Jeff Borkin	Robert Bandel, Jeff Hong, John Quack Leard, and Rick Ritter	December 6, 2012	320
The team sets out to bring a sled to Casey, so she can go sledding.

=== Season 4 (2013–15) ===
No. overall	No. in season	Title	Animation directors	Written by	Storyboard by	Original release date	Prod. code	US viewers (millions)
61	1	"Little Panda Joe"	Sean McBride and Robert M. Wallace	Dustin Ferrer	Robert Bandel, Jeff Hong, and Rick Ritter	June 14, 2013	401	1.65
The team helps a baby panda named Little Joe reunite with his family. Special Guest Star: Michael Gargiulo of WNBC in New York City, portrays himself as a news reporter.
62	2	"The Boy With the Dragon Skateboard"	Sean McBride and Robert M. Wallace	Dustin Ferrer	Robert Bandel, Jeff Hong, and Rick Ritter	February 4, 2013	402	1.61
The team must find the pieces to Logan's broken dragon skateboard when some new antagonists called The TroubleMakers destroy it.
63	3	"City of Lost Penguins"	Sean McBride and Robert M. Wallace	Clark Stubbs	Robert Bandel, Jeff Hong, and Rick Ritter	February 6, 2013	403	1.21
The team must round up fifty lost baby penguins and return them to the zoo, after the TroubleMakers release them into Umi City.
64	4	"UmiCar's Birthday Present"	Sean McBride and Robert M. Wallace	Jeff Borkin	Robert Bandel, Jeff Hong, and Rick Ritter	April 22, 2013	404	1.36
After the TroubleMakers steal UmiCar's present on his birthday, the team must get it back.
65	5	"The Sunshine Fairy"	Sean McBride and Robert M. Wallace	Dustin Ferrer	Robert Bandel, Jeff Hong, and Rick Ritter	May 15, 2013	405	1.69
The team discovers a secret door to a magical and enchanting forest, where they meet Sunny the Sunshine Fairy. After Grog, a jealous goblin, steals her sunshine powers, and takes it to his home in the Deep Dark Swamp, they pursue him in order to retrieve her powers.
66	6	"Robo Tools"	Sean McBride and Robert M. Wallace	Clark Stubbs	Robert Bandel, Jeff Hong, and Rick Ritter	May 13, 2013	406	1.70
The team helps Travis and his mother fix a flat tire, in time for his soccer game.
67	7	"UmiCops!"	Sean McBride and Robert M. Wallace	Clark Stubbs	Robert Bandel, Jeff Hong, and Rick Ritter	January 17, 2014	407	1.76
The chief of police calls upon the team to catch twelve stinkbugs, who are on the loose in Umi City.
68	8	"Gloopy Fly Home"	Sean McBride and Robert M. Wallace	Jeff Borkin	Robert Bandel, Jeff Hong, and Rick Ritter	November 18, 2013	408	1.38
When the alien Gloopy crashlands in Umi City, the team helps him find the space stars that make his spaceship fly, so he can return home.
69	9	"Stolen Lunches"	Sean McBride and Robert M. Wallace	Jeff Borkin	Robert Bandel, Jeff Hong, and Rick Ritter	September 9, 2013	409	1.33
The team must reclaim the children's lunch boxes, after the TroubleMakers steal them.
70	10	"Meatball Madness"	Sean McBride and Robert M. Wallace	Dustin Ferrer	Robert Bandel, Jeff Hong, and Rick Ritter	September 11, 2013	410	1.41
The team must retrieve the red stop button for Chef Mario's Meatball Machine, after the TroubleMakers steal it, causing the machine to overproduce meatballs.
71	12	"Umi Ninjas"	Sean McBride and Robert M. Wallace	Clark Stubbs	Robert Bandel, Jeff Hong, and Rick Ritter	January 15, 2014	411	1.58
After Squiddy steals their ninja trophy, the team teams up with DoorMouse and uses their ninja moves to retrieve it.
72	12	"Umi Grand Prix"	Sean McBride and Robert M. Wallace	Dustin Ferrer	Robert Bandel, Jeff Hong, and Rick Ritter	October 11, 2013	412	1.49
Shark Car and UmiCar team up for the Umi Grand Prix, the biggest race in Umi City, and compete against Shape Bandit, Dump Truck, Squiddy, and the TroubleMakers.
73	13	"Umi Knights"	Sean McBride and Robert M. Wallace	Dustin Ferrer	Robert Bandel, Jeff Hong, and Rick Ritter	April 29, 2014	413	1.81
The team must save the kingdom, by helping Max the Dragon find his glasses.
74	14	"Movie Madness!"	Sean McBride and Robert M. Wallace	Clark Stubbs	Robert Bandel, Jeff Hong, and Rick Ritter	November 20, 2013	414	1.51
After the TroubleMakers steal snacks from a movie theater, the team pursues them through the theater, and its movies, to get them back.
75	15	"Sleeping UmiCar"	Sean McBride and Robert M. Wallace	Clark Stubbs	Robert Bandel, Jeff Hong, and Rick Ritter	September 9, 2014	415	N/A
After Zeppo's sleeping potion causes UmiCar to fall asleep, the team must find the ingredients for a potion needed to awaken him.
76	16	"Lost Fairy Tales in the City"	Sean McBride and Robert M. Wallace	Jeff Borkin	Robert Bandel, Jeff Hong, and Rick Ritter	May 1, 2014	416	1.48
When Zeppo the Wizard's wand zaps a book of fairy tales and releases them into Umi City, the team must find them.
77	17	"Umi Rescue Copter"	Sean McBride and Robert M. Wallace	Dustin Ferrer	Robert Bandel, Jeff Hong, and Rick Ritter	April 24, 2015	417	1.26
The team sets out to rescue Danny the Dolphin, who has hurt his tail and is unable to swim.
78–79	18–19	"Umi Space Heroes"	Sean McBride and Robert M. Wallace	Jeff Borkin	Robert Bandel, Jeff Hong, and Rick Ritter	February 16, 2015	418-419 (997)	1.84
After the TroubleMakers break the moon into four pieces and scatter them across space, the team must retrieve them to reassemble the moon. Note: This episode aired as a 45-minute special.
80	20	"Gizmos Gone Wild!"	Sean McBride and Robert M. Wallace	Clark Stubbs	Robert Bandel, Jeff Hong, and Rick Ritter	September 10, 2014	420	N/A
The team must stop a group of gizmo robots, after they malfunction, and cause chaos at the Umi City Mall.
