= Cathedral High School (New York City) =

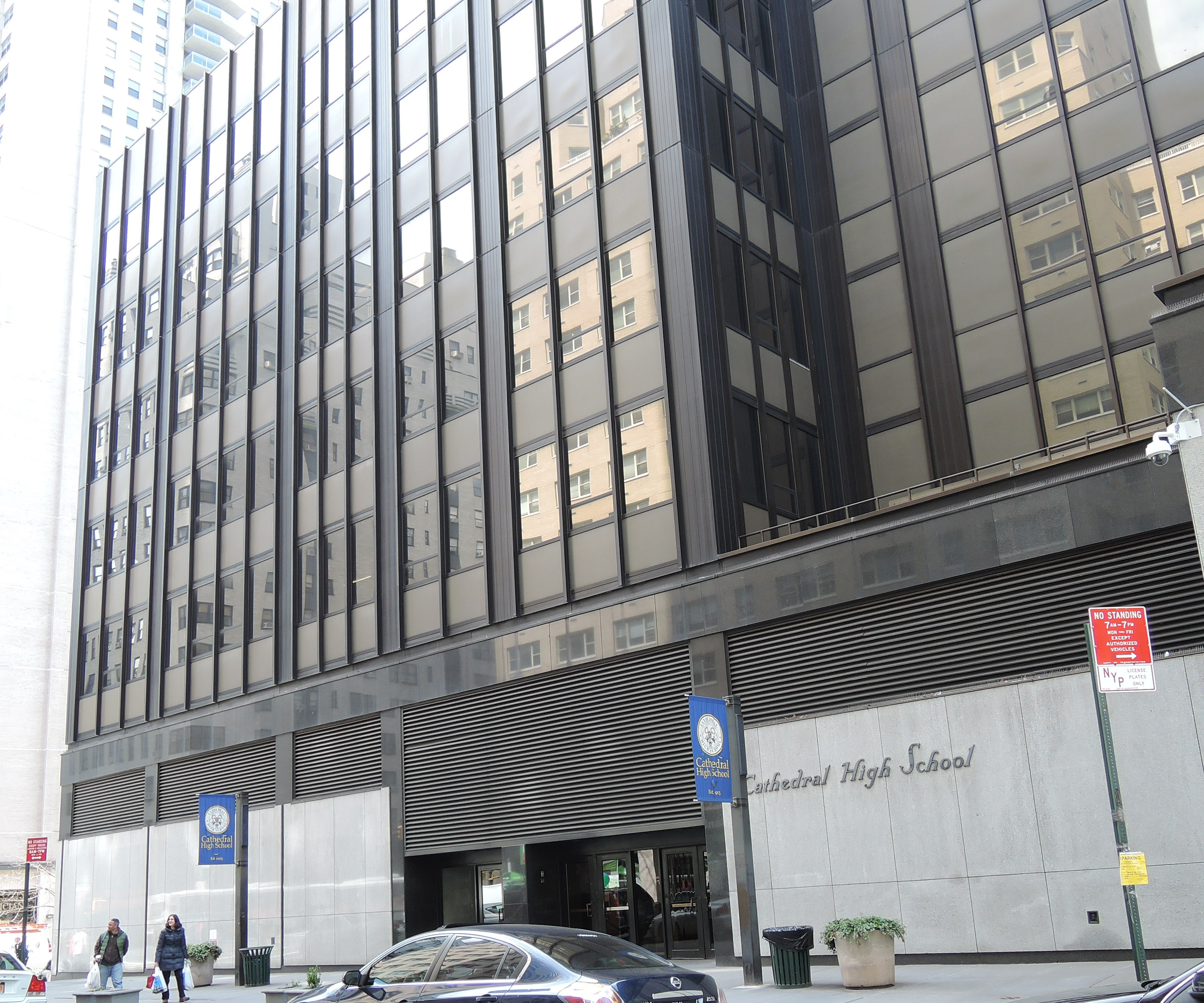
- The high school in 2013, when it was located at 350 East 56th Street

Location
- 116 East 97th St; New York City, New York 10029; United States
- 40.7866°N 73.9511°W

Information
- Type: Catholic school
- Motto: Religio · Mores · Cultura (Religion · Behaviors · Culture)
- Religious affiliation: Roman Catholic
- Established: 1905 (121 years ago)
- Status: Open
- Sister school: All Hallows High School, Cardinal Hayes High School, La Salle Academy, Xavier High School
- Superintendent: Sister Mary Grace Walsh
- School code: 202
- President: Juliette Picciano
- Chairperson: Gina Fonti
- Principal: Jessica Aybar
- Grades: 9–12
- Gender: Girls
- Average class size: 25
- Campus type: Urban
- Colors: Blue and gold
- Slogan: Belong · Believe · Become
- Athletics conference: Catholic High School Athletic Association
- Sports: Basketball (junior varsity and varsity), cheerleading, cross country, flag football, lacrosse (varsity), soccer (varsity), softball (varsity), volleyball
- Mascot: Bear
- Team name: Bears
- Rival: St. Jean Baptiste High School
- Accreditation: Middle States Association of Colleges and Schools
- School fees: Registration: $200; student and book fee: $800
- Tuition: $13,000
- Website: www.cathedralhs.org

Cathedral High School was an American all-girls', private Catholic high school in the borough of Manhattan in New York City, New York It was located within the Archdiocese of New York and closed in 2026.

== History ==
The school was established in 1905 by the Sisters of Charity. In 1973, the high school moved to East 56th Street into the newly built Terence Cardinal Cooke Building that served as administrative offices the Archdiocese of New York and also housed the Church of St. John the Evangelist.

In 2023, it moved from 56th Street into a four-story building on East 97th Street owned by the St. Francis de Sales Parish that was previously occupied by the Marymount School of New York.

In September 2025, the school's board of trustees announced that it would close permanently after the 2025–2026 school year, citing high operating costs and declining enrollment.

== Admissions and curriculum ==
A course on religion was mandatory on an annual basis. However, enrollment was open to young women of all cultures and faiths.

The school offered college preparatory courses as well as Advanced Placement classes including biology, calculus, English, history, literature, physics, and Spanish.

== Notable alumni ==
- Lynda Baquero (born 1967) – television news journalist with local station WNBC
- Ursula Burns (born 1958) – president and CEO of Xerox
- Eileen Egan (1912–2000) – journalist and peace activist
- Ninfa Segarra (born 1950) – last president of the New York City Board of Education
- Vernee Watson-Johnson (born 1949) - Actress
