= Ninfa Segarra =

American lawyer

President of the New York City Board of Education
- In office 2000–2002
- Preceded by: Bill Thompson

New York City Deputy Mayor for Education and Human Services
- In office 1993–2000

Member of the New York City Board of Education
- In office 1990–2002

Personal details
- Born: June 4, 1950 (age 76) New York City, New York, U.S.
- Party: Democratic
- Children: 2, including Alynda Segarra
- Education: New York University (BA); New York Law School (JD)
- Occupation: Lawyer

Ninfa Segarra (born June 4, 1950) is an American lawyer who was the last President of the New York City Board of Education, serving from 2000 to 2002 when the Board was abolished by the State of New York and power of the city schools was transferred to Mayor Michael Bloomberg.

== Early life and education ==
Ninfa Segarra was born on June 4, 1950, to working-class Puerto Rican parents and grew up in the LaGuardia Houses in Two Bridges, Manhattan. She attended Our Lady of Sorrows parochial school and Cathedral High School. In the ninth grade, she began joining protests championing Latino rights. While attending New York University (NYU) for undergrad, she worked for the ASPIRA Association, a left leaning group that works to empower Latino youth. She received her bachelor's in 1973 and attended New York Law School, graduating in 1982.

== Career ==
Following her graduation from law school, Segarra was appointed by Mayor Ed Koch to the Mayor's Office of the Handicapped and to the Voter Assistance Commission as executive director.

In 1990, then Bronx Borough President Fernando Ferrer appointed Segarra to the Board of Education having promised to appoint a Latina with children in the school system during his election campaign. On the Board, Segarra became a voice for conservative social values, most notably her role in ousting Schools Chancellor Joseph A. Fernandez. Segarra voted with the conservative bloc of the Board of Education on Resolution 33, which required that the AIDS education curriculum focus on abstinence. She opposed the Children of the Rainbow First Grade Curriculum that Fernandez supported because she claimed it allowed teaching explicit descriptions of sex. She also later noted that she regretted voting against a parental opt-out provision for condom access in schools. Segarra's vote shifted the balance of power on the Board of Education. As a result, the Children of the Rainbow curriculum was never enacted. Segarra's voting record led Fernandez to call her a "political prostitute". She again voted with the conservatives to cancel Fernandez's contract in 1993. She later ran afoul of Ferrer, who asked her to resign. She dismissed the calls for her resignation and endorsed Rudy Giuliani for mayor in 1993.

After being elected mayor in 1993, Giuliani's first appointment was of Segarra as a Deputy Mayor for Education and Human Services of New York City. As deputy mayor, Segarra oversaw education, health, and youth issues for the mayor, along with community outreach. Critics took issue with her appointment citing her lack of experience in the diverse fields and experience running only a small city agency. Giuliani also appointed Segarra as one of his two appointees to the Board of Education in 1993. Serving in two government roles placed Segarra in a political spotlight. Critics cited a conflict of interest, saying that deputy mayors are beholden to the mayoral administration and by holding that role, Segarra wouldn't effectively advocate for children of the city. In 2000, she became President of the Board and supported its abolition by Giuliani in 2001. In total, Ms. Segarra served on the Board of Education from July 1990 to June 2002.

Segarra stepped down as deputy mayor in 2000 to assume a position at the City University of New York (CUNY) as vice president for intercampus collaboration. She became the executive director of the New York City Police Museum in 2002 after being unable to provide her work schedules at CUNY in response to a request filed by the faculty union.

== Personal life ==
Segarra met her husband, Jose Segarra while attending NYU. The couple later had two children, Pablo (born 1983) and Alynda (born 1987). The couple separated in 1989. Alynda later formed and fronted the band Hurray for the Riff Raff.

Preceded by William C. Thompson Jr.	President of the New York City Board of Education; 2000 – 2002	Succeeded by Office Abolished
