= Ida Siegal =

American television journalist (born 1977)

- Born: Ida Justine Siegal; November 5, 1977 (age 48); New York City, New York, U.S.
- Occupations: Television news, reporter

Ida Siegal (born November 5, 1977) is an American television journalist who has been an on-air news reporter for NBC New York since January 2003. She has covered a number of prominent stories during her career, such as the Howard Beach bias attack, the December 2005 transit strike, and the Blizzard of 2003.

== Education ==
Siegal graduated magna cum laude from the S. I. Newhouse School of Public Communications at Syracuse University with a double major in broadcast journalism and public policy.

== Career ==
Beginning in 1999 and continuing until she joined WNBC, Siegal worked as a reporter and anchor at News 12 in the Bronx. Among the stories she covered during this period were the September 11 attacks, the trial of police officers indicted for the killing of Amadou Diallo. While at News 12 in the Bronx, she also served as a reporter for News 12 Long Island, where she covered education, crime and politics. She is also an Author of the children's book series Emma is on the air.
