= Melba Tolliver =

American journalist

- Born: Melba Tolliver; December 8, 1938 (age 87); Rome, Georgia, United States
- Occupation: Journalist
- Years active: 1967–1994

Melba Tolliver (born December 8, 1939) is an American journalist and former New York City news anchor and reporter. She is best remembered for her defiant stance against ABC owned WABC-TV when she refused to don a wig or scarf to cover up her Afro in order to cover the White House wedding of President Richard Nixon's daughter Tricia Nixon in 1971.

== Life and career ==
Tolliver was born in Rome, Georgia.

She worked as a registered nurse and later became a secretary at ABC in November 1966. Strikes by the American Federation of Television and Radio Artists in April 1967 and by the National Association of Broadcast Employees and Technicians in September led to short stints where Tolliver filled in for Marlene Sanders.

Tolliver later became a full-time reporter and anchor at WABC from 1967 to 1976. In the early 1970s, she was a recurring panelist on What's My Line? In 1976, she went to WNBC where she remained until 1980. She also worked at News 12 Long Island from 1986 to 1994. With Pia Lindstrom she was also half of the first all female co-anchor team in the New York television market.

Tolliver has co-hosted, with Gil Noble, ABC's Like It Is series which focused upon the Black Community. Tolliver has a blog on her website and is working on a book about her experiences in the media. She is also featured in the documentary, "In Our Heads About Our Hair." In 2015 Tolliver received a Distinguished Alumni Award from Empire State College.

Among the American news personalities who were inspired and or influenced by Tolliver was PBS News Hour anchor Gwen Ifill.

In 2015 Tolliver received the Distinguished Alumni Award from her Alma Mater, Empire State University.

== Book ==
In 2024 Tolliver published the book "Accidental Anchorwoman: A Memoir of Chance, Choice, Change and Connection" (IngramSpark).. The volume was the recipient of the 2024 "Outstanding Book" award from NABJ (National Association of Black Journalists).

Wayne Dawkins writing of the volume in the periodical American Journalism reposted on TandFonline describes the tome as "A bird's-eye analysis of civil rights flashpoints, plus the changes that occurred during the television news media's adolescence".
