= Baruch Houses =

Public housing development in Manhattan, New York

- NYCHA property
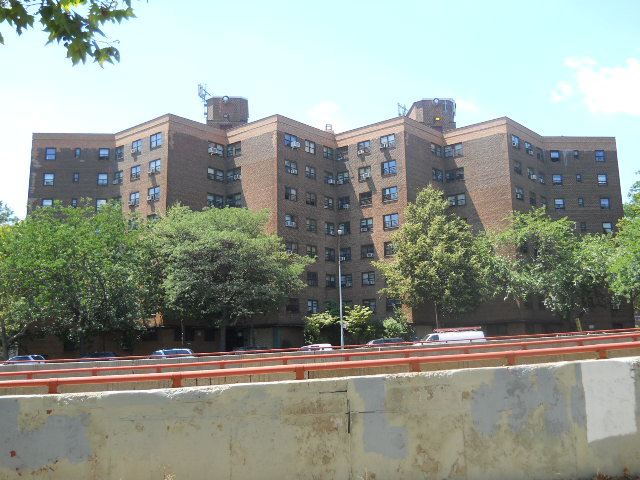
- Baruch Houses in 2011
- Interactive map of Baruch Houses
- Coordinates: 40.7175°N 73.9772°W
- Country: United States
- State: New York
- City: New York City
- Borough: Manhattan

Area
  - Total: 0.042 sq mi (0.11 km^{2})

Population
  - Total: 5,101
  - Density: 120,000/sq mi (47,000/km^{2})
- ZIP codes: 10002
- Area codes: 212, 332, 646, and 917
- Website: my.nycha.info/DevPortal/

Bernard M. Baruch Houses, or Baruch Houses, is a public housing development built by the New York City Housing Authority (NYCHA) on the Lower East Side of Manhattan. Baruch Houses is bounded by Franklin D. Roosevelt East River Drive to the east, E. Houston Street to the north, Columbia Street to the west, and Delancey Street to the south. The complex, the largest NYCHA development in Manhattan, occupies 27.64 acres (111,900 m^{2}) (equivalent to fifteen blocks), of which buildings cover 13.4%, a percentage similar to that of most "tower in the park" project designs. It has 2,194 apartments, which house an estimated 5,397 people. These apartments are distributed throughout 17 buildings. Baruch Houses I is seven stories tall, Baruch Houses XI, XIII, and XV are thirteen stories tall, and the rest (II-X, XII, XIV, XVI-XVII) are fourteen stories tall. Combined, these buildings have 2.9 million square feet (270,000 m^{2}).

Baruch Houses Addition, or Baruch Addition, is an eighteenth building for seniors, built in 1977. Baruch Addition is located on Columbia Street, at the start of Rivington Street, and has 197 units in twenty-three stories.

== Development ==
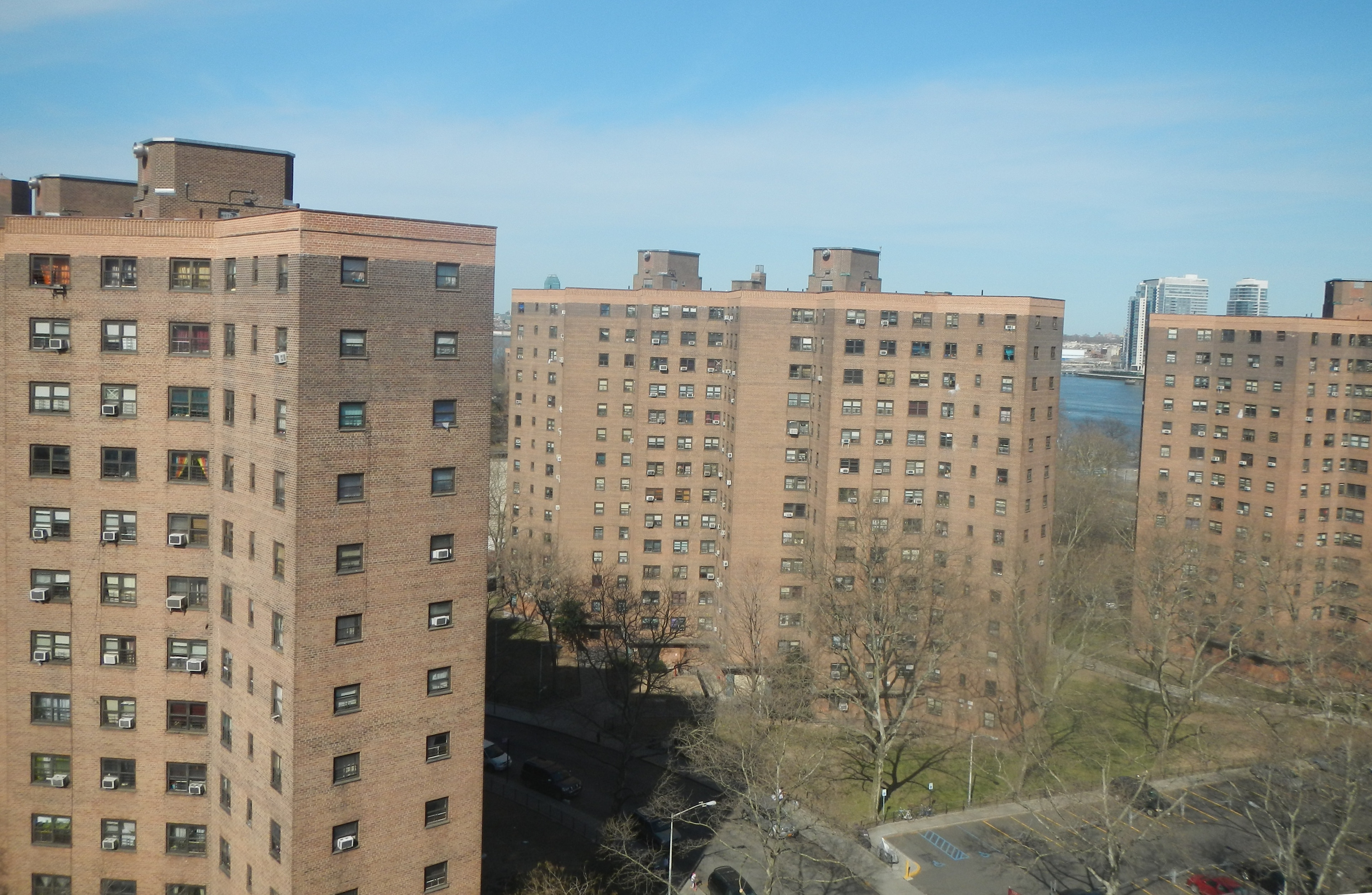
The Baruch Houses from the Williamsburg Bridge

The Baruch Houses were designed by Emery Roth & Sons and was completed June 30, 1959. Between the construction of LaGuardia Houses and Baruch Houses, 1,650 people were displaced in 1953–1954. It is named after Bernard Baruch, a Wall Street trader, economic advisor during World War I and World War II, and confidant to six presidents.

In 2013, the Baruch Houses were included in mayor Michael Bloomberg's 80/20 infill plan that would lease the development's open space to housing developers to create 80% market rate housing and 20% affordable housing. In 2015, under Bill de Blasio, the plan changed to 50/50 infill. The infill plan is intended to fund the $241.9 million the development needs for repairs. NYCHA tenants and affordable housing advocates oppose the plan.

After Hurricane Sandy, NYCHA received $355 million from the city to repair properties damaged by the storm in 2017. The Baruch Houses improvements include new roofs, flood proofing, installation of full back-up power generators, new heat and hot water service, restoration of the playgrounds. Architects Nelligan White designed elevated central heating plant and outbuildings for backup generation system as part of this plan.

Roberto Napoleon is the Resident Association President for Baruch Houses. Samuel Manguel is the Resident Association President for Baruch Houses Addition.

== Notable people ==
Ursula M. Burns (born 1958), businesswoman and former chairman and CEO of Xerox.

== See also ==
- New York City Housing Authority
- List of New York City Housing Authority properties
