= LaGuardia Houses =

Public housing development in Manhattan, New York

- NYCHA property
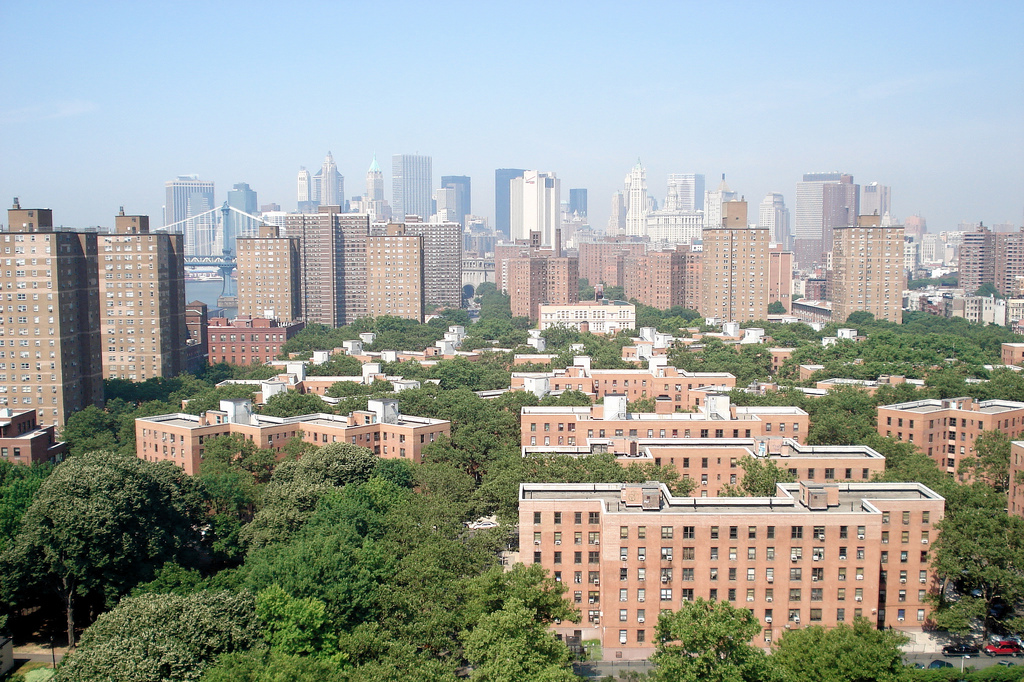
- LaGuardia Houses in 2008
- Interactive map of LaGuardia Houses
- Coordinates: 40.712630°N 73.987260°W
- Country: United States
- State: New York
- City: New York City
- Borough: Manhattan

Area
  - Total: 0.016 sq mi (0.041 km^{2})

Population
  - Total: 2,513
  - Density: 160,000/sq mi (61,000/km^{2})
- ZIP codes: 10002
- Area codes: 212, 332, 646, and 917
- Website: my.nycha.info/DevPortal/

Mayor Fiorello H. LaGuardia Houses, also known as LaGuardia Houses, is a public housing development built and maintained by the New York City Housing Authority (NYCHA) in Two Bridges, Manhattan. Mayor Fiorello H. LaGuardia Houses is composed of nine buildings, all of which are fifteen or sixteen stories tall. The buildings have 1,093 apartments and house approximately 2,596 people. The complex occupies 10.96 acres (4.44 ha), and is bordered by Madison Street to the north, Montgomery Street to the east, Cherry Street to the south, and Rutgers Street to the west. LaGuardia Houses Addition is a sixteen-story tower for elderly people at the corner of Jefferson Street and Cherry Street.

== Development ==
Between the construction of LaGuardia Houses and Baruch Houses, 1,650 people were displaced in 1953–1954. Mayor Fiorello H. LaGuardia Houses was completed July 31, 1957 and the nine buildings were designed by Hyman Isaac Feldman. LaGuardia Houses Addition was completed in 1965 and was designed by Emanuel Turano. The development is named after Fiorello H. LaGuardia, the 99th Mayor of New York City who created the New York City Housing Authority and, although he was a Republican and President Franklin D. Roosevelt was a Democrat, worked closely with President Roosevelt to gain federal funding for projects throughout New York City.

The property was damaged by Hurricane Sandy in 2012 by saltwater flooding 6-24 inches on the ground floors of four buildings. In 2015, it received part of $3 billion aid from the Federal Emergency Management Administration (FEMA) for NYCHA properties.

In 2017, NYCHA began soliciting proposals from developers to build affordable and market-rate housing units at LaGuardia Houses as part of the agency' part "NextGeneration Neighborhoods" program intended to fund repairs. It was estimated that the development needs $70 million in capital improvements. Construction was planned to begin in 2019.

As of 2010, Jessica Thomas is the current Resident Association President for Mayor Fiorello H. LaGuardia Houses and Carmelo Lopez is the current Resident Association President for LaGuardia Houses Addition.

== Notable residents ==
- Ninfa Segarra (1950–), last President of the New York City Board of Education

== See also ==
- New York City Housing Authority
