= Lynda Baquero =

American journalist

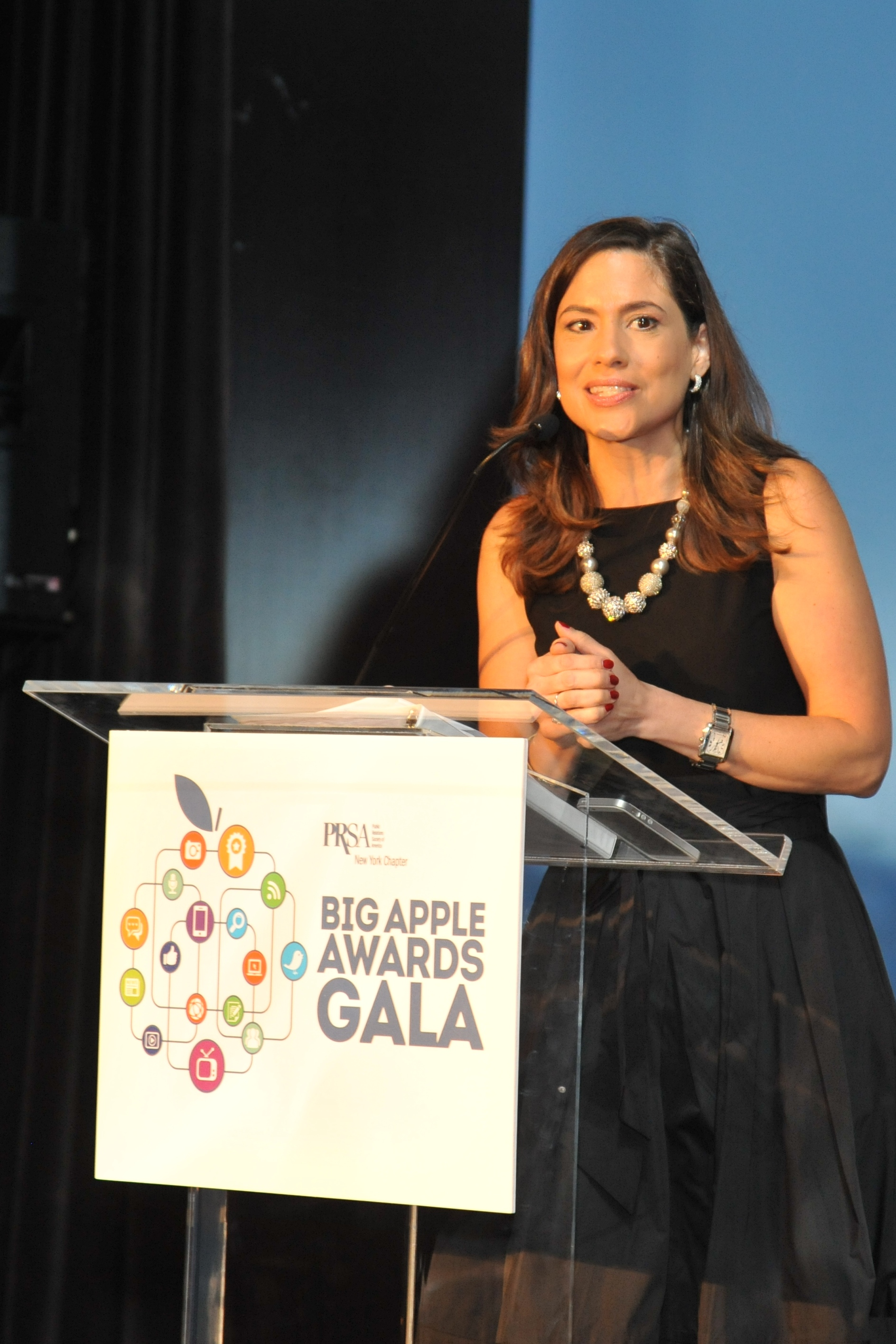
- Born: Lynda LaVergne; January 16, 1967 (age 59); New York City, US
- Education: New York University
- Occupation: Reporter/Correspondent for WNBC
- Children: 2

Lynda Baquero (born January 16, 1967) is an American correspondent for the National Broadcasting Company's flagship station in New York City. Baquero handles consumer reports for WNBC through her "Better Get Baquero" segment but has also covered the economy and tourism in Puerto Rico plus the Olympic Games in Atlanta and Salt Lake City. Traveling through the Caribbean to such places as Puerto Rico, Haiti and the Dominican Republic, she has provided coverage of various tropical storms such as Hurricane Georges that have battered the region.

== Career and personal life ==
Baquero joined Channel 4 in 1995 from local cable news network NY1 News where she was a daily news anchor and consumer reporter for three years. At NY1, Baquero was one of two-dozen "video journalists" responsible for researching, writing, shooting and editing her own stories. Prior to NY1, Baquero was at local station WCBS for five years working in almost every aspect of the newsroom ranging from desk assistant, to researcher, to assignment editor, and finally associate producer of the daily consumer action segment, "Troubleshooter". Baquero has also worked as an associate producer of "NELY!" a talk show produced at WCAU in Philadelphia as well as for Telemundo where she wrote and co-produced various Spanish-language network specials.

A year after joining the WNBC news team, Baquero was named co-anchor of the station’s popular weekend editions of their news feature program Today in New York. She hosted that program for two years before moving to hosting the station's weekend evening newscasts. She has also served as co-anchor of News 4 New York at 6PM with David Ushery and as co-anchor of NewsChannel 4 at 6PM with Chuck Scarborough.

Baquero was the recipient of the 1998 local Emmy Award for "Religious Programming" for her reports on the Pope John Paul II's historic visit to Cuba. In 2007 she received her second Emmy Award for "Best Evening Newscast" along with Chuck Scarborough. In addition to the Pope's visit to Cuba, she also traveled to the Middle East to cover the Pope's visit to the Holy Land.

Born and raised in Manhattan, Baquero is of Puerto Rican ancestry. She lives in Manhattan with her husband, whom she has been married to since 1997, and their two daughters. She is a graduate of Cathedral High School and New York University where she received a Bachelor of Arts degree in broadcast journalism. In addition to English, she is fluent in Spanish and French.
