= Rob Morrison (journalist) =

American television journalist and news anchor

- Occupation: Journalist
- Years active: Since early 1990s
- Spouse: Ashley Morrison
- Children: 1

Rob Morrison is an American former television journalist and news anchor.

== Career ==
Morrison began his broadcasting career as a combat correspondent while serving in the U.S. Marine Corps. He was a radio disc jockey and news anchor and reporter while stationed on Okinawa, Japan, in the early 1990s. As a civilian, he began his career at WGMC-TV in Worcester, Massachusetts. He later worked at WWLP-TV in Springfield, Massachusetts, and in Hartford, Connecticut. As a foreign correspondent, he reported from Iraq and Qatar during the Second Gulf War; Afghanistan, where he embedded with the Marines during Operation Enduring Freedom in 2001; and Haiti.

In 1999, Morrison began a nine-year period at WNBC, the New York City, flagship station of the NBC television network. There he co-anchored Today in New York and Weekend Today in New York, the station's early-morning, local-news-and-entertainment television program. In 2001, Morrison moved to the station's weekend-evening newscasts.

In 2004, he was made a co-anchor of the weekday edition of Today in New York, alongside Darlene Rodriguez, and stayed in that position until 2008 when he left the station. During Morrison's time with WNBC, he also served as a correspondent for NBC News, as well as a news reader for Weekend Today, also an early-morning, news-and-entertainment television program and a production of NBC News.

After leaving WNBC and NBC, Morrison wrote a blog, Daddy Diaries – Confessions of a Stay-at-Home Anchorman, which was published on The Huffington Post, a news website and content-aggregating blog.

In 2009, he joined WCBS, a local broadcast-television station also located in New York City – and the flagship station of the CBS broadcast-television network – where Morrison has anchored the station's morning and evening weekend newscasts. On December 20, 2010, he was named co-anchor, with Mary Calvi, of the weekday editions of CBS 2 News This Morning, the station's early-morning news program, and on newscasts beginning January 3, 2011.

On February 20, 2013, Morrison resigned from his $300,000-a-year position at WCBS-TV.

== Personal life ==
His wife, Ashley Morrison (née Risk), a business anchor for CBS MoneyWatch, was an anchor and reporter with Bloomberg Television from 2007 to 2009. In 2011, the couple and their son, Jack, moved from Manhattan to Darien, Connecticut.

== Legal troubles ==
=== Domestic violence ===
Morrison was arrested in his home at approximately 1:30 a.m. Sunday, February 17, 2013, and charged with second-degree strangulation, second-degree threatening and disorderly conduct for allegedly choking his wife. Judge Kenneth Povodator defined a protective order against him, forbidding contact with his wife and to remain 100 yards away from her. On July 3, 2013, Morrison pleaded guilty to threatening and breach of peace charges and the strangulation charge was dropped in April 2014.

=== Harassment call charges ===
Morrison was arrested again on Monday, June 17, 2014, after calling his wife Ashley Morrison more than 100 times over several days the previous month. He was charged with criminal violation of a protection order and second-degree harassment after turning himself in on a warrant about 6PM. He later pleaded guilty to harassment charges against his wife Ashley in October 2014 and he was sentenced to six months probation.

== See also ==
- Lists of journalists
- List of people from Connecticut
- List of people from Massachusetts
- List of people from New York City
- List of television reporters
- Media in New York City
