= Bronx High School for the Visual Arts =

Public school in New York City

Coordinates: 40°51′05″N 73°51′53″W

Location
- 2040 Antin Place; Bronx, NY 10462; United States

Information
- Type: Public
- Established: 2002
- Founder: John Gunn
- School district: 11
- Principal: Iris Witherspoon
- Grades: 9 - 12
- Enrollment: 348
- Affiliation: Lehman College Art Gallery; Bronx Museum of the Arts; Wave Hill
- Admission: Unscreened
- Tuition: None
- Website: www.bhsva418.com

The Bronx High School for the Visual Arts (BHSVA), familiarly known as Visual Arts, is a New York City public high school established as an art school in 2002 under Mayor Michael Bloomberg's Small Schools Initiative program (officially, the New Century High Schools Initiative). It is a New Visions for Public Schools institution which oversees funding for the various small schools created by the program but is served by the New York City Department of Education. The school once was housed in the Christopher Columbus Educational Campus before moving to the old Mercy College Bronx campus building in late 2004. The school is within walking distance of the Bronx Zoo and the New York Botanical Garden.

Since its inception in 2002, Visual Arts has hosted consecutive End of the Year art exhibitions at the Lehman College Art Gallery, highlighting the years best art by students.
As of 2005, it also holds a second art exhibition at the Bronx Museum of the Arts.

== In popular culture ==
The school hosted Mayor Bloomberg's 2005 address focusing on the success of the city's newly formed small high-schools and the creation of even more. 56k 300k
