= Pyburn Films =

Pyburn Films is a television and film production company in New York City that specializes in original content and long-form programming.

== Information ==
Pyburn Films also conceived and created AXIS Graphics. The technology and privately held company (AXIS Graphics, LLC) was acquired in January 2008 by the Chyron Corporation. Pyburn Films is an Emmy Award-winning entertainment company. They are located in New York City's Time Square. They are a company that is known for image branding, content development, and new technology. Altogether, Pyburn Films has created over a hundred hours of cable and broadcast television original programming. The Pyburn Film team includes software developers and technology specialists.
