= Today in New York =

Local television morning show on WNBC in New York City

- Also known as: Today in NY (alternate title); Weekend Today in New York "Saturday/Sunday Today in New York" (weekend editions)
- Presented by: Weekdays: Darlene Rodriguez; Michael Gargiulo; Weekends: Pat Battle; Gus Rosendale
- Theme music composer: Groove Worx
- Opening theme: "L.A. Groove"
- Country of origin: United States
- Original language: English

Production
- Production locations: Studio 3K, NBC Studios, 30 Rockefeller Center, New York City, New York
- Camera setup: Multi-camera
- Running time: 150 minutes (weekdays); 120 minutes (Saturdays); 180 Minutes (Sundays)

Original release
- Network: WNBC
- Release: 1988

Today in New York, often abbreviated to Today in NY, is a local morning news and entertainment television program airing on WNBC, an NBC owned-and-operated television station in New York City. The program is broadcast each weekday morning from 4:30 to 7 a.m. Eastern Time, immediately preceding NBC's Today. Weekend editions of the program (branded as Weekend Today in New York) also air on Saturdays in two one-hour blocks from 6 to 7 a.m. and 8:30 to 9:30 a.m.; and on Sundays in one two-hour block from 5:30 to 8:00 a.m. and one one-hour block from 9:30 to 10:30 a.m. (with Weekend Today airing in between the two Saturday blocks and Sunday Today with Willie Geist airing in between the two Sunday blocks).

The program maintains a general format of news stories, traffic reports and weather forecasts, but also includes sports summaries, and entertainment and feature segments. The local news cut-ins broadcast during Today (at approximately :26 and :56 minutes past the hour) are also branded as Today in New York. During the weekday edition, the anchors traditionally sign off with the sentence "The Today Show is next. That's what happening today in New York."

== Broadcast history ==
Prior to becoming a full-fledged program, Today in New York existed as a brief summary of news headlines, weather, and sports, airing on WNBC-TV immediately preceding Today and usually running between five and 15 minutes in length. Beginning in 1983, with the launch of NBC News at Sunrise, Today in New York became a half-hour pre-taped interview show emphasising public affairs and light topics, which ran at 6:00 a.m., prior to Sunrise at 6:30. In 1987 Today in New York returned to a news update format, and aired at 6:45 a.m. following the network business news show Before Hours.

When Before Hours was canceled by NBC in 1988, Today in New York was expanded to 30 minutes. Gradual expansions of the show's runtime followed: to one hour (6 to 7 a.m.) in 1990; to 90 minutes (starting at 5:30 a.m.) in 1994; to two hours (starting at 5:00 a.m.) by 1999; and to two-and-a-half hours (starting at 4:30 a.m.) in 2010. The program expanded to its current three-hour runtime (starting at 4:00 a.m.) on July 31, 2017. But on January 16, 2024, the program went back to 4:30.

== Notable personalities ==
Jane Hanson served as the original anchor of the program. After being removed from the anchor desk of Live at Five in 1992, Tony Guida briefly co-anchored the program followed by Matt Lauer from 1992 to 1994 and Mary Civiello in 1997. Maurice DuBois followed as a co-anchor until he left for WCBS-TV in 2004; he was replaced by Rob Morrison.

Hanson, who remained with the station until November 2006 and later returned to WNBC as host of New York Live, was replaced by Darlene Rodriguez in 2003. After Morrison's departure in June 2008, Michael Gargiulo became co-anchor of the program.

=== Current ===
==== Today in New York ====
- Michael Gargiulo – co-anchor
- Maria LaRosa – meteorologist
- Darlene Rodriguez – co-anchor
- Adelle Caballero – traffic reporter

==== Weekend Today in New York ====
- Pat Battle – co-anchor
- Gus Rosendale - co-anchor
- Raphael Miranda – meteorologist; also MegaPhone interactive trivia host

=== Former personalities ===
- Lynda Baquero – weekend anchor (still at WNBC)
- Contessa Brewer - weekend anchor (now at CNBC)
- Fran Charles – weekday sports anchor (now at MLB Network)
- Maurice DuBois – weekday anchor (now at WCBS-TV)
- Tony Guida – former weekday anchor (now at WCBS-AM)
- Carolyn Gusoff – weekend anchor; then Sunday anchor; and back as weekend anchor (now at WCBS-TV and WLNY)
- Jane Hanson – original weekday anchor
- Janice Huff – weekend meteorologist (still at WNBC as Chief Meteorologist)
- Matt Lauer – former weekday anchor (later anchored WNBC's Live at Five and for NBC News at Today)
- Otis Livingston – weekday sports director (now at WCBS-TV and WLNY-TV)
- Kaitlin Monte – MegaPhone interactive trivia host (later with KRIV in Houston)
- Rob Morrison – weekend anchor (1999 to 2004) and then weekday anchor (2004 to 2008)
- Perri Peltz – weekend anchor
- Felicia Taylor – weekend anchor
- David Ushery – weekend anchor (still at WNBC)
- Joe Witte – former meteorologist (now a researcher at the Spaceflight Center)
- Katherine Creag – field reporter, (died 2021)

== See also ==
- Today in L.A. – a similar morning news and entertainment program on sister station KNBC in Los Angeles, California.
- NBC News
