= Team Umizoomi =

American animated fantasy musical children's television series

- Also known as: Umizoomi
- Genre: Children's; Preschool; Musical; Adventure; Comedy; Educational
- Created by: Soo Kim; Michael T. Smith; Jennifer Twomey
- Developed by: Teri Weiss
- Directed by: Matt Sheridan
- Voices of: Sophia Fox; Madeleine Rose Yen; Ethan Kempner; Juan Mirt; Donovan Patton; P.T. Walkley
- Theme music composer: Mary Wood; Scott Hollingsworth; P.T. Walkley
- Composers: Frisbee N.Y.C; Mary Wood; Scott Hollingsworth; P.T. Walkley; Sachar Mathias; WalkWorth
- Country of origin: United States
- Original language: English
- No. of seasons: 4
- No. of episodes: 80 (list of episodes)

Production
- Executive producers: Jennifer Twomey; Soo Kim
- Producers: Soo Kim (S1–2); Michael T. Smith (S1)
- Running time: 24 minutes (regular); 45 minutes (specials)
- Production companies: Curious Pictures; Nickelodeon Productions

Original release
- Network: Nickelodeon
- Release: January 25, 2010 – April 24, 2015

Team Umizoomi is an American live-action animated musical preschool children's television series created by Soo Kim, Michael T. Smith, and Jennifer Twomey, and developed by Teri Weiss. Twomey and Kim additionally serve as executive producers, and Kim also serves as a producer with Smith and Marcy Pritchard. The series places an emphasis on mathematical concepts, such as counting, sequences, shapes, patterns, measurements, and equalities. Team Umizoomi debuted on January 25, 2010 on Nickelodeon, with "The Kite Festival" and "The Aquarium Fix-It", and ended on April 24, 2015, with "Umi Rescue Copter". Four seasons with a total of 77 episodes were made.

== Premise and format ==
The series follows the adventures of the titular Team Umizoomi, a trio of tiny superheroes who use mathematics to solve whatever problems occur in and around their home of UmiCity in every episode.

Similar to another Curious Pictures production, Little Einsteins, the show combines live-action with animation, featuring innovative and creative combinations of 2D animation, 3D computer animation, Adobe Flash Professional, Adobe Illustrator, Adobe Audition, Adobe After Effects, Adobe Premiere Pro, Adobe Photoshop and other software. It utilizes a combination of live actors and props with animated characters, vehicles and environments.

The animation style takes visual cues from Korean culture, as stated by co-creator Soo Kim, who imbued the show with her Korean heritage.

== Characters ==
=== Main ===
- Milli (voiced by Sophia Fox in the first season and Madeleine Rose Yen in the second, third, and fourth seasons) is a 6-year-old girl. She has abilities related to patterns and measuring. By singing certain phrases, she can use patterns to solve problems. She is often the one to lead the team in many of their missions. In addition to being able to change the pattern of her dress, Milli can also alter the appearance of another object or person to match whatever pattern she is projecting on it, and her ponytails can extend to serve as measuring tools, such as a ruler, a weighing scale, and a thermometer. Later seasons would make Milli extra proficient at martial arts, primarily when it comes to jumps and karate chops, in addition to obtaining her super harness.
- Geo (voiced by Ethan Kempner in the first three seasons and Juan Mirt in the fourth season) is Milli's 8-year-old brother. His singing voice is provided by Brody Bett. He mainly solves problems based on shapes and can use them to make different kinds of objects, ranging from food, tools, and clothing to animals, vehicles, and buildings. For these purposes, he always has usage of his shape belt, which grants him the ability to summon any shape he needs. Later seasons would give him two more tools; the shape splitter, a longsword that can cut a shape into any form needed, and the shape magnet, a horseshoe magnet that can function as a grappling hook by attaching to any specific shape. He wears a pair of roller skates, and he rarely takes them off on dry land.
- Bot (voiced by Donovan Patton) is a green robot who can extend his limbs to reach things or use the screen on his belly (referred to as his "belly screen") to make calls and do math. He is Milli and Geo's primary caretaker, and as a robot features many retractable tools.
- UmiCar (voiced by P.T. Walkley) is the car that drives the team wherever their help is needed. He primarily communicates via engine noises that sound like a cat purring through an electronic filter, though he can pronounce his name with a clear and deep voice on rare occasions. He lacks a face in the first fifteen episodes of the first series and he gains a face in three episodes of the first series.

=== Recurring ===
- DumpTruck is a living dump truck who doesn't speak real words and doesn't play fair.
- The Shape Bandit (voiced by P.T. Walkley) is a sneaky bandit cat who, as his name implies, steals shapes.
- Squiddy (voiced by Chris Phillips) is a squid who creates all sorts of inventions.
- The TroubleMakers (voiced by Nick Heatherington and Jason Harris) are two mischievous foes who, with the use of their TroubleRays, stir up all sorts of trouble in Umi City and often sabotage Team Umizoomi in their tracks.
  - TroubleTruck is the duo's transportation unit.
- DoorMouse (voiced in early episodes by Joe Narcisco and in later episodes by Chris Phillips) is a helpful friend who guards all the doors of Umi City. He also guards bridges, animals, and anything that needs guarding. Although he may sometimes get a little confused, he usually helps the Team on their missions and knows he can rely on help from them.
- Shark Car is UmiCar's best friend. As his name implies, he is a toy car designed to look like a shark.

== Episodes ==
Season	Episodes	Originally aired	
Season	Episodes	First aired	Last aired
1	20	January 25, 2010	December 6, 2010
2	20	October 18, 2010	October 14, 2011
3	20	October 13, 2011	December 6, 2012
4	20	February 4, 2013	April 24, 2015

== Toys and merchandising ==
Fisher-Price released the first official Team Umizoomi toys in early 2012, which were available until 2015. The first products available included plush dolls, bath toys, and figurines featuring characters and vehicles from the show.

=== Preschool math kits ===
The first products released included a series of math kits designed to build preschool math skills. Each of the three kits included an episode of the show on DVD, a storybook, math activity book and math mission cards.

1. Sorting, Classification & Reasoning Pre-K Math Kit (Playground Heroes) (ISBN 1612630871)
2. Shapes, Measurement & Positioning Pre-K Math Kit (Aquarium Fix-It) (ISBN 1612630855)
3. Numbers, Counting & Patterns Pre-K Math Kit (Carnival) (ISBN 1612630863)

=== Books ===
==== Little Golden Books ====
1. Find the Dinosaurs! (ISBN 0307929957)
2. Purple Monkey Rescue! (ISBN 0307975894)

==== Step Into Reading books ====
1. Outer-Space Chase (ISBN 044981890X)
2. Top Cops (ISBN 0385374941)
3. Dog Days (ISBN 044981436X)
4. Super Soap (ISBN 0449813878)
5. Farm Alarm! (ISBN 0385385080)

==== Pictureback books ====
1. UmiCar's Big Race (ISBN 044981386X)
2. Santa's Little Helpers (Glow-in-the-Dark) (ISBN 0449818810)
3. Legend of the Blue Mermaid (ISBN 044981758X)
4. Save the Kitten!/Buster's Big Day (Deluxe Pictureback) (ISBN 0385375204)
5. Happy Love Day! (ISBN 0385375190)
6. Team Power! (3-D!-With-3-D-Glasses!) (ISBN 0449814483)

==== Board books ====
1. Follow that Egg! (ISBN 0385375182)
2. Count with Us! (ISBN 0449818772)
3. First Look and Find (ISBN 1450854265)

==== Coloring and activity books ====
1. Kite Riders! Coloring Book (ISBN 037586119X)
2. Painting Power! Painting Activity Book (ISBN 0375861610)
3. The Big Boat Race! Holographic Sticker Book (ISBN 0375862153)
4. Mighty Adventures Coloring Book with stickers (ISBN 0307930858)
5. Join the Team! Big Coloring Book (ISBN 0307931382)
6. Christmas Countdown Painting Activity Book (ISBN 0449818535)
7. Zoom to the Rescue! Painting Activity Book (ISBN 0307981983)
8. Umi Egg Hunt Activity Book with stickers (ISBN 0307982114)
9. Super Shapes! Activity Book with stencils (ISBN 0307982238)

== DVD releases ==
All releases were distributed by Paramount Home Entertainment.

=== Main releases ===
Name	Release date	Number of episodes	Episode titles
Team Umizoomi	June 28, 2011	4	"The Rolling Toy Parade"; "The Kite Festival"; "The Legend of the Blue Mermaid"; "The Wild West Toy Train Show"
Journey to Numberland	September 6, 2011	3	"The King of Numbers! Never before seen!"; "Picnic"; "The Dinosaur Museum Mishap"
Umi Games	June 2, 2012	4	"Umi Sports Games"; "Boardwalk Games"; "Crazy Skates"; "Carnival"
Animal Heroes	May 14, 2013	4	"Purple Monkey Mission"; "Buster the Lost Dog"; "Cuckoo Bears"; "Animal School House!"
Meet Shark Car!	May 19, 2015	4	"Shark Car"; "Umi Toy Store"; "Stompasaurus"; "Lost and Found Toys"
Umi Space Heroes	June 2, 2015	1	"Umi Space Heroes"

=== Episodes on Nick Jr. compilation DVDs ===
Name	Release date	Number of episodes	Episode titles
Nickelodeon: Merry Christmas!	October 4, 2011	1	"Santa's Little Fixers"
Nickelodeon: Dance to the Music	February 28, 2012	1	"The Butterfly Dance Show"
Nickelodeon: Let's Learn ABCs	January 15, 2013	1	"To the Library"
Nickelodeon: Let's Learn 123s	January 15, 2013	2	"Counting Comet"; "Super Soap!"
Nickelodeon: Rootin' Tootin' Wild West	January 29, 2013 (Walmart); August 6, 2013 (Retail)	1	"Shooting Star"
Nickelodeon: Once Upon a Rhyme	April 30, 2013	1	"The Umi City Treasure Hunt"
Nickelodeon: Let's Learn Colors	July 23, 2013	1	"The Kite Festival"
Bubble Guppies/Team Umizoomi: Into the Snow We Go!	October 15, 2013	2	"A Sledding Snow Day"; "City of Lost Penguins"
Nickelodeon: Let's Learn Patterns and Shapes	August 5, 2014 (Walmart); September 9, 2014 (Retail)	1	"Team Umizoomi vs. the Shape Bandit"
Nickelodeon: Springtime Adventures!	February 26, 2015	1	"Umi Egg Hunt"
Nickelodeon: Let's Learn S.T.E.M.	April 28, 2015	1	"Let's Play Math Dragons"
Nickelodeon: Let's Learn Kindness	July 21, 2015	1	"Stolen Lunches"
Nickelodeon: Celebrate Fall!	August 18, 2015	1	"The Ghost Family Costume Party"
Nickelodeon: Puppy Palooza!	August 25, 2015	1	"Buster the Lost Dog"
Nickelodeon: Let's Learn S.T.E.M. Vol. 2	May 3, 2016	2	"Job Well Done"; "The Great Shape Race"

== Video games ==
Name	Release date	Publisher	Notes
Team Umizoomi	November 1, 2011	2K Play	
Team Umizoomi & Dora's Fantastic Flight	November 6, 2012	2K Play	
Team Umizoomi Learning Game: Umi City Heroes	2014	Leapfrog	

== Broadcast ==
Although Team Umizoomi wrapped up its run in 2015, it continues to air in reruns on the Nick Jr. Channel. The show is currently available on Paramount+.
