= Jane Hanson =

American television presenter

- Born: Minnesota, U.S.
- Education: Marquette University (MA)
- Alma mater: University of Minnesota (BA)
- Occupation: Television presenter
- Years active: 1979- present

Jane Hanson is an American television presenter.

== Early life ==
Born and raised in rural Minnesota, Jane's curiosity to explore the world was ignited by her father who read her newspaper articles and discussed current events.

== Career ==
Hanson began her career at NBC4 as a reporter and news anchor ... she formerly co-hosted New York Live (formerly called LX New York) on NBC-TV in New York. She joined WNBC-TV in September 1979. She hosted Jane's New York on WNBC-TV, a show of her own created to showcase New York City after 9/11. She became host in 2004 after serving as co-anchor of Today in New York from 1988 to 2003.

She has won nine Emmy Awards, for her reporting and anchoring of major news events. In 1988, she became co-anchor of Today in New York, a position she held until 2003 when she became the station's primary anchor for local programming and the host of Jane's New York.

She was also named the Correspondent of the Year by the New York Police Detectives, with a similar honor from the Fire Department of New York.

Hanson has served as a newsreader on The Today Show for John Palmer, Deborah Norville, Faith Daniels, Margaret Larson, Matt Lauer, and Ann Curry from 1988 to 2006. In May 2007, AnswersMedia announced that Hanson was joining HealthAnswersTV as host of the video series The Answered Patient. She returned to WNBC on February 15, 2010, as co-host, with Sara Gore, of its then 5 pm newscast LX New York, as it was then known.

She has taught at Long Island University, Stern College.

== Personal life ==
Hanson is a former president of the New York chapter of the National Academy of Television Arts and Sciences. She lives with her husband and daughter on Long Island.
