= WNBC =

Television station in New York City

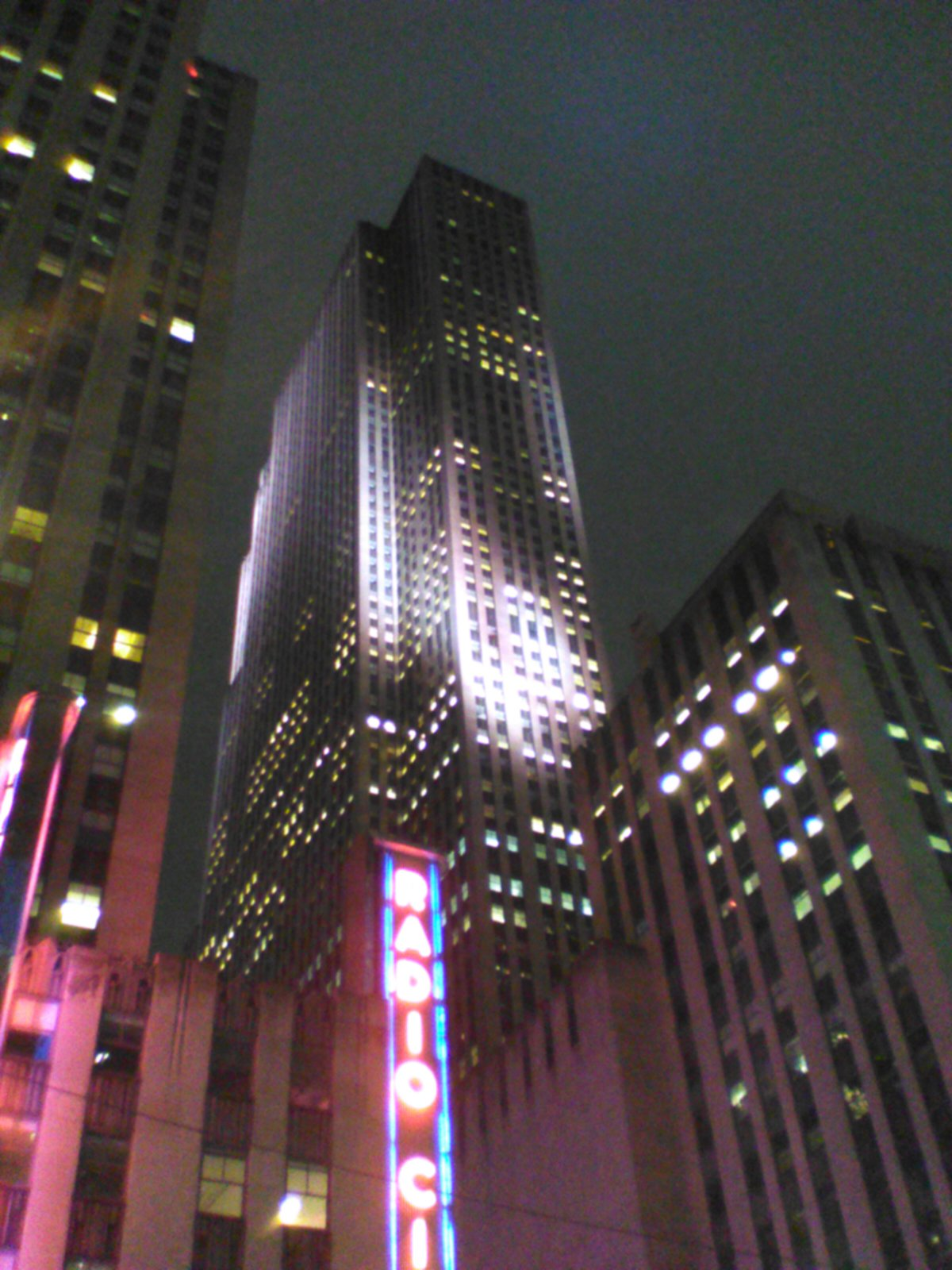
- Headquarters of WNBC at 30 Rockefeller Plaza
- New York, New York; United States
- Channels: Digital: 35 (UHF), shared with WNJU; Virtual: 4
- Branding: NBC 4 New York; News 4 New York

Programming
- Affiliations: 4.1: NBC; for others, see § Technical information and subchannels

Ownership
- Owner: NBC Owned Television Stations; (NBC Telemundo License LLC)
- Sister stations: WNJU

History
- Founded: July 1, 1928 (as experimental station W2XBS)
- First air date: July 1, 1941
- Former call signs: WNBT (1941–1954); WRCA-TV (1954–1960); WNBC-TV (1960–1992)
- Former channel numbers: Analog: 1 (VHF, 1938–1946), 4 (VHF, 1946–2009); Digital: 28 (UHF, 1998–2018), 36 (UHF, 2018–2019); Translator: 57 W57AB
- Call sign meaning: National Broadcasting Company

Technical information
- Licensing authority: FCC
- Facility ID: 47535
- ERP: 575 kW
- HAAT: 496 m (1,627 ft)
- Transmitter coordinates: 40°42′46.8″N 74°0′47.3″W
- Translator(s): WKAQ-TV 2 San Juan, PR

Links
- Public license information: Public file; LMS
- Website: nbcnewyork.com

WNBC (channel 4) is a television station in New York City. It is the flagship station of the NBC television network, owned and operated through its NBC Owned Television Stations division. Under common ownership with Linden, New Jersey–licensed Telemundo outlet WNJU (channel 47), the two stations share studios and offices at 30 Rockefeller Plaza in Midtown Manhattan, co-located with NBC's corporate headquarters, and broadcast from the same transmitter at One World Trade Center; WNJU's facilities in Fort Lee, New Jersey, also serve as WNBC's New Jersey news bureau.

WNBC holds the distinction of being the oldest continuously operating commercial television station in the United States.

== History ==
=== Experimental operations ===
What is now WNBC traces its history to experimental station W2XBS, founded by the Radio Corporation of America (RCA), in 1928, just two years after the National Broadcasting Company (NBC) was founded as the first nationwide radio network. Originally a test bed for the experimental RCA Photophone theater television system, W2XBS used the low-definition mechanical television scanning system. Later it was used mostly for reception and interference tests. The call letters W2XBS meant W2XB-south, with W2XB being the call letters of the first experimental station, started a few months earlier at General Electric's (GE) main factory in Schenectady, New York, which evolved into today's WRGB. GE was the parent company of both RCA and NBC, and technical research was done at the Schenectady plant.

The station originally broadcast on the frequencies of 2.0 to 2.1 MHz. In 1929, W2XBS upgraded its transmitter and broadcast facilities to handle transmissions of 60 vertical lines at 20 frames per second, on the frequencies of 2.75 to 2.85 MHz. In 1928, Felix the Cat was one of the first images ever broadcast by television when RCA chose a papier-mâché (later Bakelite) Felix doll for an experimental broadcast on W2XBS. The doll was chosen for its tonal contrast and its ability to withstand the intense lights needed in early television. It was placed on a rotating phonograph turntable and televised for about two hours each day. The doll remained on the turntable for nearly a decade as RCA fine-tuned the picture's definition, and converted to electronic television.

The station left the air sometime in 1933 as RCA turned its attention to all-electronic cathode-ray tube (CRT) television research at its Camden, New Jersey facility, under the leadership of Dr. Vladimir K. Zworykin.

In 1935, the all-electronic CRT system was authorized as a "field test" project and NBC converted a radio studio in the RCA Building in New York City's Rockefeller Center for television use. In mid-1936, small-scale, irregularly scheduled programming began to air to an audience of some 75 receivers in the homes of high-level RCA staff, and a dozen or so sets in a closed circuit viewing room in 52nd-floor offices of the RCA Building. The viewing room often hosted visiting organizations or corporate guests, who saw a live program produced in the studios many floors below.

Viewership of early NBC broadcasts was tightly restricted to those authorized by the company, whose installed set base eventually reached about 200. Technical standards for television broadcasting were in flux as well. Between the time experimental, electronic transmissions began in 1935 and the beginning of commercial television service in 1941, picture definition increased from 343 to 441 lines, and finally (in 1941) to the 525-line standard used for analog television from the start of full commercial service until the end of analog broadcasts in mid-2009. The sound signal was also changed from AM to FM, and the spacing of sound and vision carriers was also changed several times. Shortly after NBC began a semi-regular television transmission schedule in 1938, DuMont Laboratories announced TV sets for sale to the public, a move that RCA was saving for the opening of the World's Fair on April 30, 1939, the day that regularly scheduled television programming was to begin in New York on NBC with much fanfare. In response, NBC ceased all TV broadcasting for several weeks until RCA sets went on sale; regular NBC telecasts commenced the day the fair opened.

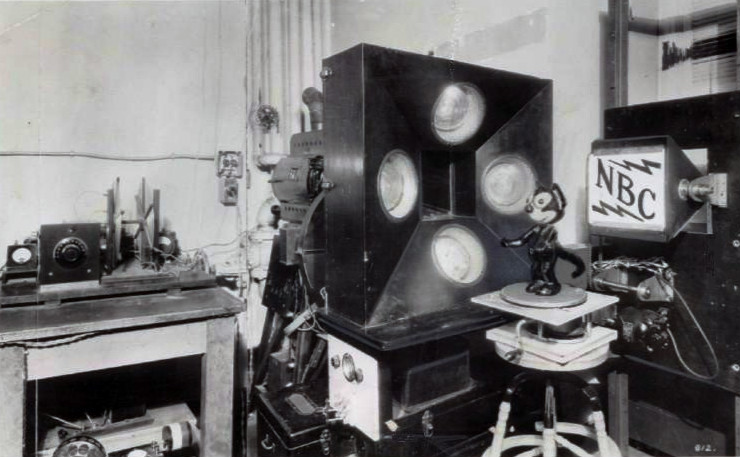
The Felix the Cat doll used by NBC in early television experiments.

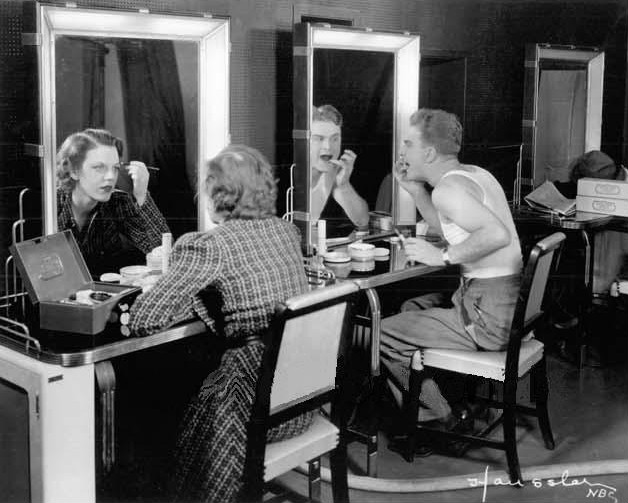
Eddie Albert and Grace Brandt apply makeup for the first television broadcast of a play (November 1936).

==== Firsts for W2XBS ====
As W2XBS broadcasting on "Channel 1" (44–50 MHz), the station scored numerous "firsts". These included: the first televised Broadway drama (June 1938); the first live news event covered by a mobile unit (a fire in an abandoned building in November 1938); the first live telecast of a presidential speech (Franklin D. Roosevelt opening the 1939 New York World's Fair); the first live telecasts of college and Major League Baseball (both in 1939), the first telecast of a National Football League game (also in 1939); the first telecast of a National Hockey League game (early 1940); the first broadcast of religious services (Easter Sunday 1940); the first network (multi-city) telecast of a political convention (the 1940 Republican National Convention, held June 24–28 in the Philadelphia Civic Center) seen also on W3XE in Philadelphia (now KYW-TV) and W2XB in Schenectady (now WRGB); and the broadcast of the feature film The Crooked Circle on June 18, 1940.

In August 1940, W2XBS transmissions were temporarily put on hold, as "Channel 1" was reassigned by the FCC to 50–56 MHz; technical adjustments needed to be made for the conversion. The station returned to the air in October, just in time to broadcast Franklin D. Roosevelt's second and final appearance on live television, when his speech at Madison Square Garden on October 28, 1940, was telecast over W2XBS.

=== First commercial television station ===
On June 24, 1941, W2XBS received a commercial license under the calls WNBT (for "NBC Television"), thus becoming one of the first two fully licensed commercial television stations in the United States, alongside CBS's WCBW on channel 2 (now WCBS-TV), which had evolved from experimental W2XAB. NBC and CBS were instructed to sign on simultaneously on July 1 so that neither of the major broadcast companies could claim exclusively to be "first". However, WNBT signed on at 1:30 pm, one full hour before WCBW. As a result, WNBC (and essentially, NBC) inadvertently holds the distinction as the oldest continuously operating commercial television station (and television network, respectively) in the United States, and also the only one ready to accept sponsors from its beginning. The first program broadcast at 1 p.m. EST by the sign-on/opening ceremony with the U.S. national anthem "The Star-Spangled Banner", followed by an announcement of that day's programs and the commencement of NBC television programming.

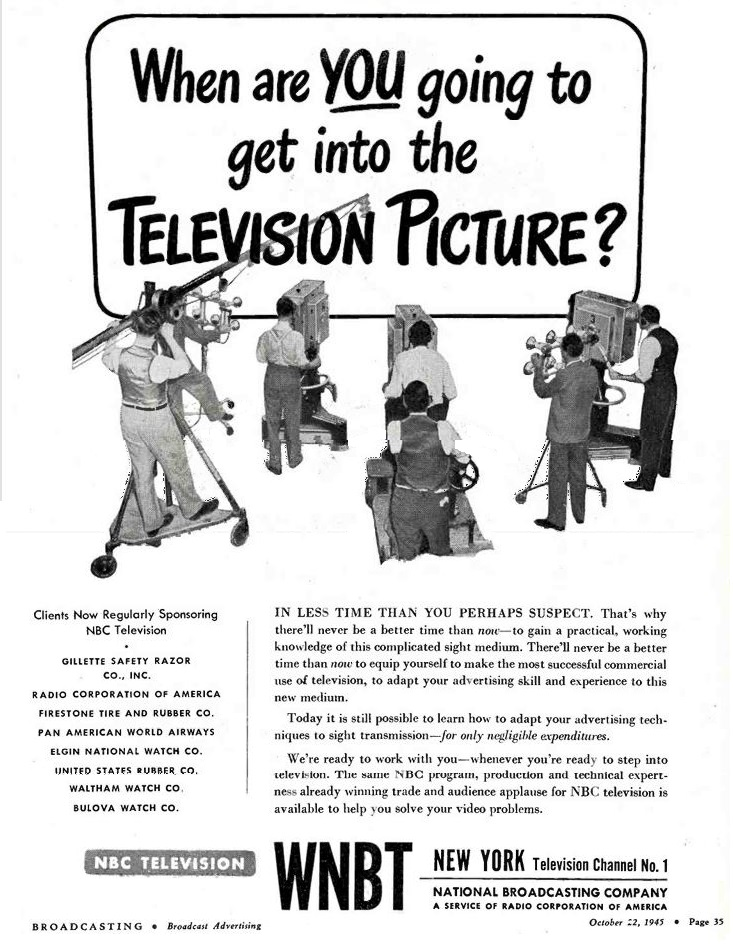
October 1945 advertisement for WNBT, then on "Television Channel No. 1".

WNBT originally broadcast on channel 1. On its first day on the air, WNBT broadcast the world's first official television advertisement before a baseball game between the Brooklyn Dodgers and Philadelphia Phillies. The announcement for Bulova watches, for which the company paid anywhere from $4.00 to $9.00 (reports vary), displayed a WNBT test pattern modified to look like a clock with the hands showing the time. The Bulova logo, with the phrase "Bulova Watch Time", was shown in the lower right-hand quadrant of the test pattern while the second hand swept around the dial for one minute. Bulova-sponsored time signals would still appear on the station on a daily basis as late as 1949.

Although full commercial telecasting began on July 1, 1941, with the first paid advertisements on WNBT, there had been experimental, non-paid advertising on television as far back as 1930. NBC's earliest non-paid, television commercials may have been those seen during the first Major League Baseball game ever telecast, a game between the Dodgers and the Cincinnati Reds, on August 26, 1939, over W2XBS. To secure the rights to show the game on television, NBC allowed each of the Dodgers' regular radio sponsors at the time to have one commercial during the telecast; these were done by Dodger announcer Red Barber. For Ivory Soap, he held up a bar of the product, for Mobil gas he put on a filling station attendant's cap while giving his spiel, and for Wheaties he poured a bowl of the cereal, added milk and bananas, and took a big spoonful.

The pioneering special interest/documentary show The Voice of Firestone Televues, a television offshoot of The Voice of Firestone, a mainstay on NBC radio since 1928, became the first regularly scheduled TV program not featuring news or sports when it began on WNBT on November 29, 1943. (Though a one-time-only, trial episode of Truth or Consequences aired on WNBT's first week of programming two years earlier; it eventually returned to TV in the 1950s.)

During World War II, RCA diverted key technical TV staff to the U.S. Navy, which was interested in developing a television-guided bomb. WNBT's studio and program staff were placed at the disposal of the New York City Police Department and used for civil defense training telecasts, with only a limited number of weekly programs for general audiences airing during much of the war. Programming began to grow on a small scale during 1944. On April 10, 1944, WNBT began feeding The Voice of Firestone Televues each week to a small network of stations including General Electric's Schenectady station (now called WRGB) and Philco-owned WPTZ (now KYW-TV) in Philadelphia, both of which are now affiliated with CBS (in KYW-TV's case, they are owned by CBS). This series is considered to be the NBC Television Network's first regularly scheduled program.

On May 8, 1945, WNBT broadcast hours of news coverage on the end of World War II in Europe, and remotes from around New York City. This event was pre-promoted by NBC with a direct-mail card sent to television set owners in the New York City area. At one point, a WNBT camera placed atop the marquee of the Astor Hotel in New York City panned the crowd below celebrating the end of the war in Europe. The vivid coverage was a prelude to television's rapid growth after the war ended. In the spring of 1946, the station changed its frequency from VHF channel 1 to channel 4 after channel 1 was removed from use for television broadcasting. From 1946 to 2009, it occupied the 66–72 MHz band of frequencies which had been designated as "channel 3" in the pre-1946 FCC allocation table. It was renumbered Channel 4 in the post-war system (DuMont-owned WABD, now WNYW—had been designated as "Channel 4", before that station moved to the current channel 5 but was only required to retune its video and audio carriers downward by 2 MHz under the new system). In October 1948, WNBT's operations were integrated with those of sister stations WNBC radio (660 AM) and WNBC-FM (97.1).

The station changed its call letters on October 18, 1954, to WRCA-TV (for NBC's then-parent company, Radio Corporation of America or RCA) and on May 22, 1960, channel 4 became WNBC-TV. NBC had previously used the callsign on its television station in New Britain, Connecticut, from 1957 until it was sold earlier in 1960 (that station is now WVIT, and is once again an NBC-owned station). WNBC-TV also earned a place in broadcasting history as the birthplace of The Tonight Show. It began on the station in 1953 as a local late night program, The Knickerbocker Beer Show starring Steve Allen and NBC executive Sylvester "Pat" Weaver brought it to the network in 1954. Studio 6B, the show's home under Jack Paar, Johnny Carson and today Jimmy Fallon, was the news studio for WNBC while Tonight was produced in Los Angeles.

On June 1, 1992, channel 4 dropped the "-TV" suffix from its call letters (following the sale in 1988 of its sister radio station WNBC, which is now WFAN) and became simply WNBC. It also changed its logo and rebranded to "4 New York". The accompanying station image campaign was titled "We're 4 New York" and featured a musical theme composed by Edd Kalehoff. WNBC was rebranded again as "NBC 4" on September 5, 1995, with its newscasts being renamed NewsChannel 4. The "4 New York" branding was revived part time in July 2007, and full time in March 2008.

During the terrorist attacks of September 11, 2001, the transmitter facilities of WNBC, as well as eight other New York City area television stations and several radio stations, were destroyed when two hijacked airplanes crashed into and destroyed the World Trade Center. WNBC broadcast engineer Bill Steckman died in the attack, along with Don DiFranco of WABC-TV; Gerard Copolla of WNET; Steve Jacobson of WPIX; and Bob Pattison and Isaias Rivera of WCBS-TV. In the immediate aftermath, the station temporarily fed its signal to three UHF stations that were still broadcasting (PBS member station WLIW and independent stations WMBC-TV and W26CE). After resuming over-the-air transmissions, the station broadcast from the former transmitter site of Channel 68 in West Orange, New Jersey. Since 2005, WNBC has broadcast its signal from the Empire State Building in midtown Manhattan, returning to the original transmitter site used from the 1930s to the 1970s. On May 9, 2017, it was announced that WNBC would return broadcasting from lower Manhattan at One World Trade Center by the end of the year.

In 2004, WNBC served as the model station for NBC Weather Plus, a 24-hour digital weather channel that aired on its second digital subchannel (4.2) and several local cable systems; other NBC-owned stations launched their own Weather Plus channels in 2005, although Weather Plus was discontinued at the end of 2008.

WNBC ended regular programming on its analog signal, over VHF channel 4, at 12:30 p.m. on June 12, 2009, as part of the federally mandated transition from analog to digital television. The station's digital signal remained on its transition period UHF channel 28, using virtual channel 4.

As part of the SAFER Act, WNBC kept its analog signal on the air until June 26 to inform viewers of the digital television transition. During this time, the station would participate in the "Analog Nightlight" program for two weeks, with a looped video in English and Spanish explaining how to switch to digital reception.

In February 2015, WNBC and the other NBC-owned stations offered live, web-based streaming of programming to subscribers of participating cable and satellite television providers, as provided through the TV Everywhere mobile apps.

On March 15, 2016, NBCUniversal pulled the signals of WNBC and WNJU along with sister cable channel Bravo and then-co-owned USA Network, Syfy, MSNBC and CNBC from Dish Network's lineup in the New York metropolitan area as a result of a dispute between NBC and Dish; despite that, Dish claimed NBCUniversal had demanded that it renew its carriage of ten NBC-owned stations and sixteen Telemundo-owned stations, including those removed due to the dispute. Three days later, Dish announced it would continue to carry WNBC, WNJU and five other cable channels for another ten days while the FCC sought arbitration.

On April 13, 2017, it was revealed that WNBC's over-the-air spectrum had been sold in the FCC's spectrum reallocation auction, fetching $214 million. As a result, WNBC's signal was co-located with that of sister station WNJU, which re-located its transmitter to One World Trade Center in 2017. NBC had won similar spectrum bids using Telemundo stations in Chicago and Philadelphia (which entered into in similar arrangements with NBC O&Os WMAQ-TV and WCAU), but stated that in this case, the Telemundo station had a superior signal. WNBC ceased broadcasting on UHF digital channel 28 from the Empire State Building on April 2, 2018, in favor of the shared broadcast with WNJU on channel 36 from One World Trade Center. WNBC along with WNJU later moved channels again on August 1, 2019, at 1 p.m. (EDT) to digital channel 35.

== Programming ==
WNBC has long presented events such as the annual St. Patrick's Day Parade, the National Puerto Rican Day Parade (until 2006, when coverage moved to WNYW and currently WABC-TV), the Columbus Day Parade (until 2010, when coverage moved to WABC-TV), the Macy's Thanksgiving Day Parade, and the Rockefeller Center Christmas Tree Lighting. The Tree Lighting aired exclusively in New York on WNBC until 1997, when NBC began airing it nationally. WNBC has sponsored an annual two-day Health & Fitness Expo Fair at MetLife Stadium every summer. The station has sponsored a Food Drive together with local retailer Stop & Shop named "Feeding Our Families" which has been held on the second Saturday in April since 2017. Beginning in 1995, they were the exclusive local English-language carrier of the annual New York City Marathon until 2013 when WABC-TV took over. From 2010 to 2014, the station was an official local broadcast partner of Discovery Times Square. From 2012 to 2014, the station along with the New York Daily News had partnerships with Mount Sinai Health System, Live Well New York and Popular Community Bank (Popular Tips). The station, along with Maury Povich and Fox owned-and-operated WNYW, co-funded the 1998 PBS documentary NY TV: By the People Who Made It produced by WNET. During the Christmas season, the station has an annual Holiday Sing-Along. The station also produces Visiones, a weekly segment about Hispanic culture, that also airs in Spanish on sister Telemundo station WNJU, and Positively Black, a weekly segment about African-American culture.

As of March 2025, WNBC is one of nine NBC-owned stations that distributes programming either nationally and/or regionally (along with KNTV, KNBC, KNSD, WCAU, WVIT, WTVJ, WMAQ-TV and KXAS-TV).

=== Sports programming ===
Through NBC's coverage of the National Football League, WNBC has televised two Super Bowl championships won by New York teams: the Jets' upset victory over the Baltimore Colts in Super Bowl III, and the Giants' win over the New England Patriots in Super Bowl XLVI. WNBC is the New York area station for NBC's national broadcasts of Sunday Night Football featuring either one of the two teams. The station also served as the default home station of the Jets from 1965 (when NBC became the broadcaster for the American Football League of which the Jets were then a part) until 1997, when WCBS-TV became the new broadcast rightsholder (through CBS) of what was by now the American Football Conference; it also aired occasional New York Giants games from 1970 (with the completion of the AFL/NFL merger) to 1997; these were limited to home interconference contests.

WNBC (as W2XBS) became the first station to broadcast Major League Baseball games in 1939 with the pioneer broadcast being that of an August 26 doubleheader at Ebbets Field between the Brooklyn Dodgers and the Cincinnati Reds. The station has aired numerous New York Mets (since 1962) and New York Yankees games (and before 1957, games of the Dodgers and Giants) as part of MLB's broadcast contract with NBC from 1947 to 1989, The Baseball Network in 1995, and playoff-only coverage from 1996 to 2000. The station has aired 18 of the Yankees' World Series appearances (12 of which the team won), and three Mets World Series appearances (two of which the Mets won). Since 2026, the station airs any Mets or Yankees games as part of NBC's national MLB coverage; this is in addition to games on WNYW and WPIX.

As the network's flagship station, per its NHL on NBC obligations (which ended in 2021), it broadcast several Stanley Cup playoff games all the way to the Cup Finals, in addition to the NHL Game of the Week (if the Rangers, Islanders or New Jersey Devils were playing). It would be only in 2012 when it aired the Stanley Cup Final as part of the network-wide coverage when the Devils lost out to the Los Angeles Kings. Also, the station aired the 2014 Cup Finals, where the Rangers also lost to the Kings.

From 1990 to 2002, the station aired New York Knicks and New Jersey Nets games through the NBA on NBC; this included the Knicks' appearances in the 1994 and 1999 NBA Finals, as well as the Nets' appearance in the 2002 NBA Finals. These resumed in 2025, with WNBC airing Tuesday and Sunday night games as part of its NBA obligations with the wider NBC network whenever the Knicks and Nets are featured.

=== News operation ===
From the late 1960s through the 1980s, WNBC was involved in a fierce three-way battle with WCBS-TV and WABC-TV for the top spot in the New York television ratings. This continued during a lean period for NBC as a whole. WNBC's hallmark over the years has been strong coverage of breaking stories, the combination of straight news items and those with light-hearted and/or entertainment elements (as could be seen in such programs as Live at Five and Today in New York), and the generally low turnover of their on-air talent. Many of WNBC's personalities have been at the station for over 20 years. For instance, Chuck Scarborough has served as the station's lead anchor since the debut of NewsCenter 4 on April 29, 1974. Scarborough represents one half of the longest-serving anchor duo in New York television history, the other half being Sue Simmons, who anchored the 11 p.m. report with Scarborough from 1980 to 2012. Len Berman served as lead sports anchor for 27 years, from 1982 to 2009. Senior correspondent Gabe Pressman was at the station from 1956 until his death in 2017, save for a seven-year stint (from 1972 to 1979) at WNEW-TV (now WNYW).

WNBC-TV was the first station on the East Coast to air a two-hour nightly newscast, and the first major-market station in the country to find success in airing a 5 p.m. report, when NewsCenter 4 (a format created for WNBC by pioneering news executive Lee Hanna) was introduced in 1974, a time when channel 4 ran a distant third in the city's local news ratings. The NewsCenter format debuted with a futuristic set described by Hanna as being "the most modern, electronically complicated and sophisticated" facility in the country at that time. A direct, unique style of presenting the news was also implemented, incorporating hard news reports with separate segments devoted to consumer reports, features, and a dedicated weather desk. Hanna declared at the outset, "there will be no happy talk [...] we're not in business to be comedians", a veiled reference to the style of WABC's highly-successful Eyewitness News format. The NewsCenter format became a major success in New York, and NBC subsequently brought it to their owned-and-operated stations in Chicago, Washington, D.C., and Los Angeles.

The NewsCenter4 title was kept by WNBC until September 1, 1980, when the newscasts were renamed News 4 New York. Shortly before then the 5 p.m. program was renamed Live at Five, and the hour was reformatted from a straight news program to a mix of hard news and celebrity interviews, a style that would become known as infotainment. Live at Five eventually became the most-successful local program in New York City, a feat that resulted in landing the show's hosts on the cover of New York magazine. For most of the time during the News 4 New York era of the 1980s and early 1990s, WNBC-TV used various music cues created by Scott Schreer. His theme for News 4 New York was based on a synthesized version of the NBC chimes, with a graphics package featuring a lightning bolt striking its logo from 1980 to 1990, a fancy die-cut "4".

In 1992, the station began calling itself 4 New York and the campaign song, written by Edd Kalehoff, was quickly adopted as the theme for the newscast. The theme was briefly brought back after the September 11 attacks in 2001. In 1995, after the station rebranded itself as "NBC 4" and its newscasts as NewsChannel 4, Kalehoff wrote a new theme called "NBC Stations" featuring the aforementioned NBC chimes. It remained in use for eight years, along with a graphics package using a simple red line for the lower thirds.

The 2003 graphics package was created by Emmy Award-winner Randy Pyburn of Pyburn Films. Pyburn has produced several promotions for the station and the now-defunct Jane's New York specials hosted by former WNBC reporter Jane Hanson. The graphics package was also used on other NBC stations. The music was written by Rampage Music and featured a brassy version of the NBC chimes, and lower thirds featured a shimmering peacock. In March 2008, concurrent with the restoration of the 4 New York branding, the newscasts began to be called News 4 New York once more.

Many WNBC personalities have appeared, and have also moved up to the NBC network, including: Marv Albert, Len Berman, Contessa Brewer, Chris Cimino, Fran Charles, Darlene Rodriguez, Maurice DuBois, Michael Gargiulo, Tony Guida, Jim Hartz, Janice Huff, Matt Lauer, Tom Llamas, Dave Price, Al Roker, Scarborough, and Tom Snyder. In the past, Albert, Berman, Brewer, Charles, Cimino, DuBois, Guida, Hartz, Lauer, Llamas, Roker, Scarborough, and Snyder have worked at WNBC and NBC at the same time. Price, Rodriguez, Huff, and Gargiulo currently work for both. One monthly feature was Berman's Spanning the World, a reel of odd and interesting sports highlights from the past month, including a recorded introduction and closing by NBC staff announcer Don Pardo. The segment aired monthly on Today.

When Simmons joined the station in early 1980, she was paired with Scarborough on both the 6 p.m. and 11 p.m. newscasts. However, for most of the time until 2005, WNBC's weeknight anchor rotation had Simmons and another male anchor (including Jack Cafferty, Guida, Lauer, and briefly Scarborough) at 5 pm; Scarborough and various anchors (John Hambrick, Pat Harper, and Michele Marsh among them) at 6 pm; and Scarborough and Simmons together at 11 pm. That changed in 2005 as Live at Five anchor Jim Rosenfield jumped back to WCBS-TV, where he had once been the noon and 5 p.m. anchor and took on the role as lead anchor for their 5 p.m. and 11 p.m. newscasts.

Former reporter Perri Peltz returned to WNBC to co-anchor Live at Five with Simmons, making New York City one of the few large markets with two female anchors on an evening newscast. The move harkened back to three decades earlier, when the station paired Pia Lindström with Melba Tolliver on its 5 p.m. news hour, creating one of the first all-female anchor teams on a major-market American television station. It was short-lived as Simmons and Peltz were both displaced from Live at Five because of changes in the station's early evening news lineup that went into effect on March 12, 2007: David Ushery and Lynda Baquero became co-anchors of a truncated, 30-minute-long Live at Five broadcast, followed by Peltz with a 30-minute, soft-news program, News 4 You. Simmons was moved to co-anchor at 6 p.m. with Scarborough. On September 13, 2006, WNBC became the first New York City television station to broadcast its newscasts in high definition. On May 5, 2007, WNBC brought back its popular campaign song "We're 4 New York", composed by Kalehoff, after nearly six years off air (after the September 11, 2001, attacks).

In early autumn 2007, additional changes were brought to WNBC's early-evening lineup. On September 10, the station moved the newsmagazine series Extra to 5 pm, and cancelled Live at Five. News 4 You remained at 5:30 pm, but was replaced on October 15, 2007, with a traditional newscast, anchored by Simmons and Michael Gargiulo. The 6 p.m. newscast became anchored by Ushery and Baquero, and New York Nightly News, a new half-hour newscast with Scarborough as sole anchor, debuted at 7 p.m.

These changes did not lead to an increase in WNBC's ratings in the November 2007 sweeps period, partially because of the 2007–08 Writers Guild of America strike. The most shocking of WNBC's ratings decreases was its 11 p.m. newscast, which fell to third place, behind WCBS and WABC. WNBC altered its 5–6 p.m. hour on January 2, 2008, swapping the half-hour news at 5:30 p.m. with Extra. On March 9, 2009, with the launch of New York Nonstop on digital subchannel 4.2, New York Nightly News was moved to the subchannel and expanded to one hour, while Extra was moved back to 7 p.m. and a full hour of news returned to the 5 p.m. hour. Still, WNBC's ratings struggled: during the March 2009 sweeps period, its newscasts were a distant third in all-time slots, except during the weekday mornings, where it remained in second.

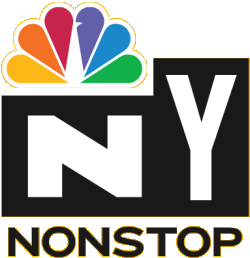
Former New York Nonstop logo from 2009 to 2011.

On May 7, 2008, NBC Universal announced plans for a major restructuring of WNBC's news department. The centerpiece of the restructuring was the creation of a 24-hour all-news channel on WNBC's second digital subchannel (4.2). Channel 4's news operations were revamped and melded into the all-news channel, which serves as a "content center" for the station's various local distribution platforms. The digital news channel was launched on March 9, 2009. In the fall of 2008, WNBC started beta-testing a new website which was apparently poised to be one of the major platforms for the content center. On November 17, 2008, WNBC moved its news studio from Studio 6B to 7E and rolled out a new set design, graphics package, and theme song written by veteran TV composer Frank Gari. This move came after months of planning the new content newsroom with its 24-hour news digital subchannel. It was also their debut of the updated 4 New York logo, using letters in Media Gothic Bold font and the "New York" wording was switched from its script font to All caps font, which is designed by Brit Redden of Modal Pictures.

On June 16, 2009, WNBC announced that its 5 p.m. newscast would be replaced in September by a one-hour daily lifestyle and entertainment show by LXTV entitled LX New York. After this change, WNBC, with only three hours per day of local news, had the shortest airtime devoted to local news of any "big three" network-owned station. In the fall of 2009, WNBC began sharing its news helicopter with Fox owned-and-operated WNYW (channel 5) as part of a Local News Service agreement. The SkyFox HD helicopter operated by WNYW when used by WNBC was called "Chopper 4" on-air. This agreement ended in 2012, with WNBC returning to use its own helicopter when the contract expired. In the summer of 2010, The Debrief with David Ushery began to air on Sunday at noon on WNBC after launching on New York Nonstop; it now airs Sunday mornings at 5:30 a.m.

LX New York was renamed to New York Live on May 26, 2011. The program was set to move to 3 p.m. on September 12, 2011; at that time, WNBC would resume airing a 5 p.m. newscast. However, due to Hurricane Irene, the 5 p.m. newscast's start date was moved up to August 29, 2011, with New York Live moving to its new 3 p.m. slot then. On November 18, 2011, WNBC launched a noon newscast that replaced The Rundown with Russell and Llamas as the anchors.

In December 2011, WNBC struck a news partnership with non-profit news-reporting organization ProPublica. The organization, which won a Pulitzer Prize in 2010, already has partnerships with several media outlets including USA Today, Reader's Digest, HuffPost and Businessweek. However, ProPublica's reports are incorporated across all NBC O&O stations, not just WNBC. This is part of larger efforts for NBCUniversal's television stations to partner with nonprofit news organizations following its acquisition by Comcast.

WNBC relocated from Studio 7E to Studio 3C (the studio previously used by NBC Nightly News, which now originates from Studio 3B) on April 21, 2012. Channel 4 also updated its graphics and switched to the "L.A. Groove" theme that has been in use by sister station KNBC. On June 15, 2012, Sue Simmons left WNBC as her contract with the station was not renewed. In January 2013, the station expanded its Sunday 11 p.m. newscasts to one hour, possibly to compete with WABC which expanded its late news in January 2012.

On June 6, 2016, WNBC revamped its website. On June 11, 2016, beginning with the 11 p.m. newscast, its news graphics were also changed and it began using Look N graphics from NBC Artworks, becoming the first NBC-owned station to use the new graphics that were rolled out to other NBC-owned stations around this time. On June 13 of the same year, the station debuted its 4 p.m. newscast, thus becoming the second New York television station to expand its newscasts to that time period after WABC-TV (which had their 4 p.m. newscasts since May 2011).

On October 10, 2016, WNBC relocated from studio 3C to studio 3K (the studio also used by Dateline NBC and sister cable network MSNBC), which bears similarities to the previous set in 3C, albeit a lot larger in size and with several changes (i.e. a new weather center area, a touchscreen display similar to Today's Orange Room, an LED wall, and a work space and presentation pod). In fall 2016, WNBC entered a content-sharing agreement with WOR to include news and weather content supplied by the station; WNBC's weather content is also heard on other iHeartMedia radio stations throughout the New York metropolitan area. On December 21, 2016, WNBC announced that it would be launching a new S band weather radar system, called Storm Tracker 4, which is planned to launch in winter 2017. On December 27, 2016, the station announced it would move the midday newscast to 11 a.m. (the first and only 11 a.m. midday newscast in the New York media market), and its locally produced lifestyle/entertainment program New York Live to 11:30 a.m. beginning January 16, 2017. As part of the changes of the daytime lineup at the station, it would move Days of Our Lives from the network's default Eastern Time Zone slot of 1 p.m. to the early time slot of 12 pm, followed by Access Hollywood Live at 1 pm.

On June 30, 2017, it was announced that Chuck Scarborough would step down as the anchor of the 11 p.m. newscast on July 14 but would continue to anchor the 6 p.m. newscast. 4 p.m. anchor Stefan Holt, whose father Lester presides over NBC Nightly News down the hall from Studio 3K, assumed duties for the late newscast beginning July 17.

On July 31, 2017, the station expanded its morning newscast Today in New York by a half an hour, beginning at 4 a.m. for a total of three hours; this is the first 4 a.m. newscast in the New York media market since WPIX had one from 2010 to 2014. Six days later on August 6, 2017, the Sunday edition of the morning newscast had an extra half-hour added after 9:30 am; the 6–8 a.m. portion remained unchanged. As part of the changes to the station's Sunday morning lineup, Sunday Today with Willie Geist was moved to the network's recommended time of 8 a.m. followed by the LXTV-produced program Open House NYC at 9 a.m. Meet the Press remained at 10:30 am.

In November 2017, WNBC opened the San Juan news bureau led by bilingual reporter Julio "Gaby" Acevedo; the bureau delivers daily English and Spanish-language news and updates for the station and its sister station WNJU as well as all NBC and Telemundo-owned stations across the country; the new bureau operated through February 2018.

On August 19, 2020, it was announced that after four years with the station, Stefan Holt would be leaving to rejoin Chicago sister station WMAQ-TV to anchor its 4 p.m. and 10 p.m. newscasts, beginning in October. On August 31, 2020, the station announced that 11 a.m. and 5 p.m. news anchor David Ushery would succeed Holt on the 4 p.m. and 11 p.m. newscasts, beginning October 12, 2020; however, due to Holt's early departure on September 25, the official start date was moved up to September 28. Meanwhile, weekend anchor Adam Kuperstein succeeded Ushery in the 11 a.m. and 5 p.m. newscasts.

On June 7, 2021, WNBC started airing a new half-hour weekday 7 p.m. newscast.

In January 2022, WNBC announced plans to launch a new FAST channel called "NBC New York News"; this announcement follows the simultaneous rollout of streaming news channels from its sister stations in Chicago, Miami, Philadelphia and Boston on January 20. The channel was launched on March 17, 2022. In 2024, WNBC launched an exclusive 7 a.m. newscast on the channel.

In the summer of 2022, WNBC indicated it would return to Studio 3B, which will be split with WNJU once that station relocates operations to Rockefeller Center.

==== Notable current on-air staff ====
Anchors

- Pat Battle (also reporter)
- Michael Gargiulo
- Darlene Rodriguez
- David Ushery

Weather

- Janice Huff (Member, AMS) – chief meteorologist
- Maria LaRosa (Member, AMS) – meteorologist
- Raphael Miranda (AMS Seal of Approval) – meteorologist
- Dave Price

Sports team

- Bruce Beck – sports director; also host of Sports Final with Bruce Beck

Reporters

- Lynda Baquero – consumer affairs and general assignment reporter
- Jacque Reid – co-host of New York Live
- Melissa Russo – political reporter
- Lauren Scala – correspondent for New York Live (formerly served as traffic reporter)
- Ida Siegal – general assignment reporter

==== Notable alumni ====
- Asa Aarons
- Cindy Adams
- Marv Albert
- Tex Antoine
- Len Berman
- Lynn Berry
- Francesco Bilotto
- Contessa Brewer
- Bill Boggs
- Mel Brandt
- Dr. Joyce Brothers
- Jack Cafferty
- Ti-Hua Chang
- Fran Charles
- Linda Church
- Chris Cimino
- Katherine Creag
- Maurice DuBois
- Fred Facey
- Frank Field
- Ira Joe Fisher
- Art Fleming
- Betty Furness
- Arthur Gary
- Andrew Glassman
- Marty Glickman
- Cat Greenleaf
- Erica Grow
- Max Gomez
- Carlos Granda
- Roger Grimsby
- Tony Guida
- Carolyn Gusoff
- John Hambrick
- Steve Handelsman
- Jane Hanson
- Pat Harper
- Reggie Harris
- Jim Hartz
- Stefan Holt
- Wayne Howell
- Don Imus
- John Johnson
- Matt Lauer
- Tom Llamas
- Rick Leventhal
- Pia Lindström
- Otis Livingston
- Lynda Lopez
- Felipe Luciano
- Jeffrey Lyons
- Dave Marash
- Sal Marchiano
- Michele Marsh
- Frank McGee
- John Miller
- Tim Minton
- DeMarco Morgan
- Rob Morrison
- Bruce Morrow
- John Muller
- George Page
- Don Pardo
- Ralph Penza
- Perri Peltz
- Walter Perez
- Deb Placey
- Gabe Pressman
- Shimon Prokupecz
- Audrey Puente
- Howard Reig
- Carol Anne Riddell
- Bobby Rivers
- Vic Roby
- Gloria Rojas
- Al Roker
- Jim Rosenfield
- Jeff Rossen
- Kyle Rote
- Bill Ryan
- Jim Ryan
- Tim Ryan
- Chuck Scarborough (1974–2024)
- Dick Schaap
- Rob Schmitt
- Mike Schneider
- Adam Shapiro
- Sue Simmons (1980–2012)
- Dr. Ian Smith
- Liz Smith
- Tom Snyder
- Scott Stanford
- Howard Stern
- Carl Stokes
- Mike Taibbi
- Felicia Taylor
- Bob Teague
- Melba Tolliver
- Katy Tur
- Sibila Vargas
- Jonathan Vigliotti
- Glen Walker
- Chris Wallace
- Jim Watkins
- Rolonda Watts
- Mary Alice Williams
- Joe Witte
- Bill Wolff
- Lew Wood

== Controversies and incidents ==
=== Chopper 4 helicopter crashes ===
In 1998, WNBC introduced and heavily promoted Chopper 4, a Eurocopter EC135 helicopter. The new chopper ended up crashing into the Passaic River near Harrison and Newark, New Jersey on December 3, 1998; reporter Kai Simonsen and pilot Terry Hawes survived.

An older news helicopter, a Eurocopter AS350, was returned to service and remained until May 4, 2004, when it crashed while covering a shooting in Brooklyn. Reporter Andrew Torres, pilot Russ Cowry and pilot trainee Hassan Taan survived the crash and were taken to area hospitals. The crash occurred at about 6:30 p.m. as the crew was preparing for a live report from the scene of a shooting in East Flatbush. Before the cut-in, Chopper 4 appeared to begin a steep nosedive. WABC's own helicopter captured the initial nosedive and the chopper's subsequent tailspin until crashing into a rooftop.

=== 2008 weeknight infomercial issue ===
On March 25, 2008, WNBC carried a paid program leading into NBC's Tuesday night prime time and after the 7 p.m. newscast for mortgage lender Lend America, replacing that night's Access Hollywood. Several 'Big Four' stations throughout the United States had carried paid programs leading into prime time in a period during the Great Recession to some varied controversy (and often do to this day during Saturday evenings, a little-trafficked time period with no complaint), but the one airing in New York of the Lend America infomercial, which was hosted by ex-WNBC reporter Joe Avellar, attracted massive criticism from viewers and local media critics, especially involving Avellar's role as host and Lend America's part in the housing crisis, and to a much lesser extent, preemption of regular weeknight programming. Earning the station $130,000 for the 28 1/2-minute program, it generated low ratings and led to a quick fallout, with general manager Frank Comerford resigning his position from the station for approving the airtime sale. Although Lend America expressed interest in buying more early access time on the station, WNBC has never again carried a paid program before prime time on weeknights.

=== Sue Simmons "F-bomb" incident ===
On May 12, 2008, a prime time promo for that night's 11 p.m. newscast was thought by anchor Sue Simmons to be on tape for later broadcast but was actually going out live. After completing the first portion of the tease, Simmons noticed co-anchor Chuck Scarborough distracted with something on his on-desk laptop, and thinking the take would be trashed and another take would be shot for air, shouted "The fuck are you doing?" towards him in a manner seemingly meant as an inside joke among colleagues, while YouTube b-roll of a cruise ship departing Manhattan continued to roll before the promo's end.

Later during the actual newscast, Simmons profusely apologized for the live outburst, saying, "I have to acknowledge an unfortunate incident. I used a word that many people find offensive. It was a mistake I made and I'm truly sorry." No further comment was made by the station or Simmons about the incident.

Late Show with David Letterman used clips from the promo in several sketches mocking the incident.

=== I-Team Super Bowl promo editing controversy ===
On February 5, 2012, the station premiered the I-Team promo during NBC Sports' coverage of Super Bowl XLVI featuring former NYPD commissioner Ray Kelly, but later on the day after the Super Bowl, they edited out Kelly's clip due to some complaints from rival WCBS-TV. However, the spokesman declined to comment, and criticisms arose from WABC-TV, WNYW, and WPIX, the station's rivals. Station general manager Michael Jack said in the statement that "our investigative team is among the most experienced in the industry, and to suggest that the station won't cover the NYPD fairly, accurately and with balance simply because the commissioner appeared in a station promotional spot is simply not true". After the promo was edited out at the station, Lynda Baquero resigned from the investigative team but continued as a reporter for the station. She was replaced by Pei-Sze Cheng and Jonathan Vigliotti (though Vigliotti later left for WCBS-TV).

=== Tweet regarding antisemitic violence ===
On January 2, 2020, WNBC posted a tweet on its Twitter account linking to an Associated Press wire article, syndicated to its website, on the recent wave of antisemitic violence in the United States, coming three weeks after a targeted shooting at a kosher supermarket in Jersey City, New Jersey. The text of the message, likely automatically generated by the station's content management system, featured one of three bullet points summarizing the article as a whole, and stated that Orthodox Jews moving from the core of New York and New Jersey and into their own self-established communities on the fringe of the Tri-State area due to gentrification was a reason for an increase of violent anti-Semitic attacks in the broader region;

"With the expansion of Orthodox communities outside NYC has come civic sparring, and some fear the recent violence may be an outgrowth of that conflict"

WNBC's headline, and its inclusion in the tweet, was met with backlash from Jewish groups and people, including the progressive Zionist group Zioness and the Republican Jewish Coalition, which called out the station for "blaming the Orthodox community for the attacks". Others prominent in the community also questioned the message, including Bari Weiss, former New York State Assemblyman Dov Hikind, Ron Kampeas of the Jewish Telegraphic Agency, and The Forward's Batya Ungar-Sargon. The station later apologized for the original headline, deleted the original tweet, and then re-sent the article tweet with an edited headline.

== Technical information and subchannels ==
Former New York Nonstop logo from 2011 to 2012.

WNJU and WNBC transmit using WNJU's spectrum from an antenna atop One World Trade Center. The stations' signals are multiplexed:

Subchannels of WNJU and WNBC
License	Subchannel	Res.	Short name	Programming
WNJU	47.1	1080i	WNJU-HD	Telemundo
WNJU	47.2	480i	TeleX	TeleXitos
WNBC	4.1	1080i	WNBC	NBC
WNBC	4.2	480i	COZI-TV	Cozi TV
WNBC	4.3	480i	CRIMES	NBC True CRMZ
WNBC	4.4	480i	OXYGEN	Oxygen

On December 20, 2012, WNBC and other NBC-owned stations began carrying Cozi TV. It replaced NBC (New York) Nonstop, which had been carried on digital subchannel 4.2 since 2009.

== See also ==
- Channel 4 virtual TV stations in the United States
- Channel 35 digital TV stations in the United States
- Early television stations
- List of television stations in New York (by channel number)
- List of television stations in New York (by region)
- Media in New York City
- New Yorkers in journalism
