= Darlene Rodriguez =

American Actor

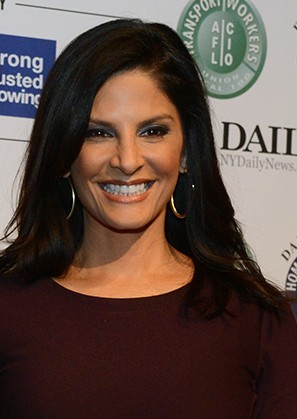
- Rodriguez at The Second Annual Daily News Hometown Heroes in Transit Awards, Jan 2014
- Born: Darlene Pomales; June 8, 1970 (age 56); New York City, US
- Education: University of Miami
- Occupations: Journalist and anchor on NBC Today Show
- Notable credit(s): Anchor and Correspondent (NBC, WNBC)
- Spouse: David Rodriguez

Darlene Rodriguez (née Pomales) is an American journalist and co-anchor of Today in New York on WNBC. Rodriguez became co-anchor of the show in July 2003 after serving as a reporter for WNBC and then co-anchor of Weekend Today in New York.

Rodriguez has also served as a fill-in newsreader for Ann Curry and later, Natalie Morales on The Today Show on NBC. Prior to working for WNBC, she was a general assignment reporter for WCBS Newsradio 88 for four years, and worked as a reporter for the BronxNet cable television network.

Rodriguez, who is of Puerto Rican ancestry is a native of the Bronx. She is a 1988 graduate of Christopher Columbus High School in that borough, and a 1992 graduate of the University of Miami with a degree in broadcast journalism and political science. While in college, Rodriguez was instrumental in creating various local cable news programs which focused on cross-cultural cuisines. Her passion for cooking and crocheting (which she learned as a child) still occupy most of her free time. She lives currently in Croton-on-Hudson, New York.

== See also ==
- New Yorkers in journalism
