= Robb Hanrahan =

American television journalist (1962–2022)

- Born: Robert John Hanrahan; April 11, 1962; Minneapolis, Minnesota, U.S.
- Died: July 1, 2022 (aged 60); Harrisburg, Pennsylvania, U.S.
- Occupation: Journalist
- Spouse: Stacey

Robert John Hanrahan (April 11, 1962 – July 1, 2022) was an American television journalist who previously worked as a newscaster for WHP-TV, the CBS affiliate in Harrisburg, Pennsylvania. He announced his retirement on February 7, 2021, after a six-month recovery from a massive heart attack.

== Career ==
Prior to joining WHP, he had spent time at WFOR-TV, a CBS owned-and-operated station in Miami, Florida, where he co-anchored newscasts alongside Maggie Rodriguez for four years.

Between 1996 and 2003, Hanrahan was an anchor at WABC-TV in New York City. He joined the station as a co-anchor for its morning and midday Eyewitness News broadcast, where he worked alongside Nancy Loo. By the end of 1997, Hanrahan was promoted and replaced Greg Hurst as co-anchor on WABC's 5:00 pm newscast alongside Roz Abrams and stayed there for the next several years. During this time, he was part of a second overhaul of the morning newscast; he and Lori Stokes were named to replace Loo and David Ushery as morning anchors, although Hanrahan did not participate in the noon newscast this time. Toward the end of his time at WABC, the station was undergoing another shakeup in its lineups and he was replaced by Diana Williams on the early evening newscasts. Hanrahan moved to anchoring solely on weekends until his contract expired.

Hanrahan was at WSVN-TV in Miami before joining WABC. Before Miami, he worked at Harrisburg's WHTM-TV, and started his news career at KODE-TV in Joplin, Missouri.

== Personal life and death ==
He was married to his wife Stacey. Hanrahan died on July 1, 2022, at the age of 60.

His wife is a licensed mariner who holds a United States Coast Guard fifty-ton Master/Mate (captain's) License.

== See also ==
- List of American journalists
- List of television reporters
