= Allison Rosati =

American television news anchor

- Born: February 12, 1963 (age 63); Dover, Delaware, U.S.
- Education: Pine City High School
- Alma mater: Gustavus Adolphus College (cum laude)
- Occupation: Journalist
- Years active: 1985-present
- Television: KTTC (1985-1987); WGRZ-TV (1987-1990); WMAQ-TV (1990-present)
- Spouse: Dr. Lee Dennis (1993-2017)
- Children: 4

Allison Kay Rosati (born February 12, 1963) is the 5 p.m., 6 p.m. and 10 p.m. newscast co-anchor for WMAQ-TV in Chicago, in the United States.

== Early life ==
Rosati was born in Dover, Delaware and grew up in Pine City, Minnesota. Rosati is of Finnish (paternal) and Italian (maternal) descent and is the child of Robert Rosati and Sharon Nowling. In 1980, she was crowned Minnesota's Junior Miss. In 1981 she represented Minnesota in the America's Junior Miss pageant, receiving a 'Spirit of Junior Miss' award alongside Idaho Junior Miss Kelly Jo Kreisher. During her teenage years, she worked as drive-thru shift leader at McDonald's. She attended Gustavus Adolphus College where she studied speech and communications. She was also a member of the school's choral group The Lucia Singers. She graduated cum laude in 1985.

== Career ==
Rosati started her career in Rochester, Minnesota in 1985. KTTC-TV hired her as a general assignment reporter, and less than a year later promoted her to producer and co-anchor of the 6 p.m. and 10 p.m. newscasts. Rosati later went to WGRZ-TV in Buffalo, New York, where she anchored the 6 p.m. and 11 p.m. newscasts and also did general assignment reporting. In 1989, she was the local co-host of The Jerry Lewis MDA Labor Day Telethon alongside Barry Lillis. She first came to WMAQ in Chicago in 1990 as host of First Thing in the Morning. During her morning tenure, Rosati co-hosted Chicago Live along with Warner Saunders from 1991 to 1992. In 1995 she began anchoring the afternoon news, and in May 1997, following the controversial hiring of Jerry Springer as commentator and the resignations of Ron Magers and Carol Marin, Rosati was promoted to co-anchor of NBC 5's 10 p.m. newscast, making her as a longest-reigning tenured late-evening news anchor in Chicago.

In August 1998, Rosati departed from the Afternoon Newscast in order to concentrate on the station's short-lived hour-long daytime program NBC 5 Chicago Daytime alongside Nesita Kwan and Byron Miranda. It was cancelled in 1999 due to low ratings. In April 1999, Rosati was promoted to co-anchor of NBC 5's 6 p.m. newscast after Joan Esposito left the station. In addition, Rosati also hosted the weekly segment Wednesday's Child from its inception in 1999 until its final report in 2005. In 2000, she became host, co-creator, and co-executive producer of half-hour special series MomTV. In September 2006, Rosati and Saunders were promoted to anchors of the 5 p.m. newscast, displacing Bob Sirott and Marion Brooks, while still anchoring the 4 p.m (later 4:30) newscasts. For a short time during the 2006 NFL football season, Rosati and Saunders anchored the 10 p.m. Sunday Newscast. After Saunders' retirement in 2009, Rob Stafford was selected Rosati's co-anchor for the NBC 5 evening newscasts. In August 2020, on the occasion of her 30th anniversary year with WMAQ, it was announced that Stefan Holt would be the new co-anchor of Rosati on the 10 p.m. newscasts beginning in October, ending her pairing with Stafford on the late news after 11 years. She will continue to pair with Stafford on the 5 p.m. and 6 p.m. newscasts. Rosati also hosts the web-only series "Happy to Report" in August 2021.

== Community work ==
Rosati volunteers for many Chicago-area organizations, such as Amate House, the Greater Chicago Food Depository, the Infant Welfare Society, the St. Jude Children's Research Hospital, the Children's Home + Aid, the Ronald McDonald House, and the March of Dimes. She has also helped Big Brothers Big Sisters of America, by sitting on the board of directors, and Gilda's Club Chicago, by serving as an honorary board member for the organization.

== Recognition and awards ==
- Chicago Emmy Award for her role as host in "NBC 5 Presents: Millennium 2000," 2000
- Named "Woman Of The Year" by the Italian American Police Association, 2001
- Dante Award from the Joint Civic Committee of Italian Americans, 2001
- Department of Health and Human Services Adoption Excellence Award from U.S. Secretary of Health and Human Services Tommy Thompson, 2002
- National Emmy for the "Survive Alive" Station Project and Fire Prevention special
- Excellence in Communications Award from the Justinian Society of Chicago
- David Award for "Achievement in Broadcasting"
- First Decade Award from Gustavus Adolphus College
- Distinguished Alumni award from Gustavus Adolphus College
- Spirit of Love Award from The Little City Foundation of Palatine, 2003
- Humanitarian Of The Year award from the Italian American Police Association, 2004
- Media Person of the Year award from the Italian American Chamber of Commerce Midwest Chapter, 2005
- Gracie Award for her role as host in "Smart Choices, Safe Kids" Documentary special, 2006
- "For the Love of Children" award from Children's Home + Aid, 2005
- Woman of the Year from Casa Italia Chicago, 2012
- Mary Ellen Nolan Guardian Angel Award from Amate House in Chicago, 2016
- The National Italian Invitational Golf Tournament for Charities Honoree, 2016
- 2016 Champions for Children Award from the Infant Welfare Society of Chicago, 2017
- Veritas Award from The Dominican Friars of the Province of St. Albert the Great, 2018

== Filmography ==
Year	Title	Role	Notes
1988	The Magical World of Disney	Herself (WGRZ anchor)	Episode: "Mickey's 60th Birthday"
1993	Justice for All: An Overview of the State Courts	Herself (Narrator)	
1994	ER	Herself (Anchor; uncredited)	Episode: "Blizzard"
2000	Mom TV	Herself (host)	also co-creator and co-executive producer
2006	Smart Choices, Safe Kids	Herself (host)	
2013	Journey to a Miracle: Freedom from Insulin - Pilot	Herself (host)	
2014	The Tonight Show Starring Jimmy Fallon	Herself (WMAQ-TV anchor)	I've Got Good News and Good News segment, one episode
2014	Steve Harvey	Herself (WMAQ-TV anchor)	one episode

== Personal life ==
Rosati was married to radiologist Dr. Lee Dennis in a traditional Roman Catholic wedding ceremony on March 20, 1993 at the Holy Name Cathedral. Rosati and Dennis have 4 kids including Nicholas Lee Dennis, Stephen Dennis, Katherine Mary Dennis, and Kristen Allison Dennis and a dog named Apollo. Rosati and Dennis were officially divorced on January 17, 2017.

In September 2020, Rosati went to undergo surgery due to an injury to her leg, but however because of the COVID-19 pandemic in Illinois which causing her age in their higher risk for severe illness, she is resting at home.
