= Lori Stokes =

American journalist and news anchor (born 1962)

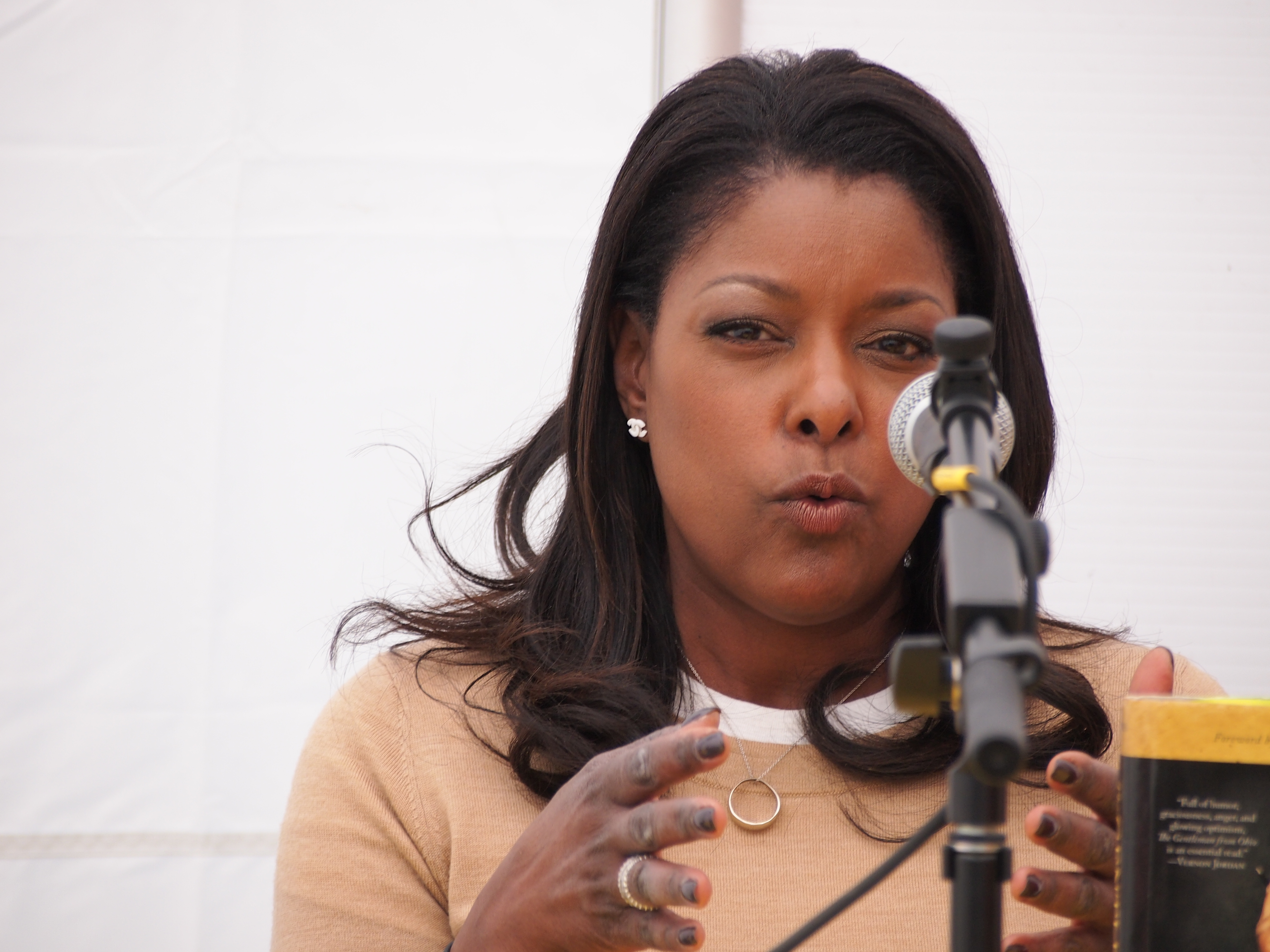
- Born: September 16, 1962 (age 63); Cleveland, Ohio, U.S.
- Education: Ohio State University; Howard University
- Occupation: Journalist
- Notable credit(s): Morning anchor on WABC-TV’s Eyewitness News This Morning (2000-2017); Co-host of Good Day New York (2017-2021)
- Spouse: Brian Thompson (divorced)
- Children: 2
- Parent: Louis Stokes (father)
- Relatives: Carl Stokes (uncle)

Lori Stokes (born September 16, 1962) is an American former journalist and news anchor. She was the evening news anchor for the 5, 6, and 10 O’Clock news at Fox 5 NY WNYW in New York City from 2021 to 2022. She formerly co-hosted Good Day New York on Fox 5 NY WNYW, with Rosanna Scotto. From April 2000 to August 2017, she co-anchored on WABC-TV's Eyewitness News This Morning, with Ken Rosato. Stokes joined the station as part of an effort to increase ratings on WABC's morning newscast and helped bring the broadcast to #1. Stokes retired from broadcasting on September 30, 2022.

== Career ==
Stokes began her journalistic career as the medical reporter and then weekend co-anchor at WCIA in Champaign-Urbana, Illinois in 1986. Then, in 1988, she worked as a reporter and weekend anchor for WBTV in Charlotte, North Carolina. There for two years, she became popular with the viewers in that state.

Next, Stokes worked as a crime and street reporter for WBFF-TV, the Fox Station in Baltimore. Finally, Stokes got hands on experience for full-time anchor as WJLA-TV's lead female anchor of the 6 p.m. and 11 p.m. newscasts. She was there from 1992 through 1996.

Then Stokes went to MSNBC at the time of its inception. She was one of the original anchors on the 24-hour cable news television channel and the first African American to speak on the cable news network. MSNBC hired newcomer "girl in glasses" Ashleigh Banfield to MSNBC in 2000 and replaced Stokes on MSNBC'S Today in America also in 2000. During her tenure at NBC News Stokes was a rotating newsreader for "NBC Sunrise" and Weekend Today.

During her tenure at the cable TV station, Stokes covered the Columbine High School Massacre and the death of John F. Kennedy Jr. in 1999.

=== Career in New York City ===
Stokes was paired with Robb Hanrahan who, at the time, also co-anchored the station's 5 p.m. news with Roz Abrams and had previously co-anchored the morning news. The new pair, who replaced anchors Nancy Loo and David Ushery, did not work as well as WABC had hoped they would. Hanrahan was taken off the morning news in December 2000 and replaced with WABC-TV's weekend sports anchor Steve Bartelstein.

Stokes and Bartelstein proved to work well and eventually helped bring Eyewitness News This Morning back to the number one position it had enjoyed in previous years. The pair eventually took over anchoring duties for Eyewitness News at Noon, replacing Nancy Loo and David Ushery once again.

For a brief time in 2003, Stokes was removed from the noon newscast and replaced with Sade Baderinwa. Stokes resumed anchoring the noon newscast when Roz Abrams left the station and was replaced by Baderinwa.

From Tuesday, March 13, 2007, to Wednesday, July 4, 2007, (Independence Day), Stokes was the sole anchor of Eyewitness News This Morning and Eyewitness News at Noon. She was joined by a rotating roster of reporters from March until July when reporter Ken Rosato was chosen to permanently replace Steve Bartelstein. Rosato officially took over on July 9, 2007, as her morning and noon co-anchor.

In fall 2010, the morning newscast expanded to begin at 4:30 a.m. and, in fall 2014, the noon news expanded to a full hour, which lengthened Stokes' and Rosato's already long days. As part of the expansion, WABC promised to relieve both of them of their noon duties in order to focus on the morning news. That promise was kept and, in June 2015, Stokes and Rosato handed over noon duties to David Novarro and Shirleen Allicot.

Lori Stokes left Eyewitness News in August 2017 and, on October 4, 2017, started her tenure as co-host of Good Day New York with Rosanna Scotto on Fox 5 WNYW replacing Greg Kelly. WNYW promoted Stokes to anchoring the station’s evening broadcasts in June 2021.

Stokes retired from broadcasting on September 30, 2022.

== See also ==
- New Yorkers in journalism
