= Michelle Charlesworth =

American journalist (born 1970)

- Born: June 7, 1970 (age 56)
- Education: Duke University (BA); University of Freiburg
- Occupations: journalist, television personality
- Notable credit(s): Reporter for ABC News and Reporter/Anchor for WABC-TV in New York City (1998 - present)
- Children: 2
- Relatives: James H. Charlesworth (father)

Michelle Charlesworth (born June 7, 1970) is an American television news reporter and anchor. Since 1998 she has been a reporter for both ABC News and WABC-TV, as well as a weekend morning anchor for WABC-TV's Eyewitness News.

She is best known for an award-winning series of reports about her battle with skin cancer, which aired on both WABC-TV and ABC's Good Morning America. A dermatologist was being interviewed on the air by Charlesworth and thought a mark on her face was basal cell carcinoma, which a biopsy later confirmed.

== Early life and education ==
Charlesworth was born in Durham where she lived until she was twelve years old. Her father James H. Charlesworth is a professor at Duke University.

An alumna of Princeton High School in Princeton, New Jersey, she graduated from Duke University with a Bachelor of Arts in public policy and studied economics in a graduate program on a full scholarship from the German government at the University of Freiburg.

== Career ==
She worked as an anchor and reporter for WNCN-TV in North Carolina from 1996 to 1998, and also at WABC-TV.

She was recently on a long list of WABC-TV reporters in line to replace fired Eyewitness News This Morning co-anchor Steve Bartelstein. Another candidate for the anchor seat was reporter Lisa Colagrossi. Ken Rosato became the co-anchor with Lori Stokes on July 6, 2007.

Charlesworth continues to substitute regularly for Ken Rosato or Shirleen Allicot, thus prompting others, including Toni Yates, and, prior to her death, Lisa Colagrossi to fill in for her on the Weekend Morning broadcasts with Rob Nelson.

She was the first person to report live from New York during the September 11 attacks.

In 2002, Charlesworth received the Gold Triangle Award from the American Academy of Dermatology for her reporting on skin cancer.

== In popular culture ==
Charlesworth features in the 2008 fictional novel Perksy's Last Year by Stanley Hart.

== Personal life and health ==
Charlesworth lives in New Jersey with her husband, they have two children.

A dermatologist was being interviewed on the air by Charlesworth and thought a mark on her face was basal cell carcinoma, which a biopsy later confirmed.

== See also ==
- New Yorkers in journalism
