= Garrick Utley =

American television journalist (1939–2014)

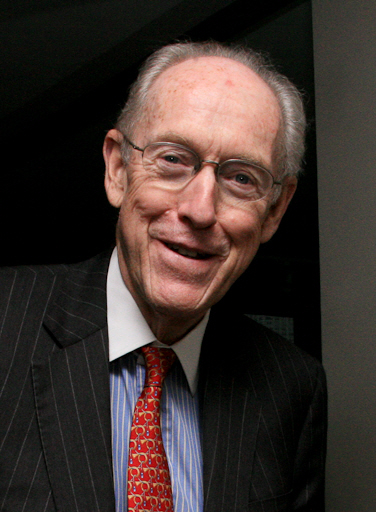
- Utley on May 14, 2012
- Born: Clifton Garrick Utley; November 19, 1939; Chicago, Illinois, U.S.
- Died: February 20, 2014 (aged 74); New York City, U.S.
- Education: Carleton College
- Occupation: Television journalist
- Known for: Work at NBC News, PBS, ABC News, and CNN
- Spouse: Gertje Rommeswinkel (m. 1973)

Clifton Garrick Utley (November 19, 1939 – February 20, 2014) was an American television journalist. He established his career reporting about the Vietnam War and has the distinction of being the first full-time television correspondent covering the war on-site.

== Early life ==
Utley was born in Chicago, Illinois. He graduated from Westtown School, a Quaker boarding school in Westtown, Pennsylvania, in 1957 and from Carleton College in 1961. His parents, Frayn and Clifton Utley, were correspondents for the NBC Radio Network and NBC Television Network in the mid-20th century, based in Chicago.

== Career ==
=== NBC News ===
Utley joined NBC News in 1963 as researcher in Europe for The Huntley-Brinkley Report, where he became Foreign and Principal correspondent. Besides covering the Vietnam War, Utley reported from many other areas, including stints as bureau chief in London and Paris. He reported on events within the U.S. as well.

Utley was also an anchor. He served as weekend anchor from 1971–1973, and frequently substituted for John Chancellor during that decade and for Tom Brokaw in the 1980s on NBC Nightly News and some for Maria Shriver while she was on maternity leave in 1989. He also filled in for Bryant Gumbel as host of Today. Utley was news anchor for Sunday Today from 1987 to 1988 and frequently substituted for Boyd Matson, and then co-anchored the program from 1988 to 1992. Utley also served again as main weekend anchor (Sunday initially, and both Saturday and Sunday later) from 1987 to 1993 of NBC Nightly News. One noteworthy Nightly News broadcast Utley appeared on January 22, 1973, the day the U.S. Supreme Court handed down its Roe v. Wade decision. In the midst of that broadcast (fed to affiliates at 6:30 p.m. Eastern), and just before reporting on the decision, news broke that former U.S. President Lyndon B. Johnson had died.

In the 1970s, Utley frequently hosted newsmagazine-style programs for NBC News. In the UK, he covered the February 1974 British General Election and appeared on the BBC election-night program. In the US, from January 1989 to December 1991, he moderated NBC's long-running public affairs discussion program Meet the Press, while simultaneously hosting the newly debuted Sunday version of the Today Show. In 1992, Utley issued a controversial commentary essay at the close of a weekend newscast, expressing a view that then-President George H. W. Bush should forgo reelection in the interest of the country.

=== PBS ===
For a time, Utley hosted the PBS opera series Live from the Met, during which he introduced the televised performances and interviewed the participants during intermissions.

=== ABC News and CNN ===
Utley worked for NBC News for 30 years before moving to ABC as chief foreign correspondent in 1993. He later moved to CNN in 1997, where he worked until 2002. He co-anchored CNN's coverage of the terrorist attacks of September 11, 2001, during the early morning hours of September 12, 2001.

=== Later career ===
After leaving network television, Utley was a professor of broadcasting and journalism at the State University of New York at Oswego and was senior fellow at the SUNY Levin Institute of the State University of New York in Manhattan, from which he retired as head in December 2011. He also co-hosted America Abroad on public radio, a program that examines the United States' role and relationships in the world, and hosted Metropolitan Opera broadcasts on public television.

He authored You Should Have Been Here Yesterday (2000), a narrative of the growth of television news in the United States. Board service included The Council on Foreign Relations (1993–2003), Carleton College (1983–2007), Public Radio International (1996–2008), the Board of Advisors of Doctors without Borders, and Chairman of the American Council on Germany.

== Death ==
Utley died on February 20, 2014, at the age of 74, from prostate cancer. He was survived by his wife, Gertje Utley (née Rommeswinkel); his brothers, David and Jonathan; and his sister-in-law, Carol Marin, a longtime reporter at NBC station WMAQ.

Media offices
| Preceded by Chris Wallace | Meet the Press Moderator; January 8, 1989 – December 1, 1991 | Succeeded by Tim Russert |
