= Daniella Guzman =

American journalist

Daniella Guzmán
- Born: February 14, 1982 (age 44); Sugar Land, Texas, U.S.
- Education: University of St. Thomas (BA); Univision KTMD (2004–2006); KPRC-TV (2006–2012; 2022–present); WMAQ-TV (2012–2014); KNBC (2014–2021)
- Occupation: Journalist
- Spouse: Hector Gonzalez (2005–2024)
- Children: 2

Daniella Guzman (born February 14, 1982) is an American journalist.

== Early life ==
Guzman was born in Sugar Land, Texas. She is fluent in Spanish and graduated from University of St. Thomas with a B.A. in bilingual journalism and communications.

== Career ==
Early in her career, she worked with the Univision network in Miami, Florida. She moved to Telemundo-owned station KTMD in Houston, Texas, from 2004 until she joined NBC-affiliated station KPRC-TV as a general assignment reporter and weekend anchor for what was then known as Local 2 News in 2006. Known for her dynamic reporting, she has covered many prominent news stories, including Hurricanes Ike, Dolly and Gustav. She was one of the first reporters on the scene to cover the 2009 Fort Hood shooting. In 2012, she was named co-anchor of WMAQ-TV's weekday morning newscasts along with Stefan Holt, replacing Rob Elgas and Zoraida Sambolin, who returned to the station in 2014. In June 2014, Guzman joined KNBC in Los Angeles as a co-anchor of Today in L.A. alongside Whit Johnson after Alycia Lane left the station in 2013. In May 2016, L.A. Parent Magazine hired Daniella as a contributor to the magazine, the magazine debuts its column "On The Record: Straight Talk For Moms" in which, she is now also a magazine contributor in addition to its anchor duties at KNBC.

On November 1, 2021, KPRC-TV announced that Guzman will return to Houston to anchor KPRC 2 News at 6 and 10 p.m. beginning in January 2022. Guzman will replace Dominique Sachse, who departed from the station three days prior to the announcement.

== Community work ==
Guzman volunteered for many Chicago-area and Los Angeles-area organizations such as March of Dimes, The Service Club, BuildOn and many others. She has also helped the Ronald McDonald House by sitting on the organization's House of Representatives.

== Personal life ==
In addition to her broadcasting career, she also worked in print media, advertising and public relations. She lives in the Houston area with her husband, Hector Gonzalez. On June 23, 2011, her daughter Sofia Villegas was born. Her second daughter Olivia was born on October 1, 2015.
