= Mark Schonwetter Holocaust Education Foundation =

Holocaust education foundation

- Company type: Non-Profit
- Founded: 2019
- Headquarters: Livingston, New Jersey, U.S.
- Key people: Mark Schonwetter (co-founder); Ann S. Arnold (co-founder); Isabella S. Fiske (co-founder); Holly Ash; Michael Ash; Peggy Edelson; Andrea Gershwin; Julie Kaplan; Andrew Wayne; Claudia Oshry
- Website: www.mshefoundation.org

The Mark Schonwetter Holocaust Education Foundation ("MSHEF") is a nonprofit organization dedicated to funding educational grants to provide learning materials and books, support field trips and programming, and bring Holocaust survivor speakers into schools and classrooms nationwide.

Since its founding, the MSHEF has reached over 200,000 students with its educational programs and distributed approximately $300,000 in grants to educators in 32 states. The Foundation has also partnered with school districts and local governments to expand Holocaust education beyond traditional classrooms, incorporating community events and public awareness campaigns.

== History ==
MSHEF was established in late 2019 by Ann S. Arnold and Isabella S. Fiske, daughters of Holocaust survivor Mark Schonwetter. Schonwetter had survived the Holocaust as a young boy alongside his sister and his mother. Schonwetter often shared his story of survival with students, accompanied by his daughters. Their visits revealed a widespread lack of funding for Holocaust education, inspiring the family to create a foundation to help fill this gap.

When MSHEF was founded, only 12 U.S. states required Holocaust education in schools. The Foundation's mission focuses on promoting awareness, fostering understanding, and combating ignorance about the Holocaust through educational grants and resources.

== Grants ==
The Foundation offers grants of up to $1,000 annually to teachers nationwide, supporting a variety of Holocaust education initiatives. Examples of funded programs include:

- A Holocaust and Genocide Research Center in Sussex County, New Jersey.
- Field trips to Holocaust memorials and museums.
- The purchase of Holocaust-related books and materials for classrooms.

As of 2024, the Foundation has distributed nearly $300,000 in funding, empowering educators to teach critical lessons about tolerance and human rights.

== Journey For The Living ==
Journey For The Living ("JFTL") is the MSHEF's yearly fitness fundraiser dedicated to building awareness and supporting their mission to teach anti-hate initiatives, respect, and kindness to students nationwide through Holocaust education. Participants walk, run, or ride at least 15 miles in one month to represent the journey that Mark Schonwetter walked in one night, along with his sister and mother, to escape the Nazis.

At the annual in-person Journey For The Living event in Livingston, New Jersey, MSHEF honors a Voice of Kindness award recipient, whose dedication to Holocaust education has supported the mission of the Foundation. Many notable figures have been honored, including founder Mark Schonwetter, comedian and Board Member Claudia Oshry, and ABC7NY anchor Michelle Charlesworth. Jewish students around the country have participated in the Journey For The Living as part of their Mitzvah Project.

== Recognition ==
MSHEF has been recognized for its contributions to Holocaust education, receiving endorsements from educators and community leaders nationwide. Its initiatives have been featured in reputable outlets such as the 3rd Hour of TODAY, Teen Vogue, ABC7NY, and Jewish News Syndicate, highlighting its role in shaping Holocaust education in the United States. Their mission has been spread on across Times Square.

Co-founders Ann Arnold and Isabella Fiske have each been honored with the Simon Wiesenthal Center Heroes for Tolerance award for their work in actively combatting hate, bias, and antisemitism.
