= Tom Llamas =

American journalist (born 1979)

- Tom Llamas at the 2026 conference of the National Association of Hispanic Journalists
- Born: Thomas Edward Llamas; July 2, 1979 (age 47); Miami, Florida, U.S.
- Education: Loyola University New Orleans (BA)
- Occupations: Television news anchor and television journalist
- Years active: 2000–present
- Employer: NBCUniversal
- Agent: UTA
- Notable credit(s): ABC World News Tonight Sunday (anchor/weekday correspondent) (2014–2021); NBC News (correspondent/substitute anchor); Top Story with Tom Llamas (anchor) (2021–present); Today (substitute news anchor) (2021–2025); NBC Nightly News (anchor) (2025–present)
- Spouse: Jennifer Llamas (m. 2006)
- Children: 3

Thomas Edward Llamas (/ˈjɑːmɑːs/ YAH-mahs; born July 2, 1979) is an American journalist working for NBC News as the anchor of NBC Nightly News and Top Story with Tom Llamas.

He worked for ABC News as the weekend anchor of ABC World News Tonight from 2014 until 2021, before joining NBC News as the senior national correspondent and anchor for NBC News Now, hosting Top Story with Tom Llamas, and serving as a substitute anchor for Today and NBC Nightly News.

On March 5, 2025, Llamas was named to succeed Lester Holt as host and managing editor of NBC Nightly News beginning June 2, 2025. Llamas is the first Latino anchor of an American nightly news broadcast.

Llamas has won multiple Emmy Awards for his reporting in addition to two Edward R. Murrow awards.

== Early life ==
Llamas was born in Miami on July 2, 1979, to Cuban immigrant parents who had fled the island as political refugees. He attended Belen Jesuit Preparatory School in Tamiami, Florida and became a fan of the Miami Hurricanes football team. He graduated from Loyola University New Orleans in Louisiana with a bachelor's degree in broadcast journalism and one in drama and speech. He was also a member of the Louisiana Gamma chapter of Sigma Phi Epsilon, a fraternity.

== Career ==
Llamas began his broadcasting career at the age of 15 as an intern for the news department at WSCV in Hialeah, Florida. Llamas returned to Miami after graduating from college and working in various behind-the-scenes roles at NBC News for an on-air position at NBC affiliate WTVJ.

He joined WNBC and NBC News in New York in 2009 as general-assignment reporter and anchor. In September 2014, he moved to ABC News as a New York-based correspondent and substituted for David Muir on ABC World News Tonight during the Christmas 2014 break. Llamas became the Sunday anchor of ABC World News Tonight in 2015 and the sole weekend anchor of the program in January 2017.

During the 2016 U.S. presidential campaign, Llamas reported on the Republican candidates. He criticized the use by Jeb Bush and Donald Trump of the term "anchor baby" and was called a "sleaze" by Trump after questioning him about the amount of money he had donated to charity.

In January 2021, it was reported that Llamas would leave ABC News and return to NBC News. His last broadcast on ABC News was on January 31, 2021. In April 2021, it was announced that Llamas was named the senior national correspondent for NBC News and would anchor a primetime newscast for NBC News Now beginning May 3, 2021. A rebroadcast of the newscast, Top Story with Tom Llamas, was added to the overnight schedule of most NBC stations on weeknights on March 28, 2022, replacing a replay of Today's fourth hour show.

On March 5, 2025, NBC News announced Llamas would be the successor to Lester Holt as anchor and the managing editor of NBC Nightly News. Llamas continues to anchor Top Story. He debuted as the anchor for Nightly News on June 2, 2025.

== Awards ==
Llamas has won several awards including an Emmy Award for "Best Anchor" and "Best Hard News Story" and a regional Edward R. Murrow Award for WNBC's coverage of Hurricane Sandy. He was awarded his first Emmy in 2008 for his reporting as the first TV journalist to work on a human smuggling interdiction at sea with the U.S. Coast Guard. He won an Emmy Award in 2013 for his coverage of Hurricane Irene.

Throughout his career, Llamas has been recognized with several honors, such as the Presidential Award of Impact from the National Association of Hispanic Journalists and the El Award from El Diario La Prensa. In 2022, he and his team earned NAHJ’s Al Neuharth Award for excellence in investigative reporting. He was also a member of the WNBC team that received a Murrow Award in 2014 for their live coverage of Hurricane Sandy.

== Personal life ==
Llamas and his wife, Jennifer, have three children. The family lived for three years in a Midtown East three-bedroom apartment in Manhattan before moving to Purchase in Harrison, New York in 2022. Llamas and his wife are Catholic.

Media offices
Preceded by Lester Holt	NBC Nightly News Weekday Edition Anchor; 2025–present	Succeeded by Incumbent
