= Carol Marin =

American journalist

- Born: October 10, 1948 (age 77)
- Occupations: Television and print journalist
- Years active: 1972–2020
- Known for: Reporter/anchor at WMAQ-TV
- Spouse: Jonathan Utley
- Family: Garrick Utley (brother-in-law)

Carol Marin (pronounced "marine") (born October 10, 1948) is a retired television and print journalist based in Chicago, Illinois.

== Career ==
Marin began her journalism career in 1972 at WBIR-TV in Knoxville, Tennessee, as a reporter, anchor, and assistant news director. In 1976, she moved to WSM-TV in Nashville, where she was instrumental in the investigative reporting that ultimately led to the ouster and indictment of then-Tennessee Governor Ray Blanton. In 1978, Marin was hired by the NBC-owned and operated station WMAQ-TV, in Chicago, where she worked for almost two decades.

On May 1, 1997, she resigned her position as 6 and 10 p.m. news anchor in protest of the station's decision to give Jerry Springer a commentary segment on the evening news program that she anchored; her co-anchor Ron Magers resigned a few weeks later for the same reason. After the two anchors left the station, ratings plummeted and Springer quit.

Two months later, Marin and producer Don Moseley were hired by CBS News. In a dual assignment, she worked as a network correspondent and an investigative reporter for WBBM-TV, the CBS station in Chicago. From 1997 to 2002, Marin reported for the CBS News programs 60 Minutes, 60 Minutes II, and Evening News with Dan Rather.

In 2002, Marin and Moseley left CBS to form an independent documentary company, Marin Corp Productions. They have produced programs for CNN and The New York Times/Discovery Channel. Marin Corp Productions is housed at DePaul University, where they teach DePaul students journalistic ethics at the Center for Journalism Integrity and Excellence.

In 2004, Marin returned to WMAQ as the station's political editor. She was the political columnist for the Chicago Sun-Times since 2004. In 2006, she signed on as a contributor to Chicago Tonight on WTTW, a public broadcasting station in Chicago. She often moderates panels on politics.

Marin announced in September 2020 that she would be leaving WMAQ and WTTW following the general election in November. Her final appearance on WTTW was November 5, 2020, and she had her final sign-off on WMAQ on November 6, 2020. WMAQ recapped her years in broadcasting on her final episode.

== Awards ==
Marin received the Peabody Award in 1997 for her body of work. She and Moseley received another Peabody in 1998 for their documentary on the facially disfigured. They also received national Emmys in 1989 and 1998, as well as two Alfred I. duPont-Columbia Awards in 1986 and 1998 for their reporting. Marin also won the Gracie Award from American Women in Radio & Television in 2002. She and Chicago Sun-Times colleagues Tim Novak and Chris Fusco received the 2014 George Polk Award in Journalism for their reporting on the killing of David Koschman. In 2015, she received a third Peabody award for her reporting on the police shooting of Laquan McDonald. She received an honorary degree from Governors State University at the 47th commencement ceremony on May 19, 2018. In 2025, the governor of the State of Illinois designated her a Lincoln Laureate; the Order of Lincoln is the state's highest honor for professional achievement and public service.

== Personal life ==
Marin graduated from Palatine High School and the University of Illinois at Urbana-Champaign. She is married to World War II historian and author Jonathan Utley, professor emeritus of the University of Tennessee. Marin was the sister-in-law to the late journalist Garrick Utley.
