= Warner Saunders =

American journalist (1935–2018)

Warner Saunders (January 30, 1935, Chicago, Illinois – October 9, 2018, Chicago, Illinois) was a 10 PM news co-anchor for WMAQ-TV in Chicago. Saunders' primary co-anchor in the NBC 5 evening newscasts was Allison Rosati. A Chicago native, Saunders held a bachelor's degree from Xavier University of Louisiana and a master's degree from Northeastern Illinois University. He and his wife, Sadako, lived in Chicago.

== Career ==
He was a member of the Chicago Journalism Hall of Fame and the Chicago Academy of Television Arts and Sciences' Silver Circle. He was once President of the Chicago Association of Black Journalists (1996–97). He produced a series of reports from South Africa in 1990 on the historic release of Nelson Mandela, culminating in the documentary titled South Africa: What Happens to a Dream Deferred? Saunders came to WMAQ from WBBM where he was Director of Community Affairs, host of Common Ground, and a children's show known to many kids as The Good Gang Express.

He portrayed a news anchorman in the second season of the drama series ER, the show also being set in Chicago and airing on NBC. He played a similar role in the second season of The West Wing, a show from the same producers as ER.

Saunders was a former public school teacher, youth worker and Boys Club Executive Director. A documentary for Chicago's WBBM-TV, The End of the Line, spurred investigations of local gangs. His teaching career includes Chicago Public Schools, National College of Education (now National Louis University), Malcolm X College, Northeastern Illinois University, and Indiana University where he was voted teacher of the year for two consecutive terms.

Saunders retired from the 5 PM and 6 PM newscasts and retired from the 10 PM newscast on May 20, 2009. He planned to pursue "diversity education".

He publicly accused former Chicago newspaper columnist Robert Feder of racism during Feder's career at the Sun-Times.

His career in broadcasting was honored by the Museum of Broadcast Communications on May 16, 2009, during "A Salute to Warner Saunders", an event held at the Fairmont Hotel in Chicago.

== Death ==
On the evening of October 9, 2018, Saunders collapsed in Chicago and was taken to Illinois Masonic Hospital in Lincoln Park, where he was pronounced dead at age 83.

== Awards ==
He won 20 Emmy Awards for news, sports, documentaries, children's shows, talk shows, and town meetings. Other awards included the Illinois Broadcasters Association Public Service Award, the Gabriel Award, The Ohio State Award, and the 1999 Hull House Jane Addams Award for his commitment to the Chicago community.

== Xavier University of Louisiana ==
Saunders was a standout basketball player at Xavier. He scored 32 points in a 71–67 home victory against city rival Dillard on January 11, 1956.
