= Disappearance of Lisa Stebic =

American missing person

Lisa Michelle Stebic
- Born: May 19, 1969; Illinois, United States
- Disappeared: April 30, 2007 (aged 37); Plainfield, Illinois
- Status: Missing for 19 years, 3 months and 19 days

Lisa Michelle Stebic, née Ruttenberg (born May 19, 1969) is an American missing person. The mother of two went missing from her home in Plainfield, Illinois on April 30, 2007.

Stebic is 5 feet 2 inches (1.57 m) tall, 120 pounds (54 kg), with brown hair and brown eyes. She has two visible tattoos, a small rose on her ankle and a large butterfly on her lower back.

== Case ==
Her case has received widespread news coverage. Her husband, Craig Stebic, refused to talk to the police or to help in the investigation or search. The local CBS affiliate (WBBM-TV) broadcast a video of a rival station's reporter Amy Jacobson at the Stebic home wearing a bikini.

Jacobson, Craig Stebic's sister, Jill Webb, and her husband, Robert Webb, have all filed lawsuits against WBBM regarding airing of the video. Craig Stebic has never been named a suspect by police, although he has been called "a person of interest" in his wife's disappearance.

In October 2007, the FBI added pictures of Lisa and information about her disappearance to its kidnapped and missing persons website. Stebic's photo and information were shown on national television at the end of the October 11, 2007, broadcast of Without A Trace, a CBS drama about an FBI missing-persons team in New York City and detailed the next morning on The Early Show.

In 2019, Plainfield Police Chief John Konopek said, “We’re closer than we were [on] day one, I will tell you that. My gut as a police officer tells me that there’s absolutely somebody out there who knows exactly what happened to Lisa. And we still consider Craig [Stebic] a person of interest.”

As of 2026 Stebic, remained missing, with her family member Melanie Greenberg saying the disappearance had "become a very cold case" and that her family believes Stebic is dead, and speculated that the investigation might have been different if Plainfield was not at the time such a small town.

== See also ==
- List of people who disappeared mysteriously: post-1970
