= Mystery of the Crystal Skulls =

- Genre: Documentary
- Written by: Kevin Huffman
- Presented by: Lester Holt
- Starring: Jaime Awe; Bill Homann
- Country of origin: United States
- Original language: English

Original release
- Network: Sci-Fi Channel
- Release: May 18, 2008

Mystery of the Crystal Skulls is a 2008 American documentary television film hosted by Lester Holt and starring Jaime Awe and Bill Homann. The film is about crystal skulls, hardstone carvings of human skulls whose alleged finders have claimed are pre-Columbian Mesoamerican artifacts.
