= Amy Jacobson =

American radio and television broadcaster

Amy Jacobson is a Chicago radio talk show host. She was a reporter for WMAQ-TV in Chicago from 1996 to 2007, losing her job after a rival TV station broadcast a video of her in a bathing suit with her children at the home of a man she was investigating in connection with his wife's disappearance.

== Early life and education ==
According to Jacobson's WMAQ-TV staff biography in 2007, she is a native of Mt. Prospect, Illinois, graduated from John Hersey High School in 1987, and graduated Phi Beta Kappa from the University of Iowa with a bachelor's degree in broadcasting and film in 1991. She was the Sigma Chi sweetheart in 1989.

== Early reporting ==
Prior to joining WMAQ-TV, Jacobson worked at WJBK-TV in Detroit, KVIA-TV in El Paso, Texas, KOLD-TV in Tucson, Arizona, and, starting in 1992, KSAX-TV in Alexandria, Minnesota. She started out with an internship at KGAN-TV based in Cedar Rapids, Iowa.

She became a general assignment reporter at NBC-owned WMAQ-TV in Chicago in 1996. She also occasionally contributed correspondent content for NBC News in regard to Chicago-area stories, having four appearances on Today.

== Stebic controversy ==
Jacobson, as part of her job for WMAQ-TV, had been covering the April 2007 disappearance of Lisa Stebic; Stebic went missing on the same day that she asked her lawyer to help evict her husband Craig Stebic from the Stebic home. On Friday, July 6, 2007, Jacobson was recorded on video socializing at the Stebic home. Jacobson was wearing a bathing suit top and a towel and was at the house with her two sons. Several other people were present including Craig Stebic, who was the last to see his wife, and was following his lawyer's advice to avoid speaking to police, but was in the video talking to Jacobson and Craig Stebic's sister, who Jacobson later said had invited her to the home to discuss the case with family members.

The video was in the possession of rival TV station WBBM-TV, but other news outlets, including Jacobson's employer WMAQ-TV, soon found out about the Jacobson footage. WBBM-TV discussed whether the footage was newsworthy until the evening of July 9, when the Chicago Sun-Times and Chicago Tribune both ran the story that Jacobson was on tape at a Stebic pool party. Seeing that the print media had already broken the story, WBBM-TV ran two minutes of clips from the video, with commentary from a WBBM-TV reporter, on the July 10 early-morning news. WBBM-TV also reported that, since the disappearance, Jacobson had not mentioned any social relationship with the Stebic family in her reporting, but had been seen at the house frequently and without a camera crew. Jacobson claimed she was trying to cultivate sources: she said she was attempting to get closer access to Craig Stebic; other sources told the Chicago Tribune that Jacobson was attempting a rapport with Craig Stebic's sister. Jacobson's involvement in the case resulted in national coverage and the end of her employment at WMAQ-TV by the end of July 10. Jacobson said that she would not have been fired if she were a man and that she went instantly from a six-figure income to not being able to find work anywhere. Both Jacobson and WBBM-TV received negative criticism. WBBM-TV responded by releasing the videotape, unedited except for the children's faces, the day after the original broadcast; Jacobson responded by limiting her interviews to local news outlets rather than national news outlets.

In July 2008, Jacobson filed a multi-million-dollar libel lawsuit in Cook County against WBBM's parent company CBS Corporation, multiple WBBM-TV staff, a Northwestern University professor who spoke about the footage, and a neighbor of the Stebic home. The lawsuit claimed that “the videotape was carefully edited in an attempt to create the appearance of an ‘illicit’ relationship" and Jacobson said that there were other mothers with children at the home when the video was shot. A circuit judge rejected the lawsuit and granted summary judgment in favor of CBS in July 2013, saying that the CBS criticism and report was "constitutionally protected expressions of opinion" or based on facts, and that the plaintiff failed to establish that CBS fabricated unfavorable content. Jacobson's attorney said that her legal team "always figured there would be an appeal before this went to trial", and intended to appeal on the basis that Jacobson was not a public figure when the video was released and that an earlier judge in the case had made a different ruling. The Illinois Appellate Court, sitting as a three-judge panel, rejected the appeal in December 2014, saying that Jacobson was "[a]lready a well-known local personality and high-profile reporter", that she drew further public spotlight during the period after Lisa Stebic's disappearance, and that her closer involvement with the family "invited scrutiny of her methods". The appellate court also said that the different ruling in the earlier court, claimed by Jacobson, was not actually the statement made by that court. Jacobson petitioned the Illinois Supreme Court, but was denied leave to appeal on January 28, 2015.

The season 18 episode of Law & Order entitled "Submission," which aired on March 12, 2008, creatively borrowed from events pertaining to the Jacobson story.

== Later career ==
Jacobson made frequent guest appearances on "Livin' Large with Geoff Pinkus" on WIND (AM) and worked as a traffic and news reporter for WLS (AM) from 2008 to 2010, beginning on the Roe Conn Show, and then moving to the Mancow and Cassidy show. She became co-host with Big John Howell on WIND.

Jacobson cohosted WIND's morning show, Chicago's Morning Answer, with Dan Proft from March 2015 until July 2025 when she separated from WIND. On their August 22, 2024, show, the pair mocked the 17-year old son of Democratic vice presidential candidate Tim Walz for his enthusiastic response to his dad being nominated for vice president of the United States at the 2024 Democratic National Convention. The son has a nonverbal learning disorder that affects one's physical coordination and ability to read social cues. Jacobson and Proft apologized the following morning for their remarks about Walz, admitting they were unaware of his learning disability during the previous day's segment. Parents at Amundsen High School in Chicago, where Jacobson coaches volleyball, called for her immediate dismissal. On August 28, Amundsen principal Kristi Eilers announced via email that Amundsen and Jacobsen had parted ways.

Jacobson has returned to AM560 on February 2, 2026 as cohost of a midday show titled The Real Story with former gubernatorial candidate Jeanne Ives. The show's tag line targets Illinois policy issues and promises to educate the public by interviewing experts, not pundits.

== Personal ==
Jacobson and her former husband, Jaime Anglada, married in 2002. They have two sons. Her husband filed for divorce in September 2008, following the lawsuit filed against WBBM-TV.
