= Lester Holt =

American journalist and news anchor (born 1959)

- Holt in 2026
- Born: March 8, 1959 (age 67); Marin County, California, U.S.
- Education: California State University, Sacramento (no degree)
- Occupations: Journalist; news anchor
- Years active: 1981–present
- Employer(s): CBS (1981–2000); NBC (2000–present)
- Notable credit(s): NBC Nightly News weeknight anchor (2015–2025); Weekend Today co-anchor (2003–2015); NBC Nightly News weekend anchor (2007–2015); Dateline NBC anchor (2011–present)
- Television: CBS News (1981–2000); NBC News (2000–present)
- Term: Anchor of NBC Nightly News and NBC Nightly News Kids Edition
- Predecessor: Brian Williams
- Successor: Tom Llamas
- Political party: Independent (2018–present); Republican (until 2018)
- Spouse: Carol Hagen (m. 1982)
- Children: 2, including Stefan
- Awards: Robert F. Kennedy Journalism Award 1990

Lester Don Holt Jr. (born March 8, 1959) is an American journalist who was the news anchor for the weekday edition of NBC Nightly News, NBC Nightly News Kids Edition, and is currently news anchor for Dateline NBC. On June 18, 2015, Holt was made the permanent anchor of NBC Nightly News following the Iraq War-reporting controversy of Brian Williams. Holt followed in the career footsteps of Max Robinson, an ABC News evening co-anchor, and became the first Black male solo anchor for a major network newscast.

According to a 2018 poll, Holt was ranked as being the most trusted TV news anchor in America. Holt also moderated the first presidential debate of 2016 to mixed reviews; being credited for fact-checking the candidates for false statements while struggling to keep control of the debate and unable to adhere to time restrictions. While NBC Nightly News was the top-ranked evening news program for over 30 years during the Tom Brokaw and Brian Williams eras, ratings dropped to second place after Holt began as anchor.

On May 30, 2025, Holt left NBC Nightly News after nearly ten years as host, in order to become the full-time host of NBC news magazine show Dateline following his departure.

Holt is an accomplished bass guitarist who regularly plays blues and rock music, occasionally performing with bands at charity events and private gatherings.

== Early life and education ==
Holt was born on March 8, 1959, on Hamilton Air Force Base, Marin County, California, the youngest child of four of June (née DeRozario) and Lester Don Holt. His maternal grandparents were born in Jamaica. Holt's maternal grandfather Canute DeRozario was of Anglo-Indian descent from Spanish Town, and was one of 14 children born to an Eurasian father from Calcutta, India and an English-born White Jamaican mother. His maternal grandmother, May, was an Afro-Jamaican born in Manchester Parish, Jamaica, but raised in Harlem, New York, where his mother was born. His father was African American from Michigan, with roots in Tennessee.

His father was stationed at Elmendorf Air Force Base in Alaska for four years during the Vietnam War. Holt was introduced to broadcasting by his older brother, a disc jockey at a local radio station in Anchorage, Alaska.

He graduated from Cordova High School in Rancho Cordova in 1977 and majored in government at California State University, Sacramento, though he never graduated, receiving an honorary degree in 2015. He has also received honorary Doctorates in Humane Letters from both Rutgers University in 2020 and Villanova University in 2023. In 2012, Holt told American Profile news magazine: "My first on-air job was actually as a disc jockey at a Country and Western station. The only time I could land a full-time gig was if I was willing to report the news." Holt would keep the job with the radio station through his college years.

== Career ==
Holt spent 19 years with CBS, as a reporter, anchor, and international correspondent.

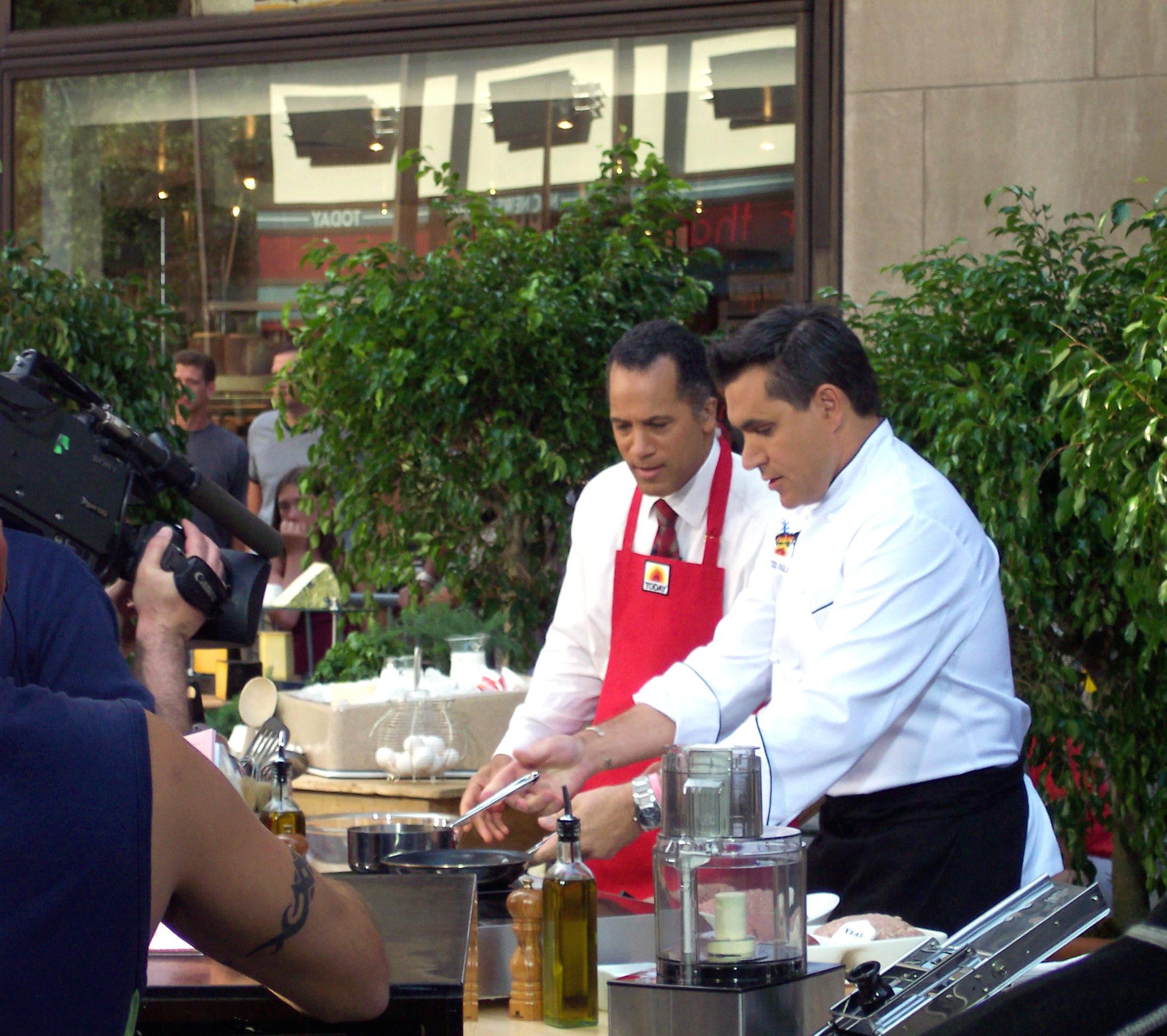
Holt (left) hosting Weekend Today in 2005, cooking live on the streets of New York City

In 1981, he was hired as a reporter for WCBS-TV in New York City. In 1982, he became a reporter and weekend anchor on KNXT in Los Angeles, and the next year he returned to WCBS-TV as a reporter and weekend anchor. In 1986, Holt moved to WBBM-TV in Chicago, where he spent 14 years anchoring the evening news. Holt not only worked at the anchor desk but also reported extensively from troubled spots around the world, including Iraq, Northern Ireland, Somalia, El Salvador and Haiti.

Holt joined MSNBC in 2000. In 2003, he assumed full-time duties at NBC News, where he became a substitute anchor for NBC Nightly News and Today. Holt became a full-time co-anchor of Weekend Today following the death of previous co-anchor David Bloom. Until late 2005, he also anchored a two-hour daily newscast on MSNBC. On May 9, 2007, Holt was named anchor of the weekend edition of NBC Nightly News, anchoring the show for eight years before replacing Brian Williams as permanent anchor of the weekday edition. Additionally, Holt is the current host for NBC's Dateline. He moderated a presidential debate in 2016, and interviewed President Donald Trump in 2017, where fellow journalists said that he asked tough but appropriate questions.

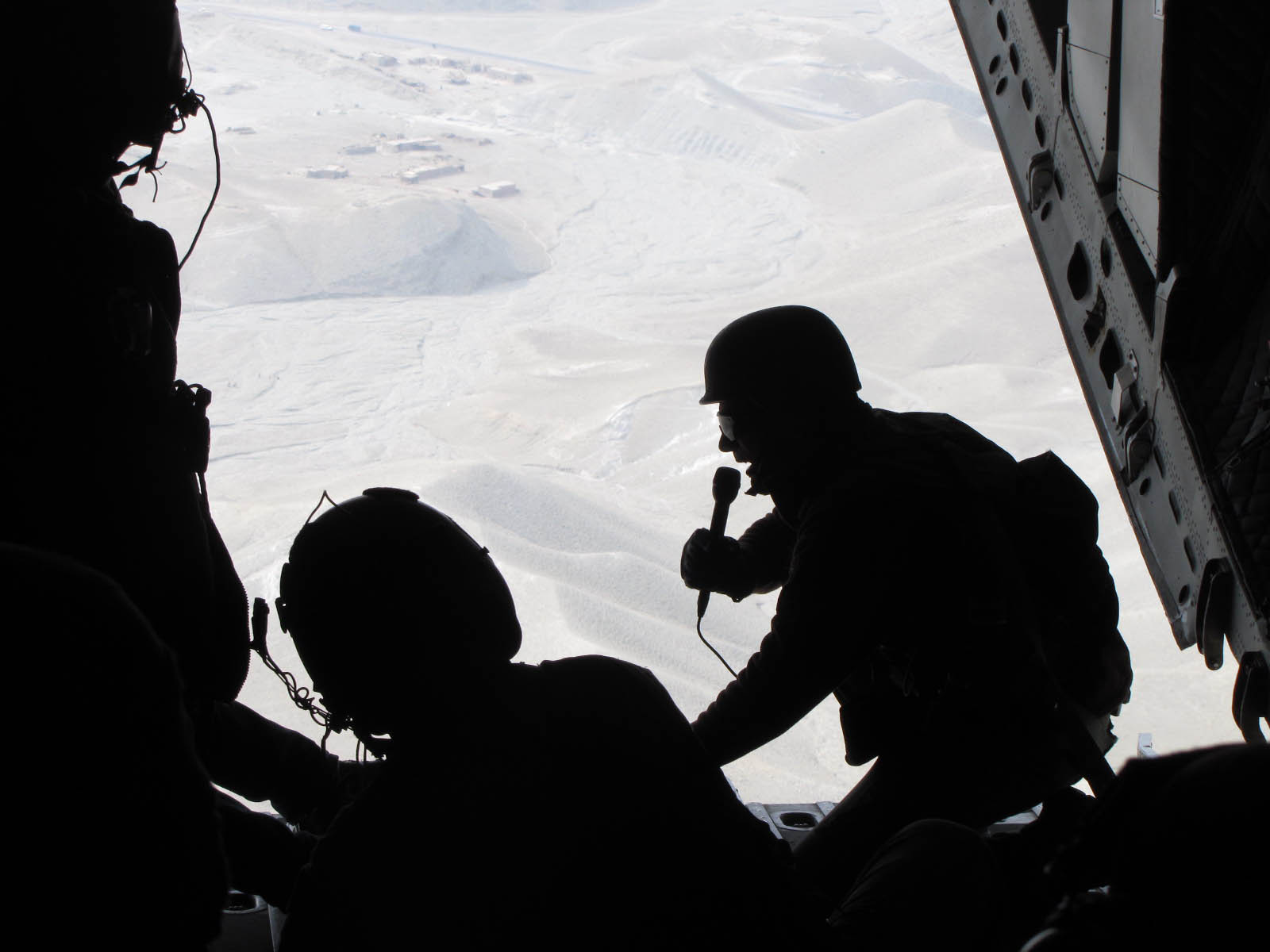
Holt in 2010 photographed by the United States Air Force while reporting on an airdrop mission in Afghanistan

In addition to his primary responsibilities at NBC News, he hosted a special for The History Channel about the 9/11 conspiracy theories, served as a sportsdesk reporter for NBC Sports coverage of the 2008 Summer Olympics, and is the host of Dateline on ID, an edition of Dateline NBC shown on the Investigation Discovery network. In 2008, he narrated a documentary regarding actual crystal skulls on the Sci-Fi Channel.

When Brian Williams took medical leave in 2013 for knee replacement surgery, Holt filled in as weekday anchor. In 2015, Williams was suspended for reportedly exaggerating a story about the Iraq War, and Holt permanently replaced him as NBC Nightly News anchor.

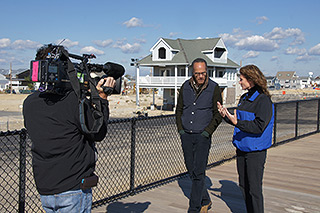
Holt interviewing Dr. Holly Bamford of the National Ocean Service and National Oceanic and Atmospheric Administration in 2013

Holt moderated the Democratic presidential candidates' debate in January 2016, alongside a panel of NBC political reporters, as well as the first presidential debate on September 26, 2016. Prior to the debate, presidential candidate Donald Trump said that this was "a very unfair system" because "Lester is a Democrat" (Holt was at the time a registered Republican. He changed his party affiliation to independent in 2018). Afterward, Donald Trump said that Holt did "a good job". Journalists also said that Holt performed admirably; for example he challenged Trump when Trump said that he originally opposed the war in Iraq, which was proven to be a false statement. The Washington Post said "Kudos to Holt" for making it clear that stop and frisk was ruled unconstitutional in New York, when Trump said it wasn't.

In May 2017, when Holt interviewed President Trump, they discussed Trump's firing of FBI director James Comey. Holt's interview with Trump resulted in extensive media coverage.

In 2020, Holt extensively covered the COVID-19 pandemic and saw a spike in ratings alongside the other evening news shows. He also sometimes ended his shows with monologues, reflecting on the pandemic and its impact. He also ended his show with a monologue after the January 6 Capitol Attack, criticizing Trump and the culture of disinformation that led to the attack. In 2022, Holt announced the death of Queen Elizabeth II in an NBC News Special Report, and in 2023, he interviewed Ebrahim Raisi, president of Iran. In October 2023, Holt traveled to Israel to cover the 2023 Hamas attack on Israel, and the ongoing Gaza war On November 8, 2023, he co-moderated the third GOP Primary Debate, alongside Hugh Hewitt and Kristen Welker. The debate drew 7.5 million viewers. Since 2020, Holt has signed off by saying "I'm Lester Holt; please take care of yourself, and each other. Good night."

In May 2025, Holt stepped down as the host of NBC Nightly News, taking up the position of a host on Dateline NBC. In his last show, he said, "Please take care of yourself, and each other, and I'll do the same."

=== Other work ===
Holt has made cameo appearances in the 1993 film The Fugitive, its 1998 sequel U.S. Marshals, and Primal Fear (1996), as well as on television shows, playing himself in episodes of Law & Order: Special Victims Unit; the episode "Red, White, or Blue" of the series Due South; "Fate" of Early Edition and "A New Hope" of Warehouse 13. He appeared on the episode "Cleveland" of the NBC sitcom 30 Rock. He also did a voice-over in the episode "Sandwich Day," announcing that Jack Donaghy would be a new cabinet member in the Bush administration. Holt announced the 2006, 2007, and 2008 Westminster Kennel Club Dog Show for the USA Network, and was featured in Making Music magazine. He also hosted the 2008 Sci-Fi Channel documentary Mystery of the Crystal Skulls. On May 31, 2020, Holt delivered a virtual commencement speech for the 254th graduating class of Rutgers University due to the COVID-19 pandemic.

== Career timeline ==
- 1981–2000: CBS owned and operated stations
  - 1981–1982: WCBS-TV reporter
  - 1982–1983: KNXT weekend anchor and reporter
  - 1983–1986: WCBS-TV anchor
  - 1986–2000: WBBM-TV anchor and reporter
- 2000–present: NBC News
  - 2000–2003: NBC News / MSNBC correspondent
  - 2003–2015: Weekend Today co-anchor
  - 2003–present: Today fill-in anchor
  - 2007–2015: NBC Nightly News Weekend anchor
  - 2009–2015: Why Planes Crash voiceover
  - 2011–present: Dateline NBC anchor
  - August 6, 2013 – September 2, 2013 and February 9, 2015 – June 18, 2015: NBC Nightly News interim anchor
  - June 22, 2015 – May 30, 2025: NBC Nightly News anchor/managing editor (added managing editor in April 2021)

== Awards and honors ==
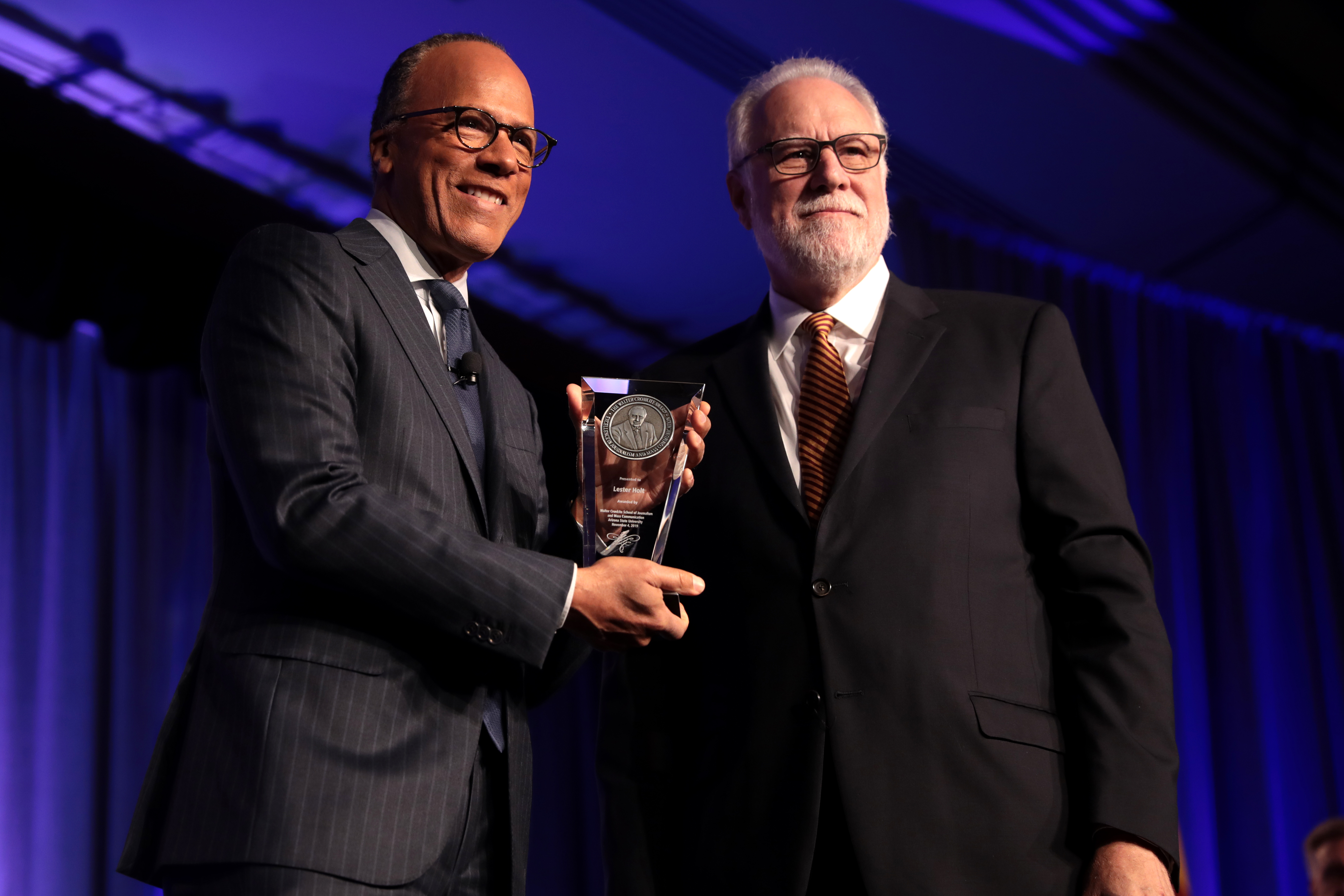
Holt receiving the Walter Cronkite Award for Excellence in Journalism

- 1990: Robert F. Kennedy Journalism Award for his work on CBS's 48 Hours: No Place Like Home
- 2012: Honorary Doctorate from Pepperdine University
- 2015: Honorary Doctorate from California State University, Sacramento
- 2015: Inducted into the California Hall of Fame on October 28, 2015
- 2016: Alan B. DuMont Broadcaster of the Year from Montclair State University
- 2016: NABJ Journalist of the Year Award from the National Association of Black Journalists
- 2017: DePaul University Center for Journalism's Distinguished Journalist Award
- 2018: Poynter Medal for Lifetime Achievement in Journalism
- 2019: Walter Cronkite Award for Excellence in Journalism
- 2020: Honorary Doctorate from Rutgers University
- 2023: Larry Foster Award for Integrity in Public Communication from the Arthur W. Page Center for Integrity in Public Communication
- 2023: Honorary Doctorate from Villanova University

== Personal life ==
Holt resides in Manhattan with his wife, Carol Hagen; they have two sons, Stefan and Cameron. Stefan Holt graduated in 2009 from Pepperdine University and was the morning news anchor at NBC-owned WMAQ-TV in Chicago. In 2016, Stefan moved to the same floor as his father's Nightly News when joining WNBC, and he eventually succeeded veteran Chuck Scarborough as anchor of the station's 11 p.m. news broadcast. Stefan currently is the 5:00, 6:00, and 10:00 pm anchor at WMAQ.

Lester Holt plays bass guitar and the upright bass and performs in the band Rough Cuts composed mostly of video editors from Dateline NBC.

Holt attends the Manhattan Church of Christ in New York.

== See also ==
- New Yorkers in journalism

Media offices
Preceded by David Bloom	Weekend Today Co-Anchor; 2003–2015	Succeeded by Craig Melvin
Preceded by John Seigenthaler	NBC Nightly News Weekend Edition Anchor; 2007–2015	Succeeded by Kate Snow
Preceded by Brian Williams	NBC Nightly News Weekday Edition Anchor; 2015–2025	Succeeded by Tom Llamas
Preceded by Ann Curry	Dateline NBC Anchor; 2011–present	Incumbent
