= Renee Ferguson =

American journalist (1949–2025)

Renee Ferguson (August 22, 1949 – June 6, 2025) was an American news reporter and long-time journalist for WMAQ. She was the first African-American woman to work as an investigative reporter in Chicago. She won a Nieman Fellowship at Harvard, and an Alfred I. duPont–Columbia Award.

== Life and career ==
Ferguson was born on August 22, 1949 in Oklahoma City, and graduated from the Indiana University-Bloomington in 1971. Throughout her career she worked with several networks, including CBS News in Atlanta, CBS2 in Chicago and NBC5.

She co-founded the Chicago chapter of the National Association of Black Journalists.

During the 2020 Presidential election, she publicly endorsed Pete Buttigieg and his campaign.
