= Stefan Holt =

American journalist and television news anchor (born 1980s)

- Born: c. 1986 or 1987 (age 39–40); Chicago, Illinois, U.S.
- Education: Pepperdine University
- Occupation: Journalist
- Employer: WMAQ-TV
- Spouse: Morgan Holt (m. 2012)
- Children: 3
- Father: Lester Holt

Stefan Holt (born c. 1986/1987) is an American journalist and television news anchor for WMAQ-TV—the Chicago owned-and-operated station of NBC. He anchors alongside Allison Rosati for the 5 p.m., 6 p.m. and 10 p.m. news programs on this station, after he replaced Rob Stafford who retired on December 23, 2022.

== Early life ==
Holt was born in Chicago, Illinois. His father, Lester Holt, was the main anchor for WBBM-TV in that city. His mother, Carol Hagen, had worked as a flight attendant.

Holt is a 2009 graduate of Pepperdine University in Malibu, California. During his college years, he interned at KABC-TV in Los Angeles and NBC News in London.

== Career ==
Holt began his career at WPBF, the ABC-TV affiliate in West Palm Beach, Florida, as a reporter and anchor.

In 2011, Holt moved to NBC's Chicago television station WMAQ as a reporter and anchor. Eight months later, he was named weekday news anchor for the 4:30 a.m. – 7 a.m. newscast.

Holt was named anchor of the 4 p.m. newscast on WNBC-TV in New York City in 2016. In 2017, Holt added duties as anchor of WNBC's 11 p.m. news. He took over from long-time anchor Chuck Scarborough.

On August 19, 2020, Holt announced on Twitter that he would be returning to WMAQ in Chicago after four years at WNBC. He is the 4 p.m. and 10 p.m. anchor. He made his debut on October 12. David Ushery replaced Holt on WNBC's newscasts. His last day at WNBC was September 25, 2020.

== Personal life ==
Holt met his wife, Morgan, while both were attending Pepperdine University. They married at the college in 2012. In 2017, the couple announced the birth of their son, Henry, in New York City.

Holt's father, Lester Holt, is the anchor of Dateline NBC. His mother, Carol Hagen-Holt, is a New York City real estate agent.
