= David Ushery =

American TV news anchor

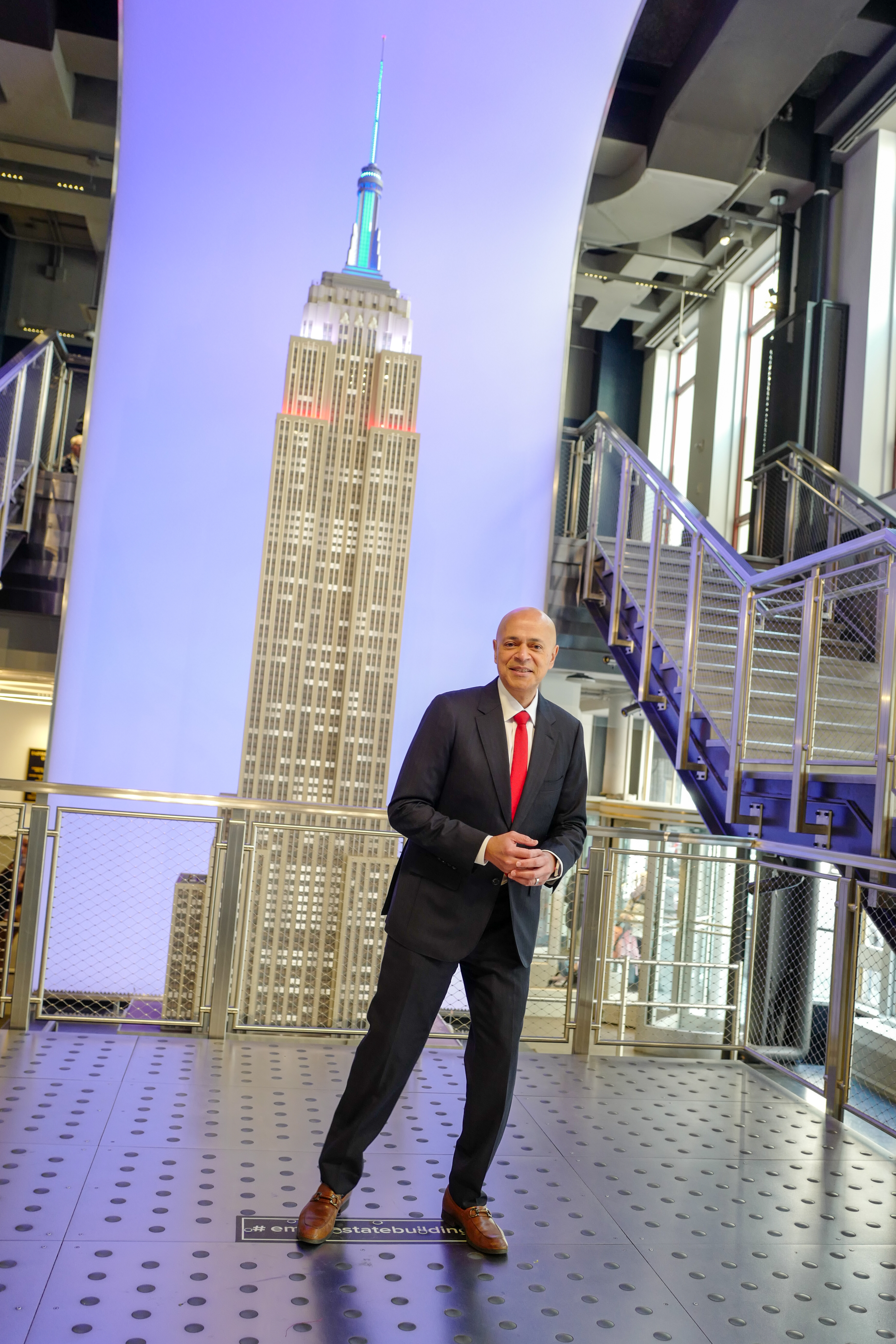
- Ushery at Empire State Building in NYC May 2026
- Born: June 5, 1967 (age 59); Bloomfield, Connecticut, US
- Education: University of Connecticut
- Occupation: Anchor/Reporter
- Notable credit: News Anchor (WNBC)
- Spouse: Isabel Rivera
- Children: one son

David Ushery (born June 5, 1967) is an American television news anchor at WNBC News 4 New York, NBC's flagship owned and operated station.

As a member of the NBC 4 New York News team, Ushery has covered many news stories across the Tri-State region and around the world, including the terror attacks in Manchester, England; Orlando, Florida; and Paris, France.

== Early life ==
Ushery was born and raised in Bloomfield, Connecticut, the only child of Solomon and Winifred Ushery.

At age 11, Ushery was selected from a statewide search to host the local edition of "Kidsworld," a nationally syndicated television show. One of his early interviews was with the late Walter Cronkite, the former CBS News anchor once ranked as the most trusted man in America. In what could be considered a prescient scene from that interview, young Ushery sits at the anchor desk. He asked Cronkite, "What kind of person should be a newscaster?" Cronkite responded that a person should have a sense of curiosity. Ushery has said of the interview: "Many have asked if I think that's when the seed was planted for me to become a television reporter and anchor. I say, YES." Connecticut audiences would see Ushery grow up on television. He hosted Kidsworld until he was 18.

Ushery graduated from the University of Connecticut with a double major in political science and journalism. While at the university he was a staff writer for the Hartford Courant newspaper, where he honed his skills for covering local politics and events. He also reported for the Los Angeles Times. The CBS affiliate in Hartford, WFSB-TV, hired Ushery right after his graduation for its training program. But recognizing his talent, the station offered him a full-time general assignment reporting position within just a matter of months.

== Career ==
As the lead reporter for WFSB's 11 pm broadcast, Ushery covered many stories impacting the everyday lives of the citizens of Connecticut's capital city. But one of these stories made an indelible impression on Ushery: the night he and his photographer spent with residents of New Britain who were being terrorized by arsonists. Within two years of starting at the station, Ushery traveled to Moscow after the fall of the Soviet Union for a story on policing. The overseas trip would become the first of many in Ushery's career, as news directors recognized his talent for covering international stories.

In 1993, at the age of 25, Ushery was recruited by WABC-TV in New York City to join its staff as a general assignment reporter, covering news for the number one station in the top market in the nation.

He was part of the station's coverage of the police investigations into the shooting death of Amadou Diallo and the torture of Abner Louima, the deaths of Jacqueline Kennedy Onassis and John F. Kennedy Jr. and September 11 terrorist attacks. He was on the team of reporters for WABC's extended coverage of the celebrations for the Yankees World Series wins and the installation of Edward Cardinal Egan to lead New York City's Archdiocese.

WABC also sent Ushery on the road to cover world events including multiple reports from Haiti on the island's political unrest, Pope John Paul II's visits to Africa and Toronto, and the United Nations' conference on racism in South Africa.

Three years after arriving at WABC, Ushery was named anchor of a new weekend show, "Eyewitness News This Morning." He also anchored the weekday morning newscasts and the news at noon. Ushery was later named primary fill-in for the legendary anchor, the late Bill Beutel. Ushery spent 10 years at WABC.

In 2003, he joined WNBC-TV to become the anchor of its highly rated morning newscast, "Weekend Today in New York." The show's format of hard news and features, interviews and sports, allowed Ushery to display his versatility as a newsman. One year later, Ushery was also named anchor of WNBC's weekend 6 pm and 11 pm newscasts. These simultaneous appointments made Ushery in effect "the face" of WNBC during the weekend, anchoring all the station's morning and evening newscasts on Saturday and Sunday. In 2006, Ushery was named co-anchor of WNBC's iconic "Live at 5" program, alongside legendary anchor Sue Simmons. After a change of programming, Ushery returned to anchor the weekend broadcasts for "News 4 New York."

As an anchor at WNBC, he has steered coverage of some of the most memorable events in recent memory. In 2018, Ushery traveled to Houston, Texas to deliver live updates following the funeral of former President George H.W. Bush. Earlier that year, Ushery traveled to Jerusalem where he took Tri-State viewers to the opening of the new United States Embassy. He also took viewers to the front lines in Gaza and the West Bank, where massive protests led to confrontations with police. One year earlier, Ushery traveled to Israel to cover President Trump's visit to the Holy Land before quickly shifting his live reports to England, following the tragic bombing outside the Manchester sports arena.

In June 2016, Ushery traveled to Orlando to cover the tragic Pulse Nightclub shooting. One year prior, he reported from Paris following the city's deadly terrorist attacks. He also provided live coverage following the Sandy Hook elementary school shooting in 2012, the miraculous emergency landing of US Airways Flight 1549 in the Hudson River in 2009 as well as multiple presidential elections. He made also made several trips to Rome to cover the resignation of Pope Benedict XVI; the 2013 papal conclave electing Pope Francis, the current Pope of the Catholic Church and the canonizations of Popes John Paul II and John XXIII.

Ushery has also represented NBC Universal in national initiatives. He hosted the network's special program on its switch to digital in 2009, as well as "Going Green at Any Age," which examined ways to help the environment.

In 2009, Ushery conceived and launched "The Debrief with David Ushery," which has been called a must-watch program that was nominated for a 2011 Emmy Award. The weekly, half-hour broadcast gives viewers a unique perspective on important current events. According to the show's opening lines, "Eight million stories in the naked city. And chances are you can only keep up with a fraction of them during your hectic day. Give us just a few minutes then to bring you up to speed on What New Yorkers are talking about."

Ushery takes a high-energy, unscripted approach for his interviews with reporters and newsmakers. Viewers are meant to feel part of the conversation about major stories. The show has garnered attention and praise for breaking boundaries and challenging long-held tenets of being an anchor. In "The Debrief," Ushery doesn't sit behind an anchor desk but rather moves freely around the News 4 newsroom, giving viewers a behind-the-scenes look at the operation. He also often goes tie-less, an informal look he sometimes wears when he anchors the more traditional evening newscasts. Ushery was noted for boldly venturing into uncharted territory for not wearing a tie.

The no tie-look also caught the attention of other media, including the New York Times and NBC "Nightly News" Anchor Brian Williams, who during a holiday television appearance with Ushery joked that viewers should consider giving Ushery a necktie. Even then-New York City Mayor Michael Bloomberg, at the annual Gracie Mansion holiday party for the press, called Ushery to the podium saying he "was really excited by 'The Debrief,' your new show about New York." The Mayor also remarked that Ushery seemed a "little underdressed." Bloomberg whipped off his own tie and presented it to Ushery as a gift.

In 2010, after a "Debrief" segment featuring blogging New York City mothers, Ushery developed and launched a spin-off program. "Moms and the City and a Dad named David," features Ushery and three mothers offering a straightforward look at life in the city from a parent's point of view. Ushery has said the fourth mother on the program is New York City. The program airs on WNBC's New York Nonstop cable channel.

NBCUniversal announced Ushery as the anchor of WNBC's 4 and 11 pm newscasts beginning in October 2020, as incumbent Stefan Holt returns to the company's Chicago station.

== Awards and honors ==
During his long career in New York City, Ushery has been recognized for his contributions to the community. In 1993, he won an award from the National Association of Black Journalists for his series of reports on children and violence. In 1999, The Network Journal, the Black Professionals and Small Business Magazine, named Ushery as one of its "40 Under-Forty" for his significant accomplishments. In 2000, the Israeli Consulate in New York City honored Ushery for his dedicated reporting. And in 2010, Ushery was honored as a recipient of McDonald's Faces of Black History Award.

== Personal life ==
Ushery is married to TV producer Isabel Rivera. The couple has one son. The family is Catholic.
