= Ken Rosato =

American television journalist

- Born: May 4, 1967; New Rochelle, New York, US
- Education: New York University
- Occupation: Journalist
- Notable credit: Morning anchor for WABC-TV (2007–2023)
- Awards: Emmy Award

Ken Rosato is an American journalist who served as the morning anchor for WABC-TV in New York City from 2007 until 2023.

== Early life and education ==
Rosato graduated from Regis High School in New York City. He then pursued a bachelor's degree in Film, TV, and Radio at New York University. Following his undergraduate studies, Rosato obtained a master's degree in Spanish and Italian.

== Career ==
Before his tenure at WABC-TV, Rosato worked as an anchor and reporter at WNYW in New York City from 2002 to 2003. He also spent time in Miami/Fort Lauderdale, Florida, as an anchor at WFOR-TV from 1998 to 2002. Additionally, Rosato worked as an anchor for 1010 WINS radio in New York City. He held the positions of news director and main anchor at WLNY-TV (now owned by CBS), and WBLI Long Island (where he was known as "Ken Rhodes"). He was also a program director and disc jockey at WVIP Mount Kisco, New York.

=== WABC-TV ===
Rosato joined WABC-TV in 2003 as a freelance reporter. On July 6, 2007, it was announced that Rosato would be joining Lori Stokes and Bill Evans as a co-anchor on Eyewitness News This Morning and Eyewitness News at Noon. Rosato replaced reporter Steve Bartelstein, who had been fired a few months earlier.

Rosato received an Emmy Award for his reporting on a steam pipe explosion in New York City on July 19, 2007.

In April 2010, Rosato announced that he underwent surgery to remove a non-functioning kidney.

In May 2023, Rosato was dismissed from WABC. According to reports, he made an offensive comment while with a co-worker.

== See also ==
- New Yorkers in journalism
