= Rob Stafford =

American television anchor (born 1958)

Robert R. Stafford
- Born: 15 December 1958 (age 67); New Hampshire, U.S.
- Occupations: WMAQ anchor, Dateline correspondent
- Spouse: Lisa
- Children: Addy

Rob Stafford (born December 15, 1958) is a retired Chicago television anchor and a former correspondent for NBC's Dateline NBC newsmagazine.

== Early life and education ==
A native of New Hampshire, Robert R. Stafford earned a degree in political science and journalism at Macalester College in St. Paul, Minnesota in 1981.

== Professional career ==
Stafford began his career as a reporter and anchor for KBJR-TV in Duluth, Minnesota and WFRV-TV in Green Bay, Wisconsin. He then became a morning news anchor and an investigative reporter at WFTV-TV in Orlando, Florida. While at WFTV, Stafford founded the station's investigative unit and launched a two-year investigation into hotel security in Orlando, which because of Disney World is a popular tourist destination. Stafford's work exposed significant security breaches for tourists and ultimately resulted in a grand jury investigation.

In September 1992, Stafford joined WBBM-TV in Chicago as a general assignment reporter. During his four years at the station, he also worked as a fill-in anchor.

Stafford left WBBM in 1996 to join NBC's Dateline NBC newsmagazine show, where he worked as a Chicago-based correspondent for the newsmagazine program for almost 11 years. He was removed from Dateline NBC in 2006 in a cost-cutting move.

On September 23, 2007, Stafford joined WMAQ-TV/NBC5 Chicago as a weekend anchor and general assignment reporter. "I wanted this job and asked for it," Stafford told the Chicago Sun-Times after being hired by WMAQ.

He moved to the main anchor position in July 2009 and anchored the station's 5 p.m., 6 p.m., and 10 p.m. newscasts. He retired on December 23, 2022.

== Awards ==
While at Dateline, Stafford won two national news Emmy awards. He also won the Edward R. Murrow award in 2000 for his Dateline investigation into racial profiling.

== Personal ==
Stafford and his wife, Lisa and their daughter Addy, who is an actress, live in Hinsdale, Illinois.

Stafford was diagnosed with a rare blood disorder, amyloidosis in 2017. His doctors diagnosed it early, and Stafford will undergo a bone marrow transplant and chemotherapy. He credits his wife, Lisa, for encouraging him to undergo further tests after a routine physical revealed slightly elevated protein levels.

== Lawsuits ==
In August 2019, Stafford was recently sued against the sterilization solution company Sterigenics while during his amyloidosis diagnosis that he was exposed to toxic levels of ethylene oxide from the company's west suburban Willowbrook facility plant. At that time, Stafford lived in Hinsdale and belonged to a sports club in Burr Ridge, the company's sterilization process was found to have resulted in ethylene oxide emission, causing exposure in portions of Burr Ridge and Hinsdale. His lawsuit against the company seeks more than $50,000 in damages. A spokesperson of WMAQ-TV said that he has not been assigned to report on, or read, any stories involving Sterigenics.
