= Nancy Loo =

American journalist

- Born: June 23, 1964 (age 62); British Hong Kong
- Education: University of Oregon School of Journalism and Communication
- Occupation: Journalist
- Children: 2

Nancy Loo is the West Coast Bureau Correspondent for NewsNation in Los Angeles.

== Early life ==
In 1964, Loo was born in Hong Kong. Loo was raised in Northern California, U.S.

== Career ==
Loo landed her first broadcasting job out of the University of Oregon School of Journalism with TVB Pearl, an English-language channel in Hong Kong. Loo served as an anchor and also traveled extensively to cover news in the Philippines, Taiwan and Thailand. She later became a freelance reporter for ABC Radio, reporting on major news events in South Korea, North Korea and Japan. She also anchored an English-language newscast on Japan Cable TV before moving to New York City in 1989. Loo served as a freelance television reporter for News 12 Long Island in 1989 and 1990. She then spent two years away from television raising her first child.

In 1992, she became one of the original "video journalists" on NY1 (New York One), the all-news cable channel for New York City owned by Time Warner. As a VJ, Loo covered the health beat, serving as a videographer and shooting her own stand-ups in front of the camera. She was also a fill-in anchor and won the Women in Cable National Anchor of the Year Award for her performance anchoring non-stop from 4:00 p.m. to 1:15 a.m. on the day of the World Trade Center bombing in 1993. The blast knocked out the rooftop antennas that broadcast signals for other television stations in New York City, so NY1 was the only local TV news outlet to remain "on the air" that day.

WABC-TV, the flagship for the ABC station group, hired Loo in 1994 as a general assignment reporter and later created an on-set daily health news segment for her on the early morning newscast. She spent a week in London in early 1996 shooting medical reports. A few months later, the station promoted her to co-anchor the morning and midday newscasts. In March 1997, she experienced labor pains during a morning newscast, but finished the show before driving herself to a hospital in Westchester County where she delivered her second child. The newscast won the Emmy for best morning newscast in New York that year.

Loo moved to Chicago in 2001 to become co-anchor of the early morning newscast on WFLD-TV, a Fox-owned station. The station later added co-anchor of the midday newscast to her duties. In 2010, Loo left WFLD channel 32.

On June 1, 2010, Loo joined WGN-TV in Chicago, Illinois as a primary reporter on the morning and midday newscasts. She also fills in as an anchor on the morning, midday and weekend newscasts. She also frequently reports special segments for the afternoon and evening newscasts.

Social media enthusiasts consider Loo a pioneer among news people in using social media. She posts videos, photos, articles, comments and questions on Facebook, Twitter and other social media to help draw viewers to WGN newscasts. Her blog on WGNTV.com, "Big Tiny World", is one of the site's most popular.

Loo also appears monthly as a guest on the webcast ChicagonistaLIVE!, produced by www.Chicagonista.com and billed as Chicago's first "Social Talk Show", an innovative and interactive program featuring four social media mavens discussing Chicago-centric hot topics and tech news.

Besides English, Loo speaks fluent Cantonese and has studied German, Japanese, and American Sign Language. Loo is active with a number of Asian-American community and business groups in Chicago.

On May 12, 2020, Loo has announced she will be moving to Los Angeles to join WGN America news show NewsNation as the West Coast bureau correspondent, her last day was on May 20, 2020.

== Personal life ==
Loo is married and has two children.
