= Steve Bartelstein =

American journalist

Steve Bartelstein is an American former television journalist. He was previously a news anchor in New York City, first at WABC-TV (1999–2007), a flagship station of the ABC television network, WCBS-TV (2007–2009), a flagship station of CBS and later in Chicago at WBBM-TV (2010–2011), a television station owned and operated by the television network CBS.

== Early life and education ==
Bartelstein was born in Evanston, Illinois, and graduated from Niles East High School, located in Skokie, Illinois. He attended the University of Evansville for two years. He is of Italian and Jewish descent.

== Broadcasting career ==
He began his broadcasting career at age nineteen as a weekend news anchor in Evansville. He worked in Durham, North Carolina; Providence, Rhode Island; Indianapolis, Indiana; Charleston, South Carolina; and Portland, Oregon.

Following a period working at CNN in Atlanta, Georgia, he joined WABC-TV in New York City. Bartelstein was the anchor for WABC when they initially covered the September 11 attacks.

On March 14, 2007, the Daily News reported that Bartelstein had been "fired" from WABC-TV after "sleeping through a newsbreak he was to anchor". The Daily News article also reported that WABC-TV had previously suspended him several times for persistent tardiness.

On November 7, 2007, Mediaweek reported that WCBS-TV had announced that it had hired Bartelstein as a weekend news anchor. The station soon began airing promotional announcements featuring him and making reference to an upcoming feature story about his cancer illness. On September 28, 2007, New York Post columnist Cindy Adams had reported that Bartelstein was being treated for testicular cancer.

On March 18, 2009, WCBS-TV announced that he had left the station. Bartelstein told the Daily News that he was unhappy and felt unappreciated with his job.

On August 12, 2010, it was announced that he would be joining WBBM-TV in Chicago as a morning-news anchor On July 3, 2011, it was announced that he left WBBM after only 10 months, putting an end to his broadcasting career.

== After broadcasting ==
Bartelstein attended baseball umpire school and umpired in the Pecos League for the 2013 and 2014 seasons.
