= WMAQ-TV =

Television station in Chicago

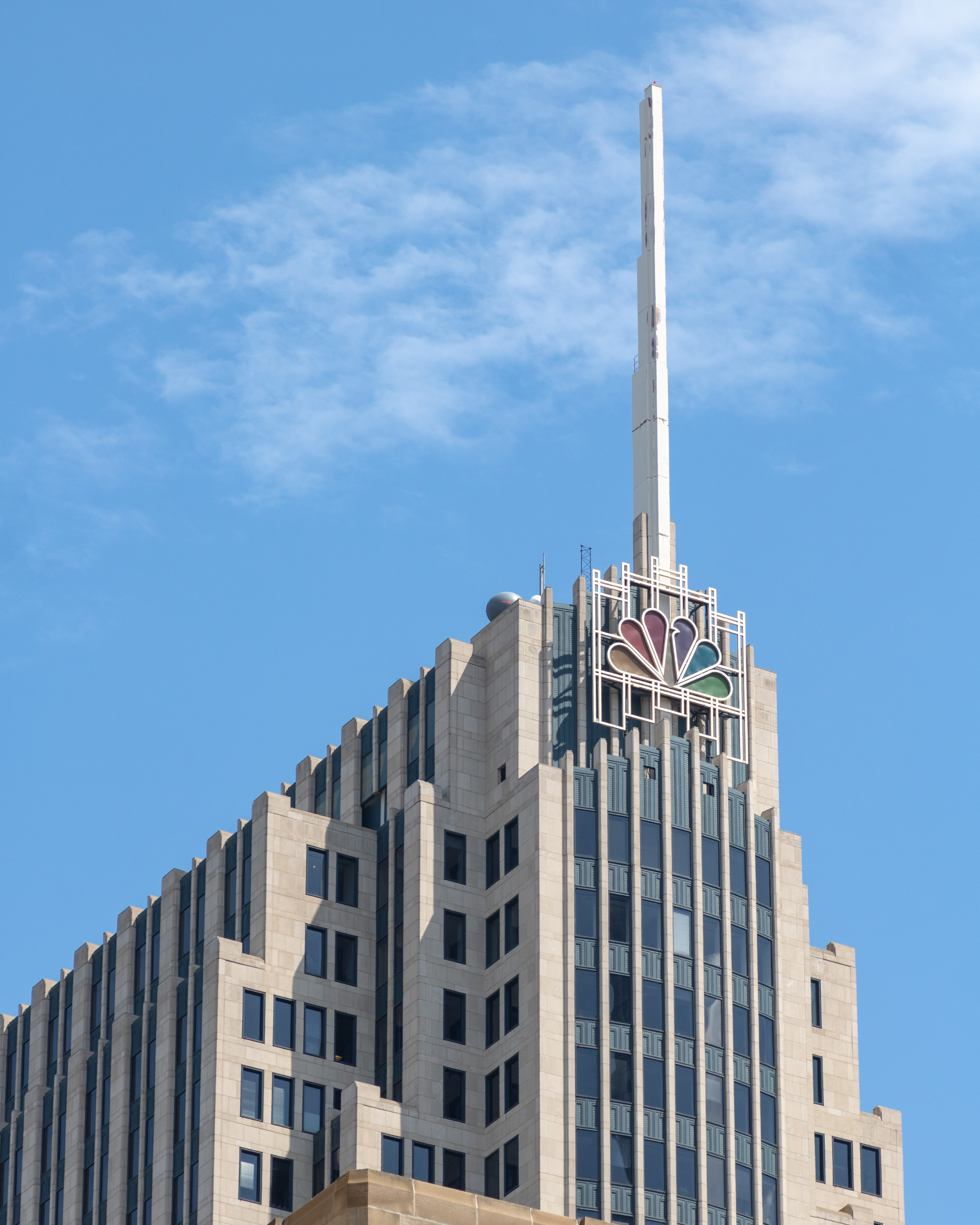
- The NBC Tower on North Columbus Drive, home to WMAQ-TV since 1989.
- Chicago, Illinois; United States
- Channels: Digital: 33 (UHF), shared with WSNS-TV; Virtual: 5
- Branding: NBC 5 Chicago

Programming
- Affiliations: 5.1: NBC; for others, see § Technical information and subchannels

Ownership
- Owner: NBC Owned Television Stations; (NBC Telemundo License LLC)
- Sister stations: WSNS-TV

History
- First air date: October 8, 1948
- Former call signs: WNTC (1946); WNBY (1946–1948); WNBQ (1948–1964)
- Former channel numbers: Analog: 5 (VHF, 1948–2009); Digital: 29 (UHF, until 2019)
- Call sign meaning: "We Must Ask Questions"

Technical information
- Licensing authority: FCC
- Facility ID: 47905
- ERP: 398 kW
- HAAT: 509 m (1,670 ft)
- Transmitter coordinates: 41°52′44.1″N 87°38′10.2″W

Links
- Public license information: Public file; LMS
- Website: www.nbcchicago.com

WMAQ-TV (channel 5) is a television station in Chicago, Illinois, United States. It is owned and operated by the NBC television network via its NBC Owned Television Stations division. Under common ownership with Telemundo station WSNS-TV (channel 44), the two stations share studio facilities at the NBC Tower on North Columbus Drive in the city's Streeterville neighborhood and broadcast from the same transmitter atop the Willis Tower in the Chicago Loop.

== History ==
=== Early years (1948–1964) ===
The station first signed on the air on October 8, 1948, as WNBQ; it was the fourth television station to sign on in Chicago. It was also the third of NBC's five original owned-and-operated television stations to begin operations, after WNBC-TV in New York City and WRC-TV in Washington, D.C., and before WKYC in Cleveland and KNBC in Los Angeles. WNBQ initially broadcast a minimum of two hours of programming per day.

The station originally proposed WNBY as its call letters. However, at NBC's request, the Federal Communications Commission (FCC) approved an application filed by the network to change the station's calls to WNBQ. This move was announced on March 3, 1948.

NBC officials cited the need to avoid possible confusion with WMBI (1110 AM, now WXES) and to obtain a callsign that was closer to co-owned NBC Radio Network stations WMAQ (670 AM, now WSCR) and WMAQ-FM (101.1, now WKQX) as the reasons for the change.

The station's first mid-week broadcast occurred the month following its sign-on when Paul Winchell and Joseph Dunninger were featured on the NBC variety series, The Floor Show. The half-hour program was recorded via kinescope and rebroadcast on WNBQ at 8:30 p.m. on Thursdays.

WNBQ originated several programs for the NBC television network from its original studio facilities—a 170,000-square-foot (15,794 m^{2}) studio on the 19th floor of the Merchandise Mart on the city's Near North Side—during the 1950s, including Kukla, Fran and Ollie, featuring Burr Tillstrom and Fran Allison; Garroway at Large, starring Dave Garroway; and Studs' Place, hosted by Studs Terkel. Television critics referred to the broadcasts—often low-budget with few celebrity guests but a good deal of inventiveness—as examples of the "Chicago School of Television".

On April 15, 1956, WNBQ became the first television station to broadcast in color.

=== Rebirth as WMAQ-TV (1964–1995) ===
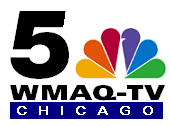
WMAQ-TV logo, used from 1992 to 1995. The '5' in this logo, set in Helvetica, was also used from 1976 to 1985.

Although NBC had long owned the WMAQ radio stations, the television station continued to maintain a callsign separate from those used by its co-owned radio outlets; this changed on August 31, 1964, when the network changed the station's calls to WMAQ-TV.

The call letters of its sister radio station were initially assigned by the government but were creatively used to form the phrase "We Must Ask Questions", which the radio station took as its motto in the 1920s. Although the station's role as a program provider to NBC diminished in the 1960s, WMAQ-TV gathered and distributed more than 200 news footage feeds per month from overseas and the Central United States to NBC News.

On December 3, 1985, NBC signed a $100 million+ agreement to lease office space in a three-story annex to the north of a planned 34-story, 1,000,000-square-foot (93,000 m^{2}) skyscraper—a project developed by the Equitable Life Assurance Society and Tishman-Speyer Properties—that would be constructed as part of the Cityfront Center development on the northwest corner of Columbus Drive and North Water Street, in which WMAQ-TV's operations would occupy 251,000 square feet (23,000 m^{2}) of the building. Under the plans for the project, NBC was given the option of acquiring an approximately 25% interest in the building. On October 1, 1989, after 40 years at the Merchandise Mart, the station officially relocated its operations and began broadcasting from the NBC Tower, located on 455 North Columbus Drive, six blocks east of the Mart.

The Jenny Jones Show was taped at WMAQ-TV's Studio A from 1991 to 2003.

In the spring of 1992, the NBC-owned television stations, including WMAQ-TV, announced that they would no longer air paid programming. The last local infomercial aired on the station was a local weekly real estate show aired in 1992. Paid programming has since returned in a much more reduced capacity, but as an NBC O&O with a fully-filled schedule otherwise on weekdays, is usually limited to overnights on weekends and occasional Sunday mornings.

=== 1995–present ===
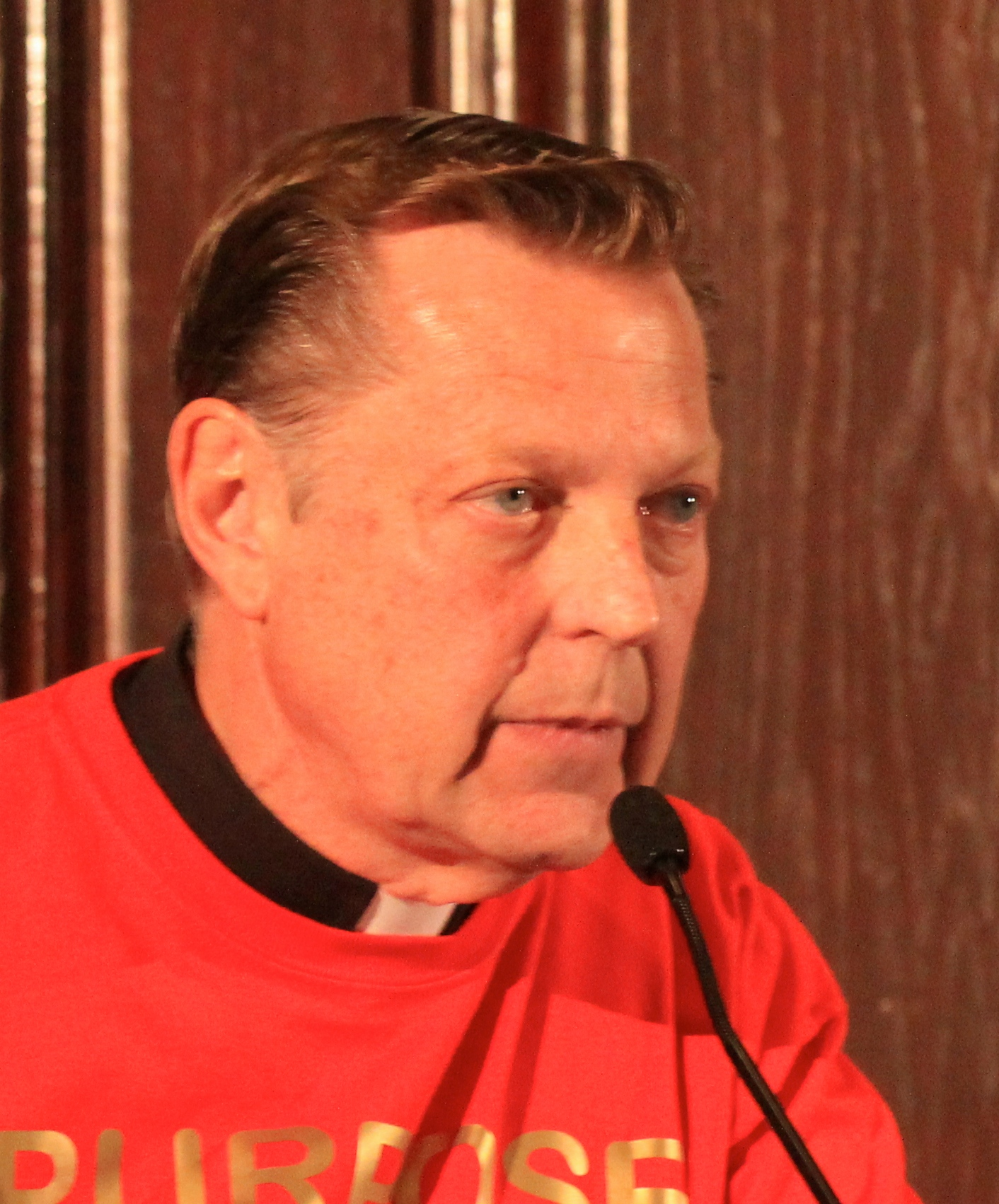
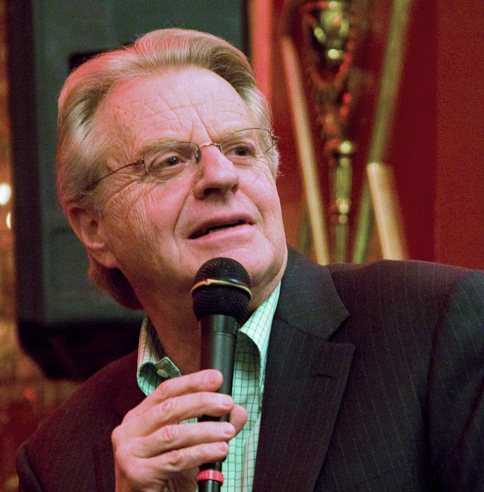
Rev. Michael Pfleger successfully requested that WMAQ-TV cancel its broadcasts of The Jerry Springer Show.

On April 10, 1998, Rev. Michael Pfleger, a priest at St. Sabina Church in Auburn Gresham and a group of Christian, Muslim, and Jewish leaders and clergy as part of the "Dump Jerry Springer!" coalition, called for a viewer and advertiser boycott of WMAQ-TV due to one of its syndicated shows, The Jerry Springer Show, which was filmed at the station's NBC Tower studios until 2009. On April 23, 1998, Pfleger and the coalition organized a rally at the station's NBC Tower studios. On May 1, 1998, WMAQ-TV announced that they would cancel the show. Studios USA (now NBCUniversal Syndication Studios), one of the show's distributors, said that the show would move to Fox-owned WFLD the following month. The show moved production to Stamford, Connecticut, in 2009, and ended in 2018.

On June 5, 2000, to improve station reception, the station extended its Sears Tower (now Willis Tower) transmitter's western antenna height to 1,730 feet (527 m). In July 2000, NBC entered into a local marketing agreement (LMA) with WCPX-TV (channel 38) that indirectly resulted from NBC's partial ownership interest in WCPX-TV network partner Pax TV (now Ion Television) and a related management agreement with that network's owned-and-operated stations. Under the LMA, the two stations shared certain programs, while WMAQ handled advertising sales services for channel 38. The agreement also allowed WCPX to air rebroadcasts of channel 5's 6 p.m. and 10 p.m. newscasts on a half-hour delay. The LMA ended on July 1, 2005, upon Pax's rebranding as i: Independent Television.

On September 6, 2003, WMAQ agreed to lease 4,000 square feet (372 m^{2}) of space at the Equitable Building at 401 North Michigan Avenue (one block east of the NBC Tower), with the intent to build a streetside studio for the Chicago market, the first to be used for live broadcasting purposes by a Chicago television station. On February 26, 2004, WMAQ-TV garnered national attention when Katie Couric, Al Roker, and Lester Holt hosted the Today show on Cityfront Plaza to unveil the new studio (known as "Studio 5") at the building's northwest corner. The station's morning and noon newscasts were broadcast from the Michigan Avenue facility until February 2013, when the studio was closed and the space within the 401 Michigan Avenue building was put up for sale, at which time production of both newscasts was moved back to the NBC Tower.

In November 2007, the FCC proposed to fine WMAQ-TV $10,000 for "failure to publicize the existence and location of its children's television programming reports" because the station did not keep adequate records on commercial limits in children's TV programs.

In the fall of 2008, WMAQ-TV's website was relaunched, including a new layout, as part of a larger revamp of the websites of NBC's entire owned-and-operated station group.

In December 2009, the Chicago local division of the National Association of Broadcast Employees and Technicians-Communication Workers of America (NABET) launched a boycott of WMAQ-TV. The station spokeswoman told Lewis Lazare of the Chicago Sun-Times that they did not comment on the labor-related issues affecting the station. In October 1994, prior to the boycott of the station, the union, along with Republican candidate George Larney, had joined forces to boycott WMAQ-TV due to its negotiations involving its national contract with the network. In the summer of 1987, a handful of technicians at WMAQ-TV, WMAQ radio, and WKQX went on strike; technicians at other NBC-owned stations in New York, Los Angeles, Washington, D.C., and Cleveland also went on strike as a result.

On January 18, 2011, the FCC and the Department of Justice approved the acquisition of WMAQ-TV's parent company NBCUniversal by Comcast (one of the largest cable providers in Chicago), with the deal being closed on January 28. As a result, WMAQ, WSNS, and regional sports network Comcast SportsNet Chicago (later NBC Sports Chicago; now defunct) became sister stations. On March 18, 2013, longtime WVIT president and general manager David Doebler was appointed president and general manager of WMAQ-TV, replacing longtime president and general manager Larry Wert, who later became president of WGN-TV's parent Tribune Broadcasting.

On February 3, 2012, the station rejected a political advertisement that contained anti-abortion talking points from activist and Democratic presidential candidate Randall Terry to air during Super Bowl XLVI. With the FCC's approval, the station determined that Terry did not have the bona fides of a serious candidate. The ad included the term "Democrat Party", which the Democratic National Committee considers a pejorative label, and it was contrary to the party's pro-choice platform in general.

In February 2015, WMAQ and the other NBC-owned stations offered live, web-based streaming of programming to subscribers of participating cable and satellite television providers, as provided through TV Everywhere Mobile apps. A month later, in March 2015, WMAQ, WSNS, and Comcast SportsNet Chicago, along with sister stations in New York City, Los Angeles, Dallas–Fort Worth, Miami, Philadelphia, and San Francisco, went live on Sony's internet television service PlayStation Vue as part of its Access package. Two years later, in April 2017, WMAQ-TV, WSNS and NBC Sports Chicago, along with sister stations in New York, Los Angeles, Philadelphia, and San Francisco, went live on YouTube TV.

On April 20, 2021, Kevin Cross, the senior vice president and general manager of NBC Sports Chicago, was officially appointed as president and general manager of WMAQ-TV, beginning in June, taking over from David Doebler, who retired after eight years at the station. Cross became the first president of NBCUniversal's Chicago broadcasting properties and the second Black president of the station in 25 years.

== Programming ==
=== Syndicated programming ===
As of September 2021, syndicated programming broadcast by WMAQ-TV includes Access Hollywood (including its afternoon counterpart) and The Kelly Clarkson Show (all of which are being distributed by corporate sister NBCUniversal Syndication Studios).

=== Programming irregularities ===
- WMAQ-TV was one of four NBC-owned stations (along with sister stations WCAU in Philadelphia, WRC-TV in Washington, D.C. and KNSD in San Diego) that did not carry Access Hollywood Live. The talk show spin-off of Access Hollywood aired from the program's NBC O&O debut in September 2010 until September 2014, when all four stations dropped the program due to low local viewership in those markets.
- On September 17, 2015, WMAQ-TV and the City of Chicago announced a partnership to broadcast the city's New Year's Eve celebrations entitled Chi-Town Rising, a special also syndicated to NBC affiliates across the Midwest. The inaugural, 2015–16 edition began on December 31, 2015, became the highest-rated New Year's Eve television event with a 12.2 household rating, and an 11.2 to 14.7 rating among the age group of 25–54. On September 1, 2016, it was announced the event would return for 2016–17, which began December 31, 2016. The New Year's Eve event was watched by 335,911 households and gained a 9.7 rating and 25 share but lost to WLS-TV's "Countdown Chicago 2017" which had 425,949 households, a 12.3 rating, and a 31 share. On September 11, 2017, WMAQ-TV, Arena Partners and Choose Chicago announced that Chi-Town Rising would not return for 2017. The station had numerous replacement specials including New Year's Eve Live in Chicago from 2017 to 2020 (later remained as New Year's Eve in Chicago for 2020–21 due to the COVID-19 pandemic), and A Very Chicago New Year beginning in 2021.

=== Sports programming ===
==== Bank of America Chicago Marathon and Bank of America Shamrock Shuffle 8K ====
From 2001 to 2002, and again since 2008 (with the exception of 2020 due to the event's cancellation resulting from the COVID-19 pandemic), WMAQ has served as an official broadcaster of the Chicago Marathon, which is held annually every second Sunday in October. Because of its commitments to air the event, the station has had to reschedule NBC News programs preempted or delayed by the telecast of the marathon. Since 2012, WMAQ, through their station's official website NBCChicago.com, currently serves as an official web broadcaster of the Bank of America Shamrock Shuffle. On June 15, 2017, the Bank of America Chicago Marathon, the Bank of America Shamrock Shuffle 8K, and WMAQ-TV announced they will extend their partnership. Sister Telemundo station WSNS-TV announced they would air the marathon in Spanish beginning with the 40th anniversary of the running of the marathon on October 8, 2017. On December 10, 2020, the marathon, the 8K shuffle, WMAQ and WSNS announced that they will extend their partnership again for three more years beginning in 2021 and will cover it through least 2023.

==== Chicago Fire Soccer Club ====
In 2012, WMAQ-TV partnered with the Chicago Fire Soccer Club (now Chicago Fire FC) to carry its matches in the 2012 season live on its NBC Chicago Nonstop subchannel. The local free-to-air rights to the Chicago Fire Soccer Club matches moved to WPWR-TV in 2013.

==== Chicago Blackhawks and Bulls ====
In 2023, WMAQ simulcast two Blackhawks and two Bulls games broadcast by sister network NBC Sports Chicago.

=== News operation ===
WMAQ-TV presently broadcasts 41 hours, 25 minutes of locally produced newscasts each week (with 6 hours, 35 minutes each weekday; four hours on Saturdays and 4 1/2 hours on Sundays). In addition, the station produces the half-hour sports highlight program Sports Sunday, which airs Sunday evenings after the 10 p.m. newscast.

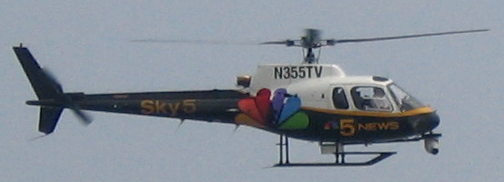
WMAQ's news helicopter, "Sky5" with the old gold 5 logo from July 2006.

==== News department history ====
===== 1990s =====
In January 1991, WMAQ announced plans to launch the Suburban News Source, a 24-hour local cable news channel featuring 4½-minute-long inserts of news headlines specific to suburban localities, placed within live simulcasts of the station's noon, 4 p.m., and 6 p.m. newscasts. Originally scheduled to debut on January 14, 1991, the service was to be distributed to Centel Videopath systems in Chicago's northern, northwestern, and southern suburbs. However, the service's launch was postponed three times due to logistical issues and demands by cable providers to gain a share of the service's advertising revenues. Station management scrapped plans for the channel in June 1991.

On August 24, 1998, WMAQ debuted NBC 5 Chicago Daytime, a one-hour daily lifestyle and entertainment show. The program was hosted by Rosati and Nesita Kwan alongside meteorologist Byron Miranda. The show was reduced to a half-hour on April 26, 1999.

In the spring of 1999, after negotiations between WMAQ-TV management and the American Federation of Television and Radio Artists (AFTRA), nearly all of the station's on-air talent went on strike. On March 30, 1999, the station's on-air talent planned to authorize a strike vote, if a bargaining session with the station scheduled for late April failed. On May 14, 1999, four of the station's high-profile personalities—including 6 p.m. & 10 p.m. anchor Allison Rosati, chief meteorologist Brant Miller, sports anchor Mike Adamle and weekend evening meteorologist Shelly Monahan—broke ranks with the union, following the strike authorization vote.

===== 2000s =====
In early fall 2006, additional changes were made to WMAQ's early evening lineup. On September 18, the station moved the afternoon newscast, with Sirott and Brooks, to 4 p.m. and moved the newsmagazine show Extra to 4:30 pm. The early evening newscast remained at 5 pm. A week later on September 25, 2006, Saunders and Rosati were promoted to anchor the 5 p.m. newscasts.

On January 14, 2008, WMAQ-TV became the second television station in the Chicago market (after WLS-TV) to begin broadcasting its local newscasts in high definition. Only in-studio footage and some of the remote footage, from the field, were presented in HD, while most remote footage was in standard definition, using a mixture of 16:9 (widescreen) and 4:3 cameras.

In March 2008, Johnson was demoted from the weekday newscast but continued his reporting work; Elgas was promoted to weekday morning anchor. On January 12, 2009, WMAQ and Fox owned-and-operated station WFLD entered into a Local News Service agreement, in which the two stations would share helicopter footage. This agreement reportedly paved the way for a larger pooling effort between the two stations. In spring 2009, WMAQ-TV laid off an undisclosed number of employees. In addition, they canceled the Sunday morning newscasts due to budget cuts at the station. The Sunday morning newscasts were revived on November 7, 2010.

In May 2009, the station announced that it would conclude the public affairs program City Desk after 57 years; the show had its final broadcast on May 17, 2009. Two weeks later, on May 31, 2009, The Talk debuted on WMAQ with Brooks as host. Prior to this, Sunday morning anchor Ellee Pai Hong left the station after six years. On June 12, 2009, Bob Sirott left WMAQ-TV for the second time, as his contract with the station had not been renewed. Later, on July 29, 2009, Davlantes' contract with the station was not renewed. On August 10, 2009, WMAQ promoted Stafford to main anchor. He, along with Rosati, co-anchored the 5 pm, 6 p.m., and 10 p.m. newscasts.

For years, WMAQ-TV's 10 p.m. newscast was in second place behind WBBM-TV and, later, WLS-TV, with WBBM-TV third. At the conclusion of the November 2009 Nielsen ratings sweeps period, WBBM-TV's 10 p.m. newscast overtook WMAQ-TV for second place for the first time in many years, largely due to the low ratings of the latter station's lead-in The Jay Leno Show, as WLS-TV continued to dominate the local newscast ratings in the Chicago market.

For five years, beginning in 2006 when WMAQ canceled its 11 a.m. newscast, WMAQ differed from most NBC stations in the Central Time Zone in that it did not carry a newscast in the weekday midday time period. This changed on September 12, 2011, when it debuted a half-hour newscast at noon (the program returned to 11 a.m. when it was reformatted as an hour-long newscast on September 8, 2014). On December 6, 2011, WMAQ-TV announced a partnership with The Chicago Reporter as part of a larger effort by NBCUniversal to partner with non-profit news organizations, following its acquisition by Comcast.

===== 2010s =====
In January 2012, WMAQ-TV announced testing a news partnership with Merlin Media's WIQI (now WKQX) to use audio from all of WMAQ-TV's newscasts, including morning, noon, afternoon, 5 p.m., 6 p.m., and 10 p.m. newscasts, as well as the sharing of assignments and online content between the two stations. The news partnership ended on July 17, 2012, when WIQI switched to an adult hits format, branded as "i101".

On July 27, 2013, WMAQ expanded its weekend morning newscasts, with the early edition of the program on both days expanding to two hours with the addition of an hour-long broadcast at 5 a.m. (from a previous 6 a.m. start) and an additional half-hour added at 10 a.m. on Sundays. On February 9, 2014, the Chicago Sun-Times announced that it would end its content partnership with WMAQ-TV, and enter into a new content agreement with ABC-owned station WLS-TV on February 10, 2014. In 2015, WMAQ became the first television station in the Chicago market to upgrade its news helicopter's camera system to shoot footage in ultra high definition. On August 24, 2015, WMAQ expanded its weekday morning newscast to three hours, with the addition of a half-hour at 4 am, becoming the second Chicago television station to expand into the timeslot – possibly to compete with WGN-TV, which began expanding its weekday morning newscast into the time period in July 2011.

On August 8, 2016, the station's hour-long 4 p.m. newscast was revived after a 21-year absence, serving as a replacement for Extra, which moved to WFLD after a 20-year absence. WMAQ-TV became the third station in Chicago to expand into the time period, following WGN-TV (which began its 4 p.m. newscast in September 2014) and WLS-TV (which began expanding into the time period in the 1980s), indicating a decreased reliance on syndicated programming. With this addition, WMAQ-TV was reduced to only three hours of syndicated daytime shows to back up its newscasts outside of NBC network programming.

On August 23, 2019, WMAQ-TV announced that they were cutting the 11 a.m. newscast to a half-hour on Fridays in favor of its new lifestyle show Chicago Today effective September 6 (The Monday to Thursday editions later cut them to 45 minutes on December 6, 2021, on a temporary basis during the holiday season; then it became permanent on January 3, 2022).

===== 2020s =====
On March 16, 2020, WMAQ-TV announced that the 6 p.m. newscast would expand to a full hour with a half-hour extension at 6:30 pm, making channel 5 the second station in Chicago to have a 6:30 p.m. newscast (after WGN-TV's hour-long 6 p.m. weeknight newscast which debuted in 2017). This extension was intended to be temporary due to the COVID-19 pandemic.

On January 20, 2022, WMAQ-TV launched a new 24-hour streaming channel on NBCUniversal's streaming service Peacock. "NBC Chicago News" features simulcasts and encores of the station's newscasts as well as original content made for the channel. Prior to the launch of the streaming channel, the station had a curated playlist available on the streaming service since its April 2020 launch. The streaming channel was later launched on The Roku Channel on June 28, 2022.

==== Notable current on-air staff ====
- Stefan Holt – anchor; also the son of NBC Nightly News anchor Lester Holt
- Brant Miller (AMS Seal of Approval) – chief meteorologist
- Allison Rosati – anchor

==== Notable former on-air staff ====
^{^[†]} Indicates deceased

- Mike Adamle
- Jackie Bange
- Jonathon Brandmeier
- Danny Bonaduce
- Susan Carlson
- John Coleman^{†}
- Chet Coppock^{†}
- Jim Cummins^{†}
- Anna Davlantes
- Billy Dec
- Steve Dolinsky
- Jill Dougherty
- Alex Dreier^{†}
- Tom Duggan^{†}
- Roger Ebert^{†}
- Russ Ewing^{†}
- Paula Faris
- Tsi-Tsi-Ki Felix
- Renee Ferguson^{†}
- Mark Giangreco
- Greg Gumbel^{†}
- Daniella Guzman
- Steve Handelsman
- Chuck Henry
- Cassidy Hubbarth
- Amy Jacobson
- Walter Jacobson
- Dick Johnson^{†}
- Floyd Kalber^{†}
- David Kaplan
- Jon Kelley
- Sarah Kustok
- Don Lemon
- Tammy Leitner
- Shelley Long
- Ron Magers
- Carol Marin
- Robin Meade
- Al Meltzer^{†}
- Erin Moriarty
- Johnny Morris
- Byron Miranda
- Deborah Norville
- Mike North
- Pat O'Brien
- Anita Padilla
- John Palmer^{†}
- Jane Pauley
- Maury Povich
- Cindy Preszler
- Ash-har Quraishi
- Leila Rahimi
- Carol Anne Riddell
- Max Robinson^{†}
- Zoraida Sambolin
- Warner Saunders^{†}
- Mark Schanowski
- Carole Simpson
- Bob Sirott
- Jerry Springer^{†}
- Tammie Souza
- Rob Stafford
- Amy Stone
- Ray Suarez
- Mark Suppelsa
- Jerry Taft^{†}
- Martha Teichner
- Charlie Van Dyke
- Harry Volkman^{†}
- Jenniffer Weigel
- Tim Weigel^{†}
- Bruce Wolf
- Linda Yu
- Ginger Zee

== Community outreach ==
Carol Cooling-Kopp, WMAQ-TV's longtime community relations assistant and vice president for Special Projects and Community Relations, died on October 30, 2013, suffering from lung cancer; longtime WVIT Community Projects director Emma Asante was appointed to Cooling-Kopp's position in March 2014.

=== Wednesday's Child ===
In 1999, WMAQ-TV partnered with the Illinois Department of Children and Family Services and the Freddie Mac Foundation to create a news series called Wednesday's Child, which is aired on the 6 p.m. newscast on Wednesdays and on the Sunday morning newscasts. The mission of the news series is to bring the children to the living rooms of about 500,000 Chicago area residents that have never adopted. Allison Rosati, a former foster child, served as a host for the news series, and remained until their last report in 2005.

== Controversies ==
=== Bruce Sagan and Len O'Conner ===
Veteran newsman Len O'Connor worked his way up from a news writer for NBC Radio's Blue Network to be the commentator at WMAQ-TV. O'Connor, who was well known for his often-acerbic political commentary, ran afoul of the station's management in 1974, when he reported on Governor Dan Walker's appointment of Bruce Sagan as head of the Illinois Arts Council. O'Connor was troubled by the council's funding grant to the Chicago Dance Foundation, which was headed by Sagan's wife. Following O'Connor's original, January 1974 commentary on the grant, Sagan was invited to appear on the station and rebut O'Connor's statements. He declined and subsequently filed a complaint with the FCC in May 1974. Sagan claimed that he had been personally attacked and felt that the station was not enforcing the FCC's Fairness Doctrine. He was again offered an opportunity to refute O'Connor's comments but declined once again after the FCC dismissed the charges he levied. Sagan appealed the FCC's decision, and O'Connor believed that the company's attorneys had secretly met with Sagan and offered him airtime in exchange for Sagan withdrawing his appeal. WMAQ-TV management stated that they had been open with O'Connor on the matter.

O'Connor proceeded to deliver three commentaries on the 10 p.m. newscast from September 25 to 27, 1974, which were severely critical of the situation's handling by WMAQ-TV station management. In the commentaries, O'Connor claimed he had been deprived of his freedom of speech, that the station compromised his integrity, and that station management had made secret plans to fire him within a short time after his broadcasts. O'Connor left the station and continued his political commentaries, on WGN-TV, until his retirement from broadcasting in 1980.

=== Hiring of Jerry Springer ===
WMAQ achieved notoriety in 1997 when, in an effort to boost ratings for its newscasts, the station hired Jerry Springer as a commentator.

Though Springer was once a two-term mayor of Cincinnati before becoming a news anchor for that city's NBC affiliate WLWT, his association with his infamous syndicated talk show (which, until 2009, was recorded at WMAQ's NBC Tower studios, and later distributed by NBCUniversal through its syndication division) led to the belief that the newscast was being dumbed down. There were a handful of Springer supporters; nevertheless, the incident triggered a lot of negative publicity, on both the local and national levels. The station's longtime anchor team of Carol Marin and Ron Magers resigned in protest (with Marin resigning on May 1, and Magers following suit on May 16). As Marin signed off her last newscast, station personnel stood en masse in the newsroom behind her—WMAQ's newscasts at that time originated from a studio that opened into the station's newsroom—in a symbolic show of support for her decision to resign. Ratings declined, with the station's newscasts losing 20% of its audience share by the November 1997 sweeps period. Springer only made two commentaries before he resigned on May 8, feeling unhappy with the criticism he received.

Magers wound up at rival WLS-TV, where he remained until his retirement in 2016. Marin, meanwhile, joined rival WBBM-TV, while contributing reports for CBS News, before returning to WMAQ in 2004 as a special correspondent until she stepped down from the station for the second time in 2020. Lyle Banks, who had hired Springer as a commentator, was fired from his position as general manager in January 1998 and was replaced by Larry Wert, who served as WMAQ's president and general manager until 2013, when he left to become president of WGN-TV parent Tribune Broadcasting. Five months later, on May 20, 1998, Cheatwood resigned as news director and was replaced by former WLS-TV news director Frank Whittaker, who served as WMAQ's news director until 1999, when he was promoted to vice president of news, where he remains today.

=== Amy Jacobson and Craig Stebic ===
On July 10, 2007, Amy Jacobson, who had been a reporter at WMAQ-TV since 1997, negotiated her exit with the station, after the release of a videotape in which she and her two sons were spotted at the home of Craig Stebic, with Jacobson clad in a bikini. Craig's wife, Lisa Stebic, was missing and had not been found as of that date. The incident raised the issue whether Jacobson crossed a journalistic ethical line by being friendly with the subject of the story. The video of Jacobson at Craig Stebic's home was obtained by rival WBBM-TV, either taken by or given to its news department, which posted the entire six-minute video on its website. In 2008, Jacobson filed a libel lawsuit against WBBM for $1 million after the video was posted. The suit was thrown out by an Illinois judge in July 2013.

=== Pat Quinn campaign commercial ===
In October 2014, WMAQ-TV strongly objected to a video clip from one of its news reports appearing in a commercial for Governor Pat Quinn's re-election campaign. The commercial included an excerpt from a news report about Bruce Rauner, and an audio clip of reporter Carol Marin, based on the joint investigation by the station and its former news partner the Chicago Sun-Times—reported by Marin, producer Don Moseley, and Sun-Times political reporter Dave McKinney—into Rauner's business practices. On October 10, 2014, the station released a statement on the 10 p.m. newscast, and on the station's website, that said that the station is required by law to air campaign commercials bought by bona fide candidates for public office and the commercial is not an endorsement of Governor Quinn by Marin and WMAQ-TV.

=== Death of JongHyun ===
On December 19, 2017, during the station's morning newscast, the station mistakenly ran a video of South Korean pop group BTS, from their appearance on the syndicated program The Ellen DeGeneres Show in November, while reporting on the death of SHINee's founding member JongHyun. Fans of the respective K-pop groups commented on social media, using the hashtag #NBCChicagoApologize, with the hashtag trending worldwide on Twitter. The station apologized for the mistake on the morning newscast and on the station's social media accounts the next day.

== Technical information and subchannels ==
WMAQ-TV and WSNS-TV transmit using WMAQ-TV's spectrum from an antenna atop the Willis Tower. The stations' signals are multiplexed:

Subchannels of WMAQ-TV and WSNS-TV
License	Subchannel	Res.	Short name	Programming
WMAQ-TV	5.1	1080i	NBC5	NBC
WMAQ-TV	5.2	480i	COZI	Cozi TV
WMAQ-TV	5.3	480i	CRIMES	NBC True CRMZ
WMAQ-TV	5.4	480i	OXYGEN	Oxygen
WMAQ-TV	2.4	480i	365BLK	365BLK (WBBM-TV)
WSNS-TV	44.1	1080i	WSNS-HD	Telemundo
WSNS-TV	44.2	480i	T-XITOS	TeleXitos (4:3)

Broadcast on behalf of another station

Subchannel broadcast with MPEG-4 video

=== WMAQ-DT2 ===
In January 2005, WMAQ launched digital subchannel 5.2 as a charter affiliate of NBC Weather Plus. On December 1, 2008, the weather network ceased national broadcasts, although afterward, as NBC Plus, the subchannel continued to provide local weather maps and traffic reports, as well as "raw" coverage of various live events, including Barack Obama's victory rally in Grant Park and Governor Rod Blagojevich's impeachment trial. On November 1, 2010, WMAQ launched NBC Chicago Nonstop, a news and lifestyle network featuring local programming and programs produced by corporate sister LXTV. NBC Nonstop was relaunched as Cozi TV, which soft-launched on December 20, 2012 (officially launching on January 1, 2013).

=== Analog-to-digital conversion ===
WMAQ-TV ended regular programming on its analog signal, over VHF channel 5, on June 12, 2009, the official date on which full-power television stations in the United States transitioned from analog to digital broadcasts under federal mandate. The station's digital signal continued to be broadcast on its pre-transition UHF channel 29, using virtual channel 5.

From June 13 to July 12, 2009, in an "unprecedented" four-station partnership, WMAQ-TV simulcast most of its newscasts as a contributor to WWME-CA (channel 23)'s analog nightlight service for the Chicago area. The "lifeline" programming provided on analog UHF channel 23 included WMAQ's weekday and Saturday morning, weeknight 6 p.m. and weekend 5 p.m. newscasts, along with WGN-TV (channel 9)'s 9 p.m. newscast. The lifeline continued only as a simulcast of entertainment programming from WWME's sister station WCIU-TV (channel 26) until January 2011, when it switched to a simulcast of WCIU's "The U Too" subchannel.

On April 13, 2017, it was revealed that the over-the-air spectrum of sister station WSNS-TV had been sold in the FCC's spectrum reallocation auction, fetching $141.7 million. WSNS-TV did not sign off for good, but it now shares broadcast spectrum with WMAQ-TV. WMAQ-TV was reallocated from UHF channel 29 to UHF channel 33 on October 18, 2019, as part of the FCC's 5G network spectrum reallocation.

== See also ==
- Channel 5 virtual TV stations in the United States
- Channel 33 digital TV stations in the United States
- List of television stations in Illinois (by channel number)
- WMAQ (AM) (670 AM, now WSCR)
- WKQX (FM) (101.1 MHz), formerly WMAQ-FM/WNIS-FM
