= Jonathan Utley =

American history professor

Jonathan G. Utley (born June 24, 1942), is a retired professor of history at the University of Tennessee and author of several books.

== Works ==
- An American battleship at peace and war : the U.S.S. Tennessee. Lawrence, KY, 1991.
- Going to war with Japan, 1937-1941. Knoxville, TN, 1985.
- The Department of State and the Far East, 1937-1941; a study of the ideas behind its diplomacy. Urbana-Champaign, IL, 1970.
- Diplomacy and force : America's road to war, 1931-1941, together with Waldo H. Heinrichs and Marc S. Gallicchio, Chicago, 1996.
