= ABC 2000 Today =

ABC coverage of the turn of the 20th century

- Also known as: ABC 2000
- Presented by: Peter Jennings
- Starring: Barbara Walters; Diane Sawyer; Charles Gibson; Elizabeth Vargas; Jack Ford; Sam Donaldson; Connie Chung; Cokie Roberts; Deborah Roberts; Carole Simpson; Morton Dean; Dick Clark
- Theme music composer: Gavin Greenaway
- Opening theme: IllumiNations: Reflections of Earth
- Country of origin: United States

Production
- Production locations: Times Square Studios, Manhattan, New York (Primary)
- Running time: 23 hours 10 minutes

Original release
- Network: ABC
- Release: December 31, 1999 – January 1, 2000

ABC 2000 (officially ABC 2000 Today) is ABC News' special programming covering the Millennium celebrations around the world from December 31, 1999, into January 1, 2000, as part of the worldwide consortium 2000 Today programming in the United States. ABC World News Tonight anchor Peter Jennings hosted the program from the Times Square Studios in Manhattan, New York City, New York. It ran 23 hours and 10 minutes, signing on at 4:50 am ET on December 31, 1999 and concluding at 4:00 am ET on January 1, 2000 (two hours earlier from its international counterparts).

ABC temporarily converted the Good Morning America Times Square Studios into a type of "millennium command center" that included an anchor desk, where a standing Jennings spent most of his time and two lounge chairs, where Jennings would interview guests. A large video screen included a time-zone map of the world, a wall of clocks, and a makeshift newsroom where ABC News staffers would follow the latest developments, particularly if there were any Y2K problems. The windows of the studio directly overlooked Times Square, the traditional center of New Year's Eve celebrations in New York. Since worldwide Y2K issues proved minimal, as the day progressed, the coverage shifted largely to "more party than news".

== Correspondents and guests ==
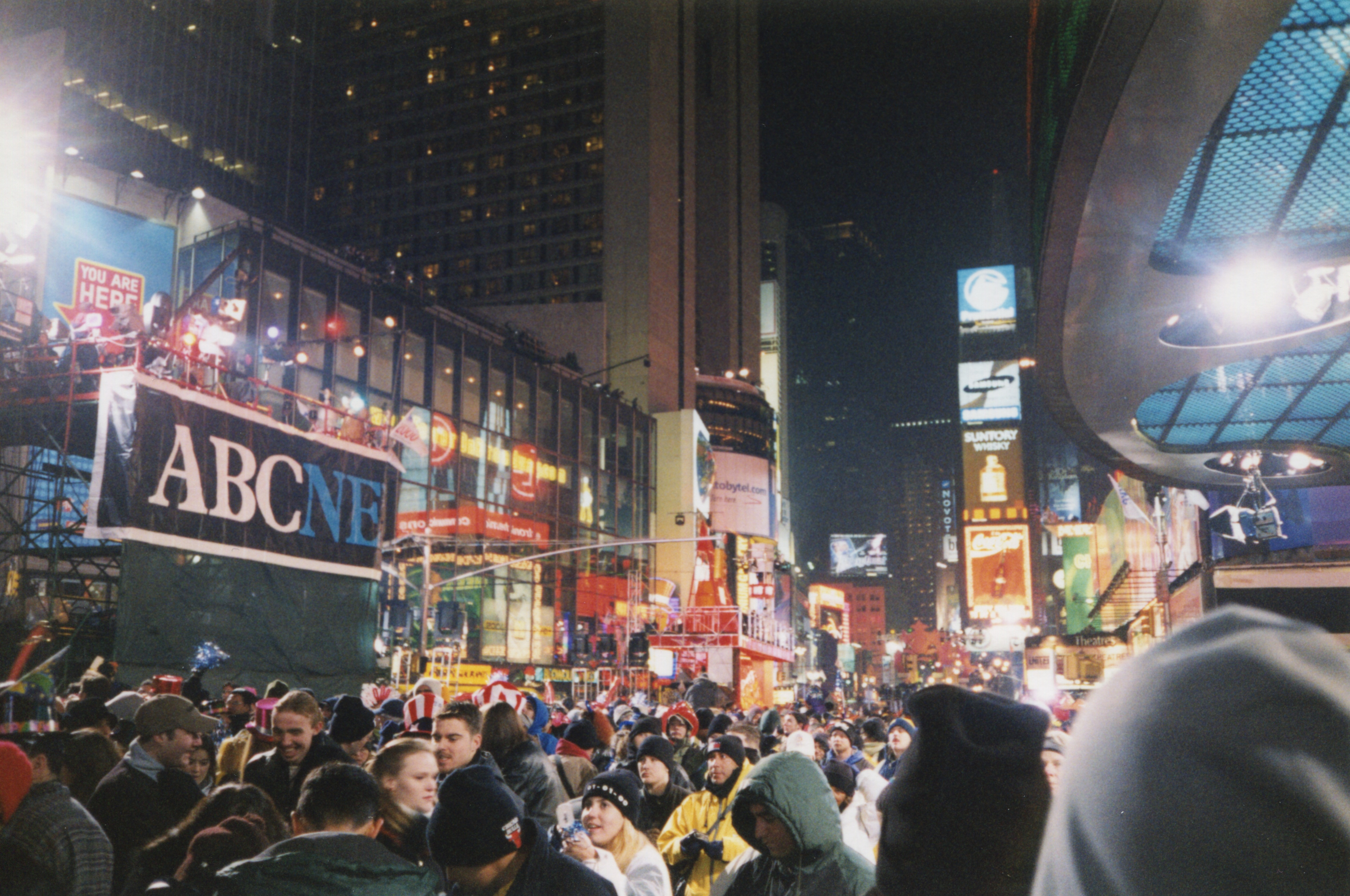
ABC News's stage in Times Square.

Jack Ford was stationed at street level in Times Square throughout the broadcast. He was joined in the 11 p.m. (eastern) hour by entertainer Dick Clark (the creator and host of his namesake New Year's Rockin' Eve, which did not air due to ABC 2000 being shown instead). Clark reported from the tenth floor of the Marriott Marquis hotel, to conduct his traditional countdown of the Times Square Ball drop. Featured correspondents included: Barbara Walters in Paris, Diane Sawyer in New York, Charles Gibson in London, Cokie Roberts in Rome, Elizabeth Vargas in Sydney, Connie Chung in Las Vegas, Deborah Roberts in Orlando, Carole Simpson in Chicago, and Sam Donaldson at the Y2K Coordination Center in Washington, D.C. More than thirty additional ABC News correspondents were stationed around the world to cover the new year in nearly every time zone. The broadcast was directed by Roger Goodman and included more than 1,000 technicians and members of the news division.

In-studio guests included famed Australian comedian Barry Humphries in character as Dame Edna, David Blane, Al Franken, Rudy Giuliani, and Neil deGrasse Tyson. Longtime ABC anchor Howard K. Smith was interviewed via telephone, as was Alan Alda, and former president Gerald Ford. Musical performances included: Billy Joel, Elton John, Enrique Iglesias, Faith Hill, 'N Sync, Phish, the Bee Gees, Aerosmith, Bonnie Raitt, Neil Diamond, Harry Connick Jr., Kenny G, Ray Charles, Barry Manilow, and Barbra Streisand. The performances by the Bee Gees, Phish, Charlotte Church, and Kenny G were selected to appear in the international 2000 Today program.

== Broadcast highlights ==
Planning for what would become ABC 2000 started in late 1998. Dick Clark shared preliminary plans during the December 31, 1998 – January 1, 1999 episode of New Year's Rockin' Eve:

"1999 is with us. It's going to be the prelude to the biggest millennium celebration you have ever seen. I urge you to make sure to be with ABC because it'll be worldwide coverage. Not only of just Times Square, we're going to expand our coverage on New Year's Eve...Rockin' Eve 2000 [sic]. It'll be the biggest thing you have ever seen with more entertainment and more coverage. And it'll all happen here on ABC."

— Dick Clark, Dick Clark's New Year's Rockin' Eve '99 (ABC-TV)

In March 1999, ABC announced their official plans for the ABC 2000 program. It was to feature 27 hours of coverage, anchored by Peter Jennings (it was later reduced to 23 hours and 10 minutes). For the first time since its premiere in 1972, New Year's Rockin' Eve would not air. However, according to ABC News president David Westin, Dick Clark would "have some role in the New Year's special". Originally, the name of the broadcast was ABC 2000, but it was officially and formally retitled as ABC 2000 Today because ABC joined 60 other nations, all celebrating the dawn of the new millennium. The network was part of the 2000 Today consortium.

The program was nonetheless consistently promoted and broadcast under the ABC 2000 title, possibly to avoid confusion with the U.S. morning show Today, which airs on rival network NBC. The theme music for ABC 2000 (which was also used for ABC News' election coverage that year) was from Epcot's IllumiNations: Reflections of Earth live show. The music was composed by Gavin Greenaway, who won an Emmy award for the work. Taped footage of the IllumiNations: Reflections of Earth show were shown in the opening and closing sequences. Along with the multitude of celebrations, the news division was also prepared to report on any Y2K problems. Sam Donaldson and James Walker headed up those tasks. Walker was stationed in New Zealand, which would be the first industrialized and highly-populated nation to see midnight; it was expected to serve as a "litmus test" for the rest of the developed world.

Coverage signed on Friday, December 31, 1999 at 4:50 a.m. Eastern Standard Time (9:50 UTC), ten minutes prior to the first midnight on the globe at Millennium Island in Kiribati (UTC+14:00). Peter Jennings anchored the coverage for the entire duration, using commercial breaks, affiliate breaks, correspondent pieces, and pre-taped segments to rest, eat, or change outfits. He changed his wardrobe five times. He opened the broadcast wearing a brown business suit and tie. He changed to a black suit at 12 noon, followed by a dark gray suit around 4 p.m., and a dark blue suit and red tie around 7 p.m. for the primetime portion. He then wore a tuxedo and bow tie during the midnight hour in Times Square, followed by a more casual green sweater for the final three hours of the broadcast.

Midnight was specifically shown in 17 time zones, including three 30 minute offset time zones, and one 45 minute offset time zone. ABC correspondents covered 14 of the midnight milestones in-person, while the rest were simulcast from one of the other 2000 Today networks. The final midnight celebration shown was that of the Pacific Time Zone (UTC−08:00), which included California. Once the culminating celebrations in Times Square settled down, the final three hours covered the Central, Mountain, and Pacific time zones, but were also filled with several concert look-ins (whether live or pre-taped), live performances, and pre-taped highlight segments. The broadcast signed off Saturday January 1, 2000 at 4:00 a.m. Eastern (09:00 UTC). No coverage of midnight was shown of the remaining three time zones, which included Alaska, Hawaii, American Samoa, and parts of Polynesia east of the International Date Line. While ABC ended their coverage in the United States, other 2000 Today networks continued airing for an additional two hours until the final millennium celebration in Samoa.

A digital on-screen clock was used in the bottom-right corner of the screen through much of the broadcast, showing local time and/or a countdown to midnight during each correspondents' report. Live chats were organized on ABCNews.com. Breaks were taken near the top and bottom of each hour to allow the local ABC affiliates time for local coverage, which varied from local news and weather to full-scale coverage of local countdowns and possible Y2K bug effects (which were minimal).

=== Follow-ups ===
After signing off ABC 2000 at 4 a.m. eastern, the ABC network sent the air time back to the affiliates for a few hours. At 8 a.m. eastern, the network came back on with a three-hour wrap-up special titled Dawn of a New Era hosted by Sam Donaldson from Washington, D.C. The program featured highlights from the entire day and the latest developments, and was picked up by some affiliates. Coverage on ABC then shifted to the Rose Parade followed by New Year's Day college football bowl games. Reruns of highlights aired a day later during the Sunday morning talk shows, and sporadically over the next several days.

Later that year, ABC News also used the Times Square Studios for ABC News's 2000 election coverage ABC 2000: The Vote, with the studio set up very similar to that of ABC 2000. The large video screen was used to show the Electoral College map of the United States with the red and blue states indicated.

On December 31, 2001 (leading into 2002), ABC preceded the primetime hour of New Year's Rockin' Eve with a follow-up special titled ABC 2002. The three-and-a-half-hour special featured a "meaningful and reflective" view on New Year's celebrations from around the world (especially in the wake of the September 11 attacks), and performances by Arlo Guthrie, Sting, and U2. It was hosted by Jennings from the Rose Center for Earth and Space in New York City.

=== Reception ===
ABC 2000 was by far the most comprehensive New Year's coverage of any of the three major broadcast networks in the United States, and was named one of the best television programs of the year. By contrast, CBS aired only 30-second news updates each hour throughout the day with Dan Rather, a special 8 p.m. edition of the Late Show with David Letterman and from 10 p.m. to 1 a.m. ET, Rather and Will Smith hosted America's Millennium live from Times Square and Washington D.C. respectively. NBC had an extended edition of The Today Show, Dateline NBC at 8 p.m. and from 9 p.m. to 3:30 a.m. ET, Tom Brokaw and Katie Couric anchored NBC's millennium coverage, which included a special edition of The Tonight Show with Jay Leno, from Los Angeles. PBS, meanwhile, aired Millennium 2000, which was a basic simulcast of the worldwide 2000 Today consortium footage. Cable network CNN had all-day news coverage, and highlighted several smaller celebrations.

With the lack of Y2K problems, ABC 2000's coverage shifted largely to "more party than news". Sam Donaldson, who was assigned to the Y2K Coordination Center in Washington, D.C., was ultimately called on sparingly. At one point in the evening, an unflustered Donaldson proclaimed simply "nothing going on", quipping humorously that the only issue domestically thus far was slot machines in Delaware shutting off for a brief period of time.

The primetime portion of the broadcast registered a 10.6 rating, and average of 18.6 million viewers. The broadcast peaked from 11:15 p.m. to midnight (eastern) with a 16.1 rating/30 share. At least 175 million viewers tuned into some portions of ABC 2000, and ABC easily defeated both CBS and NBC for the night. The broadcast won two News and Documentary Emmy Awards, a Peabody Award, a TCA Award, and was nominated for a DGA Award. Highlights of the telecast were released on VHS titled ABC 2000 The New Millennium Highlights. Reflecting on the event, Dick Clark was enthusiastic about his participation, feeling that it was one of the biggest nights he had ever spent in Times Square.

== ABC 2000 Hour-by-hour overview ==
Hour (ET)	Time (UTC)	Correspondent Reports, Features, and Performances
4:50 a.m.	09:50	Opening and introduction by Peter Jennings at the ABC News Times Square Studios in New York City; Breaking news report by Morton Dean in Moscow about the early resignation of Boris Yeltsin
5:00 a.m.	10:00	Midnight at Kiribati and Millennium Island; Midnight at Tonga; Elizabeth Vargas in Sydney, Australia reporting on 9 p.m. fireworks show; James Walker at The Beehive in Wellington, New Zealand; Cokie Roberts at Vatican City; Midnight at Pitt Island, Chatham Islands, New Zealand (Chatham Standard Time Zone); Barbara Walters near the Eiffel Tower in Paris, France; Bill Blakemore at Manger Square/Church of the Nativity in Bethlehem; Jack Ford in Times Square, New York City; Charles Gibson at County Hall on the South Bank of River Thames in London, England; Elizabeth Vargas at the Sydney Opera House in Sydney, Australia
6:00 a.m.	11:00	Midnight with Suzy Aiken in Auckland, New Zealand; James Walker at The Beehive in Wellington, New Zealand; Sam Donaldson at the Y2K Coordination Center in Washington, D.C.; Elizabeth Vargas at the Sydney Opera House in Sydney, Australia; Performance by Annie Lennox & Dave Stewart (Eurythmics): "The Miracle of Love"
7:00 a.m.	12:00	Jack Ford in Times Square, New York City, with the raising of the Times Square Ball; Overture to the World; Charles Gibson at County Hall on the South Bank of River Thames in London, England; Barbara Walters near the Eiffel Tower in Paris, France; Sam Donaldson at the Y2K Coordination Center in Washington, D.C.; Lynn Sherr in Bombay, India; Mark Litke at The Bund in Shanghai, China; Peter Jennings with Mayor Rudy Giuliani at the Times Square Studios in New York City; Deborah Roberts at the Millennium Celebration at Epcot at Walt Disney World near Orlando, Florida; Performance by Central Florida Performing Arts School children's choir: "Millennium"
8:00 a.m.	13:00	Midnight with Elizabeth Vargas at the Sydney Opera House in Sydney, Australia; Commander Mark Patton aboard the USS Topeka at the International Date Line; Peter Jennings & Diane Sawyer (Times Square), Lynn Sherr (Bombay), Cokie Roberts (Vatican) on the topic of women in the 21st century; Midnight in Adelaide, Australia; Carole Simpson at the Hyatt Regency McCormick Place in Chicago, Illinois; Barbara Walters near the Eiffel Tower in Paris, France; Seoul, South Korea: performance at Injeongjeon; General Thomas A. Schwartz, Commander, U.S. forces in South Korea
9:00 a.m.	14:00	News updates: resignation of Boris Yeltsin, Indian Airlines Flight 814 hostage crisis; Highlights of the day narrated by Bob Brown; Jim Wooten in Ali Adde, Djibouti; Peter Jennings & Robert Krulwich at the Times Square Studios in New York City; Hong Kong, China; Betsy Stark covering Muhammad Ali ringing the opening bell at the New York Stock Exchange; John Miller with New York City Fire Commissioner Thomas von Essen in East Harlem, New York City; Live look-in of Maki Ohguro concert in Nara, Japan; Mark Litke at The Bund in Shanghai, China
10:00 a.m.	15:00	Midnight in Nara, Japan; Bosingak bell in Seoul, South Korea; Jack Ford & Diane Sawyer in Times Square, New York City; Charles Gibson at County Hall on the South Bank of River Thames in London, England; Barbara Walters near the Eiffel Tower in Paris, France; Bill Blakemore at Manger Square/Church of the Nativity in Bethlehem; Behind the scenes look with director Roger Goodman; Deborah Roberts at the Millennium Celebration at Epcot at Walt Disney World near Orlando, Florida; Larry Hothem at the South Pole in Antarctica; Peter Jennings with Neil deGrasse Tyson at the Times Square Studios in New York City
11:00 a.m.	16:00	Midnight with Mark Litke at The Bund in Shanghai, China; Midnight at the Millennium Altar in Beijing, China; Remarks from President Bill Clinton on resignation of Boris Yeltsin; Update on Indian Airlines Flight 814 hostage crisis; Sam Donaldson at the Y2K Coordination Center in Washington, D.C.; James Walker at The Beehive in Wellington, New Zealand; Barbara Walters near the Eiffel Tower in Paris, France; Cokie Roberts at St. Peter's Square in the Vatican City with her mother Lindy Boggs (U.S. Ambassador to the Holy See); Dawn at Mount Hikurangi in Gisborne, New Zealand with the Māori people; Performance by Dame Kiri Te Kanawa in Gisborne, New Zealand
12:00 p.m.	17:00	Midnight at Borobudur Temple in Java, Indonesia; Mark Litke at The Bund in Shanghai, China; Transfer of control of the Panama Canal; Peter Jennings & Diane Sawyer at the Times Square Studios in New York City; Bill Blakemore at Manger Square/Church of the Nativity in Bethlehem; Peter Jennings with Todd Brewster at the Times Square Studios in New York City
1:00 p.m.	18:00	Betsy Stark covering the closing bell at the New York Stock Exchange; Juju Chang with Brian Cury (EarthCam) in Times Square, New York City; Barbara Walters near the Eiffel Tower in Paris, France; Gewandhaus Orchestra in Leipzig, Germany; Jim McKay in Washington, D.C.; Midnight (IST) with Lynn Sherr in Bombay, India; Ken Dychtwald at Union Square, San Francisco; Charles Gibson at County Hall on the South Bank of River Thames in London, England; Derry, Northern Ireland: "Danny Boy"; Sunrise in Sydney, Australia; Aaron Brown reporting on minor events: First wedding, first baby born, Rocky Steps at the Philadelphia Museum of Art in Philadelphia, Pennsylvania; Robin Roberts in Los Angeles, California on the topic of women in sports
2:00 p.m.	19:00	Cynthia McFadden at Central Park in Havana, Cuba; Cuban National Assembly president Ricardo Alarcón; Castle Square, Warsaw, Poland; Live look-in of Robyn concert at Royal Palace, Stockholm, Sweden; Cokie Roberts at St. Peter's Square in the Vatican City; Barbara Walters near the Eiffel Tower in Paris, France; Charles Gibson at County Hall on the South Bank of River Thames in London, England; Bill Redeker at Copacabana Beach in Rio de Janeiro, Brazil; Kevin Newman at Cape Spear in Newfoundland, Canada; Peter Jennings with "Dame Edna Everage" (Barry Humphries) at the Times Square Studios in New York City
3:00 p.m.	20:00	Taped performance by Charlotte Church at the Royal Observatory, Greenwich: "She Moved Through the Fair"; Charlotte Church in Cardiff, Wales; Prague, Czech Republic; Telephone interview with Stephen Jay Gould; Jack Smith at the America Online Network Operations Center in Fairfax County, Virginia; Telephone interview with Howard K. Smith (father of Jack Smith); Live look-in of Jean-Michel Jarre concert at The Pyramids in Giza, Egypt; Barbara Walters near the Eiffel Tower in Paris, France; Performance by barbershop quartet The Acoustics
4:00 p.m.	21:00	Midnight with Morton Dean at Red Square in Moscow; Midnight with Jim Wooten in Ali Adde, Djibouti; Queen Elizabeth II & Prince Philip departing for Tower Hill to light the National Beacon (Charles Gibson reporting); Charles Gibson at County Hall on the South Bank of River Thames in London, England; Carole Simpson at Humboldt Park Field House in Chicago, Illinois; Major General Harry D. Raduege Jr. at Cheyenne Mountain Operations Center near Colorado Springs, Colorado; John McWethy at The Pentagon; Queen Elizabeth II at Tower Bridge in London, England lighting the National Beacon (Charles Gibson reporting); Peter Jennings & Robert Krulwich at the Times Square Studios in New York City; Peter Jennings with Al Franken at the Times Square Studios in New York City; Lisa Stark at the FAA Flight Operations Center in Herndon, Virginia; The Acropolis in Athens, Greece, with George Stephanopoulos in-studio
5:00 p.m.	22:00	Midnight with Bill Blakemore at Manger Square/Church of the Nativity in Bethlehem; Midnight at The Pyramids in Giza, Egypt; Midnight at The Acropolis in Athens, Greece (George Stephanopoulos in-studio); Billy Joel at Madison Square Garden in New York City; Telephone interview with Theodore K. Rabb; Overture to the World; Peter Jennings with Cornel West at the Times Square Studios in New York City; Ephesus Seventh-day Adventist Church in New York City
6:00 p.m.	23:00	Midnight (CET) with Barbara Walters near the Eiffel Tower in Paris, France; Midnight (CET) with Cokie Roberts at St. Peter's Square in the Vatican City; Midnight (CET) in Berlin, Germany; Midnight (CET) in Madrid, Spain; Jack Ford in Times Square, New York City; James Walker at The Beehive in Wellington, New Zealand; Sam Donaldson at the Y2K Coordination Center in Washington, D.C.; John McWethy at The Pentagon; Highlights of the day narrated by Bob Brown; death of Elliot Richardson; Millennium Dome at Greenwich Peninsula, London, England (Charles Gibson reporting)
7:00 p.m.	0:00	Midnight (GMT) with Charles Gibson at County Hall on the South Bank of River Thames in London, England; Midnight (WET) in Reykjavík, Iceland; Lisa Stark at the FAA Flight Operations Center in Herndon, Virginia; NSYNC performing at Epcot at Walt Disney World near Orlando, Florida; Jack Ford in Times Square, New York City; Charles Gibson at County Hall on the South Bank of River Thames in London, England; Millennium Dome at Greenwich Peninsula, London, England; Barbara Walters near the Eiffel Tower in Paris, France
8:00 p.m.	1:00	Connie Chung at the Bellagio in Las Vegas, Nevada; Look-in of Elton John concert at Thomas & Mack Center, University of Nevada, Las Vegas; Connie Chung with Wayne Newton; Jack Ford with Mary Ann Hopkins from Doctors Without Borders in Times Square, New York City. Hopkins was selected to push the ceremonial button with Mayor Giuliani "activating" the ball drop countdown.; Telephone interview with former president Gerald Ford; John Quiñones at South Beach in Miami, Florida; Performance by Enrique Iglesias at Madison Square Garden in New York City: "Bailamos"; Telephone interview with oil rig roustabout Vernon Lucas off the coast of Louisiana; Performance by Jared Choclatt Crawford, Larry Wright, and the cast of Keep Bangin': "Clap Your Hands"; Peter Jennings with David Blaine at the Times Square Studios in New York City
9:00 p.m.	2:00	Midnight (BRT) with Bill Redeker at Copacabana Beach in Rio de Janeiro, Brazil; Tahai, Easter Island, Chile; National Mall, Washington, D.C.; Steve Osunsami at Bourbon Street-French Quarter in New Orleans, Louisiana; Connie Chung with Harry Connick Jr. at the Bellagio in Las Vegas, Nevada; Performance by Harry Connick Jr.: "Cry Me A River"; Telephone interview with Steve Case, CEO of America Online; Barry Serafin with Floyd Westerman at the Native American New Millennium First People's World’s Fair and Pow Wow in Tucson, Arizona; Cynthia McFadden at The Tropicana Nightclub in Havana, Cuba; Live look-in of performance by the Goo Goo Dolls at the MTV studios inside One Astor Plaza in Times Square, New York City; Highlights of the day narrated by Bob Brown; Taped performance by Christina Aguilera at the MTV studios inside One Astor Plaza in Times Square, New York City: "Genie in a Bottle"; Washington National Cathedral in Washington, D.C.: "Ode to Joy"; Cathedral of St. John the Divine in New York City; Live look-in of Faith Hill concert in Nashville, Tennessee
10:00 p.m.	3:00	Performance by Kenny G in Times Square, New York City: "Auld Lang Syne"; Kevin Newman at St. John's, Newfoundland, Canada; Live look-in of Bee Gees concert in Sunrise, Florida: "You Should Be Dancing"; Cynthia McFadden at The Tropicana Nightclub in Havana, Cuba; Terry Moran at the National Mall in Washington, D.C.; Performance at The Tropicana Nightclub in Havana, Cuba; Midnight (NST) with Kevin Newman at St. John's, Newfoundland, Canada; Jack Ford in Times Square, New York City; Peter Jennings with David Blaine at the Times Square Studios in New York City; Live look-in of Barry Manilow concert at the Foxwoods Resort Casino in Mashantucket, Connecticut; Peter Jennings & Robert Krulwich at the Times Square Studios in New York City; Peter Jennings with Mayor Rudy Giuliani at the Times Square Studios in New York City; Sam Donaldson at the Y2K Coordination Center in Washington, D.C.
11:00 p.m.	4:00	Connie Chung at the Bellagio in Las Vegas, Nevada; Telephone interview with Aprile Millo; Judy Muller with Cecil Williams at Union Square, San Francisco; Overture to the World; Deborah Roberts at the Millennium Celebration at Epcot at Walt Disney World near Orlando, Florida; Dick Clark at the Marriott Marquis hotel in Times Square in New York City; John Quiñones at South Beach in Miami, Florida; Terry Moran at the National Mall in Washington, D.C.; John Miller at the Midnight Run in Central Park, New York City; Dick Clark at the Marriott Marquis hotel in Times Square in New York City; Live look-in of Billy Joel concert at Madison Square Garden in New York City; Terry Moran at the National Mall in Washington, D.C.
12:00 a.m.	5:00	Midnight (EST) with Dick Clark in Times Square in New York City; Midnight (EST) at the National Mall in Washington, D.C.; Live look-in of Billy Joel concert at Madison Square Garden in New York City; Sam Donaldson at the Y2K Coordination Center in Washington, D.C.; Lisa Stark at the FAA Flight Operations Center in Herndon, Virginia; Look-in of Aerosmith concert at Osaka Dome in Osaka, Japan: "I Don't Want to Miss a Thing"; Telephone interview with Alan Alda; Midnight (EST) at Walt Disney World near Orlando, Florida
1:00 a.m.	6:00	Midnight (CST) with Carole Simpson at Grant Park in Chicago, Illinois; Midnight (CST) in Mexico City, Mexico; Midnight (CST) with Steve Osunsami in New Orleans, Louisiana; Look-in of Barbra Streisand concert in Las Vegas, Nevada: "The Way We Were"; Look-in of Elton John concert at Thomas & Mack Center, University of Nevada, Las Vegas; Jack Ford in Times Square, New York City; Performance by quartet Spank; Connie Chung with Paul Anka at the Bellagio in Las Vegas, Nevada; Look-in of Faith Hill concert in Nashville, Tennessee; Judy Muller at Union Square, San Francisco; Barry Serafin with Floyd Westerman at the Native American New Millennium First People's World’s Fair and Pow Wow in Tucson, Arizona
2:00 a.m.	7:00	Midnight (MST) with Neil Diamond at the Pepsi Center in Denver, Colorado; Performance: "Global Heartbeat Project"; Interview with centenarians; Jack Smith at the America Online Network Operations Center in Fairfax County, Virginia; The Bellagio in Las Vegas, Nevada; Look-in of Natalie Merchant concert at the John Anson Ford Amphitheatre in Los Angeles, California; Judy Muller at Union Square, San Francisco; Live look-in of Bonnie Raitt concert in San Rafael, California; Telephone interview with Willie Brown; Combined performance featuring The Acoustics and Spank: "The Lion Sleeps Tonight"
3:00 a.m.	8:00	Midnight (PST) with Connie Chung and mayor Oscar Goodman at the Bellagio in Las Vegas, Nevada; Midnight (PST) with Judy Muller at Union Square, San Francisco; Midnight (PST) at the Hollywood Sign in Hollywood, Los Angeles, California featuring Jay Leno; Midnight (PST) in Seattle, Washington; Highlights of the day narrated by Bob Brown; Jack Ford in Times Square, New York City; Look-in of Phish concert at the Big Cypress Reservation near Clewiston, Florida: "Heavy Things"; Look-in of Ray Charles concert in Clearwater, Florida; Look-in of James Taylor concert in Raleigh, North Carolina; Highlights with Aaron Brown; Millennium Dome at Greenwich Peninsula, London, England; Kenny G's "Auld Lang Syne"; Closing by Peter Jennings at the ABC News Times Square Studios in New York City; Sign-off at 3:59 a.m. EST with "Amazing Grace"
