= Dick Clark's New Year's Rockin' Eve =

American New Year's Eve television special

- Also known as: Three Dog Night's New Year's Rockin' Eve; Chicago's New Year's Rockin' Eve; Dick Clark's New Year's Rockin' Eve with Ryan Seacrest; Dick Clark's Primetime New Year's Rockin' Eve with Ryan Seacrest
- Created by: Dick Clark
- Presented by: Three Dog Night; George Carlin; Dick Clark; Ryan Seacrest
- Country of origin: United States
- Original language: English
- No. of episodes: 53

Production
- Executive producers: Ryan Seacrest; Allen Shapiro; Mike Mahan; Barry Adelman; Mark Bracco
- Producer: Larry Klein
- Production locations: Times Square, New York City, New York (live segments) various locations (pre-recorded concert segments)
- Camera setup: Multi-camera
- Running time: Primetime Part One: 120 minutes (8:00–10:00 p.m.); Primetime Part Two: 60 minutes (10:30–11:30 p.m.); Part One: 100 minutes (11:30 p.m.–1:10 a.m.); Part Two: 65 minutes (1:10–2:15 a.m.)
- Production companies: Dick Clark Productions (1972–present); Ryan Seacrest Productions (2011–present)

Original release
- Network: NBC (1972–1974); ABC (1974–present)
- Release: December 31, 1972 – present

Dick Clark's New Year's Rockin' Eve (NYRE), billed since 2008 as Dick Clark's New Year's Rockin' Eve with Ryan Seacrest, is a New Year's Eve television special broadcast by ABC. The special broadcasts primarily from New York City's Times Square and prominently features coverage of its annual ball drop event hosted by television personality Ryan Seacrest, along with live and pre-recorded musical performances by popular musicians from Times Square and Hollywood. Since 2016–17, the special has regularly included performances and coverage of midnight festivities from other U.S. locations, including New Orleans (Central Time, from 2017 to 2024), San Juan (Atlantic Time, from 2021 to 2022), and Las Vegas.

Its creator and namesake was television personality Dick Clark, who conceived New Year's Rockin' Eve as a youthful competitor to Guy Lombardo's popular and long-running New Year's Eve specials on CBS. The special first aired on December 31, 1972; its first two editions were broadcast by NBC, and hosted by Three Dog Night and George Carlin, respectively, with Clark anchoring coverage from Times Square. In 1974–75, the program moved to its permanent home on ABC, and Clark assumed the role of host. Since 2000–01, the special has broadcast segments in prime time alongside the main late-night broadcast; initially occupying the 10:00 p.m. ET/PT hour, from 2011–12 onward the special has occupied the entirety of ABC's primetime and late-night schedule on New Year's Eve.

Following the death of Guy Lombardo on November 5, 1977, and the decline of CBS's specials, New Year's Rockin' Eve grew in popularity and became the dominant New Year's special on American television. New Year's Rockin' Eve has consistently remained the highest-rated New Year's Eve special broadcast by the United States' major television networks; its 2012 edition peaked at 22.6 million home viewers, not including viewers watching from public locations, which were not yet measured by Nielsen at the time. The special was renewed through at least 2028–29 in November 2023.

Dick Clark hosted New Year's Rockin' Eve annually from 1972 through 2004. (Note: The 1999–2000 edition is excluded as ABC 2000 Today, which was a broadcast of ABC News, aired in its place and thus cannot be counted as an episode of Dick Clark's New Year's Rockin' Eve.) For 2000, Clark participated in ABC News' day-long ABC 2000 Today telecast, joining overall host Peter Jennings for coverage from Times Square. In December 2004, Clark suffered a stroke, which resulted in Regis Philbin serving as guest host. As Clark experienced lingering speech impediments from the stroke, Ryan Seacrest began serving as a host and executive producer the following year. Clark continued to make limited appearances as a co-host until his death on April 18, 2012. Hosting solo since the 2012–13 edition, Seacrest has been accompanied by various guest correspondents; since the 2023–24 edition, Rita Ora has served as a Times Square correspondent, while Jeannie Mai has hosted the Los Angeles-based concert segments.

== Format ==
New Year's Rockin' Eve is primarily broadcast from Times Square in New York City, providing coverage of the New Year's Eve festivities held there, and culminating with the long-running ball drop approaching midnight ET. Performances by popular musicians are featured throughout the special: most of these performances, currently billed as the "Billboard Hollywood Party", are pre-recorded from a studio in Los Angeles. The special has also featured live, headlining performances from a stage in Times Square, and has occasionally featured performances from other U.S. cities.

Since 2005, Ryan Seacrest has hosted the live show outside in Times Square, joined by a celebrity correspondent providing additional reports from attendees. From his return and until his death, Dick Clark hosted a limited number of segments from Times Square Studios throughout the broadcast, including the countdown (after which he traditionally kissed his wife Kari Wigton at midnight).

Since the 2000–01 edition, the special has begun with a segment in prime time, which was initially branded as Dick Clark's Primetime New Year's Rockin' Eve, and is currently billed for ratings purposes as "Primetime – Part 1". Initially airing at 10:00 p.m. ET/PT, the prime time block was extended to 8:00 p.m. ("Part I", with the remaining primetime block billed as "Part II") beginning with the 2011–12 edition. From 2011–12 to 2013–14, "Part I" primarily featured retrospective countdowns using archive footage from the Dick Clark Productions library, including the top New Year's Rockin' Eve performances of all-time (in honor of the special's 40th anniversary), and the top women in music.

Following a 30-minute break for late local programming (such as late-night newscasts), the second block of the program is broadcast, which begins at 10:30 p.m. ET/PT (previously at 11:30 p.m. until 2021–22), and features coverage of midnight celebrations in the Atlantic Time Zone from the U.S. territory of Puerto Rico at 10:59 p.m. ET and in the Eastern Time Zone from the Times Square ball drop at 11:59 p.m. ET. Until the addition of the prime time block, this segment served as the main block (and from 1997–98 onward, "Part I") of the entire Rockin' Eve telecast. From 2016–17 through 2022–23, the late-night block also featured coverage from the Jackson Square fleur-de-lis drop in New Orleans at midnight in the Central Time Zone; a Central Time segment from Chicago was introduced for the 2025–26 edition.

After the conclusion of coverage from Times Square, the show continues into its final block, which usually features the remainder of the pre-recorded concert segments. Debuting with the 2000–01 edition, the secondary late-night segment usually runs up to approximately 2:10 a.m. ET/PT, and has run as late as 4:00 a.m. ET/PT (2025–26).

== History ==
=== 1972–1975: Conception and premiere ===
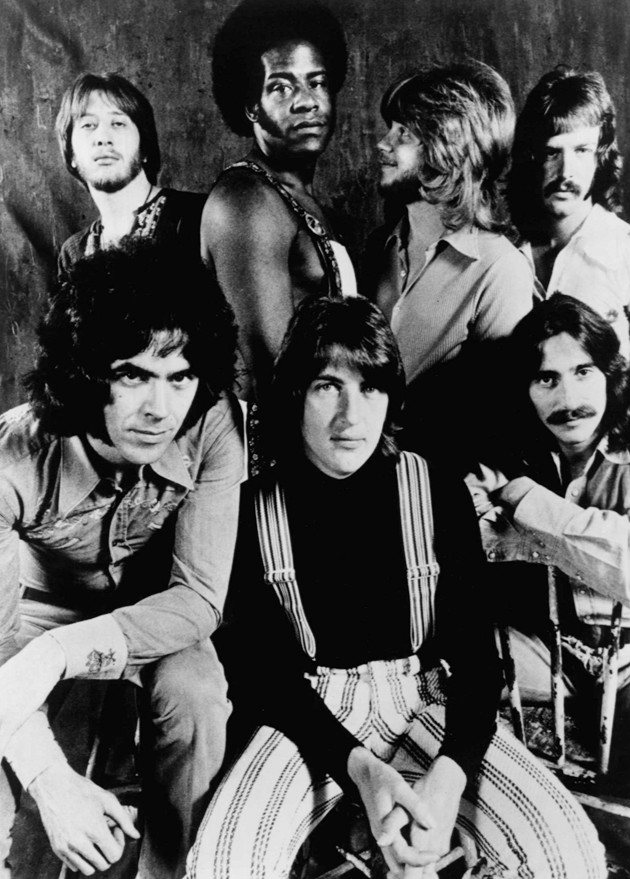
American-Irish rock band Three Dog Night hosted the first edition of New Year's Rockin' Eve in 1972.

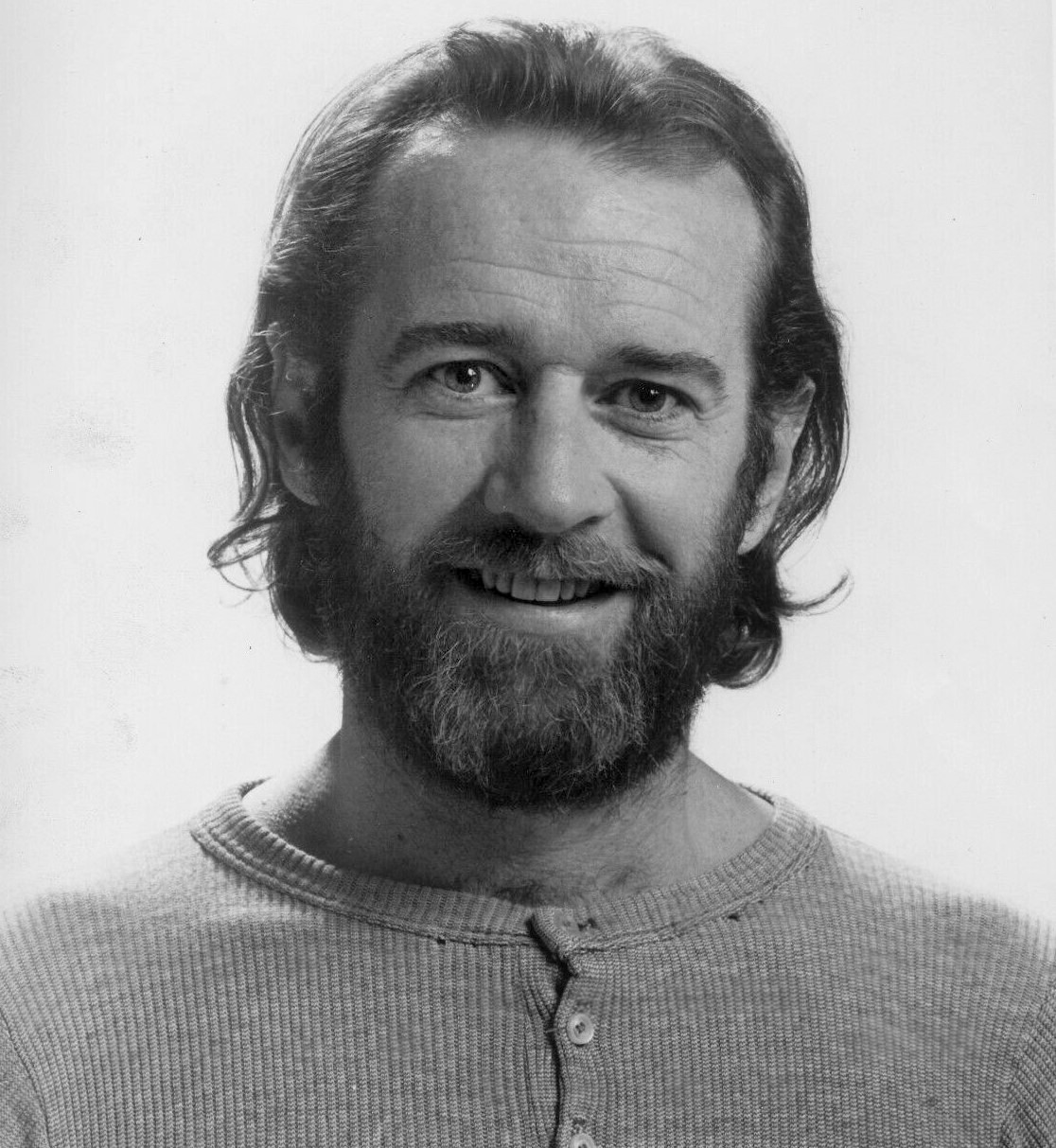
George Carlin hosted the second edition of New Year's Rockin' Eve in 1973.

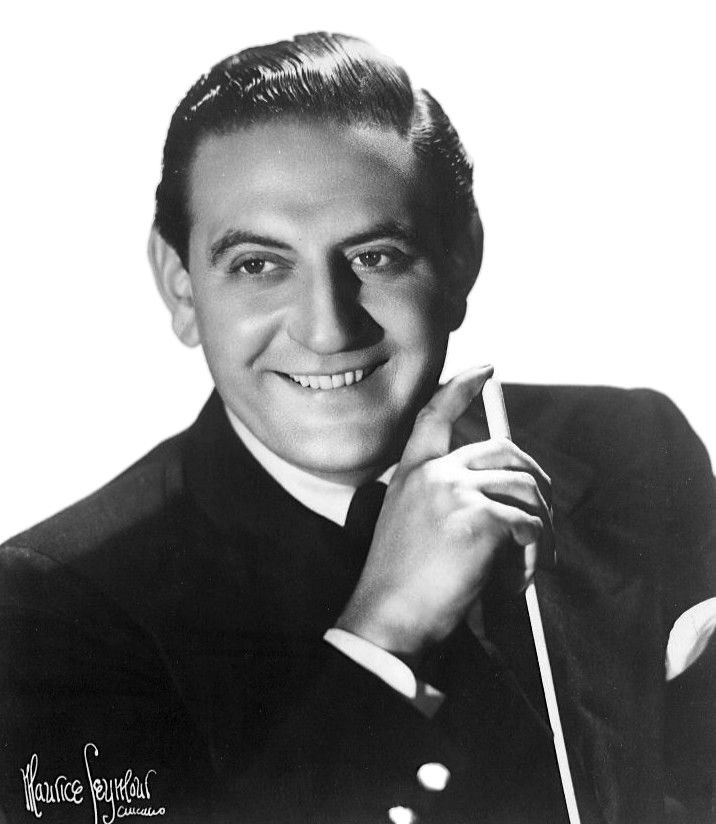
Guy Lombardo was a fixture on New Year's Eve until his death in 1977.

Prior to the premiere of New Year's Rockin' Eve, the most well-known New Year's Eve program was the annual big band remote of bandleader Guy Lombardo and his Royal Canadians, broadcast from the ballroom of the Waldorf-Astoria Hotel. Guy Lombardo hosted 48 straight New Year's Eve broadcasts on CBS until his death in 1977, beginning on radio in 1928 (and for a period, splitting with NBC Radio following midnight ET), and on CBS Television from 1956 to 1976 (which also featured coverage of the ball drop in Times Square). Lombardo was also well known for his band's performance of the song "Auld Lang Syne" at midnight, which helped make the standard synonymous with the New Year's holiday in North America.

At the time, Dick Clark was well known as the host of American Bandstand, a music program produced from the studios of Philadelphia television station WFIL-TV (now WPVI-TV) and broadcast by ABC. Bandstand itself aired a New Year's Eve special on December 31, 1959.

By the 1970s, Clark felt that Guy Lombardo's New Year's specials were outdated and did not appeal well to younger viewers; he believed that only older viewers would be interested in big band music accompanied by "people dancing cheek-to-jowl in their tuxedos and funny hats". In response, he decided to produce a more youthful New Year's Eve special of his own to compete. Clark's new program would be known as New Year's Rockin' Eve, a name chosen to signify the major contrast between his special and the more formal atmosphere of Guy Lombardo's special. The first edition was aired by NBC on December 31, 1972, titled Three Dog Night's New Year's Rockin' Eve, and was hosted by the members of the rock band Three Dog Night. The special featured pre-recorded musical performances from the ballroom of the Queen Mary in Long Beach, California by Helen Reddy, Billy Preston, and Three Dog Night. Clark served as a reporter from Times Square for live coverage of the ball drop and arrival of 1973.

The second special, New Year's Rockin' Eve '74, also on NBC, was hosted by comedian George Carlin and featured pre-recorded musical performances by The Pointer Sisters, Billy Preston, Linda Ronstadt and Tower of Power once again from the Queen Mary ballroom. Beginning with the 1974-75 edition, the program moved to ABC and Clark assumed hosting duties; billed as Chicago's New Year's Rockin' Eve 1975 and seen as part of ABC's Wide World of Entertainment late-night block, the first ABC edition was headlined by the rock band Chicago, with guests The Beach Boys, The Doobie Brothers, Herbie Hancock and Olivia Newton-John, in segments pre-recorded at MGM Studios in Hollywood.

=== 1976–1999: Rise in popularity ===
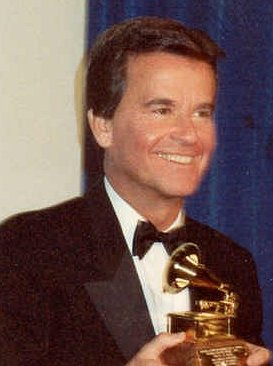
Dick Clark, creator, original host, and namesake of the show

Following Guy Lombardo's death in 1977, CBS and the Royal Canadians attempted to continue their New Year's Eve broadcasts from the Waldorf-Astoria for 1977–78. However, the effects of Lombardo's absence led to a decline in viewership, allowing New Year's Rockin' Eve to overtake the Royal Canadians in viewership in only its sixth year on-air. The threat of the new special also prompted CBS to discontinue the Royal Canadians special entirely in 1979 in favor of a new special, Happy New Year, America, which premiered for New Year's Eve 1979–80. With its recent success, Clark began hoping that New Year's Rockin' Eve would become a television tradition of its own, lamenting that "Lombardo would always win [in New York] because of the Waldorf and 35 years of tradition, but we finally got it wrested." Clark's hopes soon became reality, as New Year's Rockin' Eve had displaced Guy Lombardo as the most popular and most-watched New Year's Eve special on American television in the years following.

The 1980 edition was co-hosted by Erin Moran and John Schneider of Happy Days and The Dukes of Hazzard respectively, and continued with Clark's goal to showcase acts that represented the previous year by featuring Barry Manilow, Blondie, Chic, The Oak Ridge Boys, and the Village People as performers. The 1988 edition was co-hosted by China Beach cast members Marg Helgenberger and Brian Wimmer from the Cocoanut Grove club at the Ambassador Hotel. In 1990, New Year's Eve fell on a Monday; on that night, ABC was scheduled to broadcast a Monday Night Football game between the Los Angeles Rams and the New Orleans Saints. Fearing that his special would not be able to start on time (as ABC usually began its Monday Night Football coverage at the time at 9:00 p.m. ET, which regularly delayed local and network late-night programming), Clark asked ABC to move the game's start time one hour early to 8:00 p.m., so that Rockin' Eve would run at its normal time.

Mark Curry and Holly Robinson of the ABC sitcom Hangin' with Mr. Cooper co-hosted for 1993–94, with segments at Walt Disney World featuring performances by acts such as Brooks and Dunn and Kiss, along with the marriage of two California firefighters, Laura Turpin and Bob Hutnyan. The 1994–95 edition was co-hosted with Margaret Cho and Steve Harvey (then respectively starring in the ABC sitcoms All-American Girl and Me and the Boys, both of which would be cancelled by the end of that television season), and included musical performances from Melissa Etheridge, Hootie & the Blowfish and Salt-N-Pepa.

The 1996–97 edition was co-hosted by Stacey Dash and Donald Faison of the ABC comedy series Clueless, and included performances by Jann Arden, Kiss, "Weird Al" Yankovic, The Presidents of the United States of America, and The Tony Rich Project. This edition also marked the 25th anniversary of New Year's Rockin' Eve; Clark marked this accomplishment by discussing the greatest challenges he had faced hosting the special, including being unable to hear his director over the loud crowds in Times Square, harsh weather conditions, and a year where the host had to contend with a group of 30 naked attendees in the background. Clark aimed to continue hosting the special through the year 2000. Ultimately, Clark hosted the program nearly uninterrupted through 2004.

Following the 1997–98 edition, ABC aired a second, hour-long special at 1:05 a.m. ET, After New Year's Eve, which was hosted by David Sanborn and featured performances by Boz Scaggs, Isaac Hayes, Dr. John, Joan Osborne, Lou Reed, and Naughty by Nature. In later years, New Year's Rockin' Eve itself would be extended further into the night following the conclusion of coverage from New York.

=== ABC 2000 Today ===
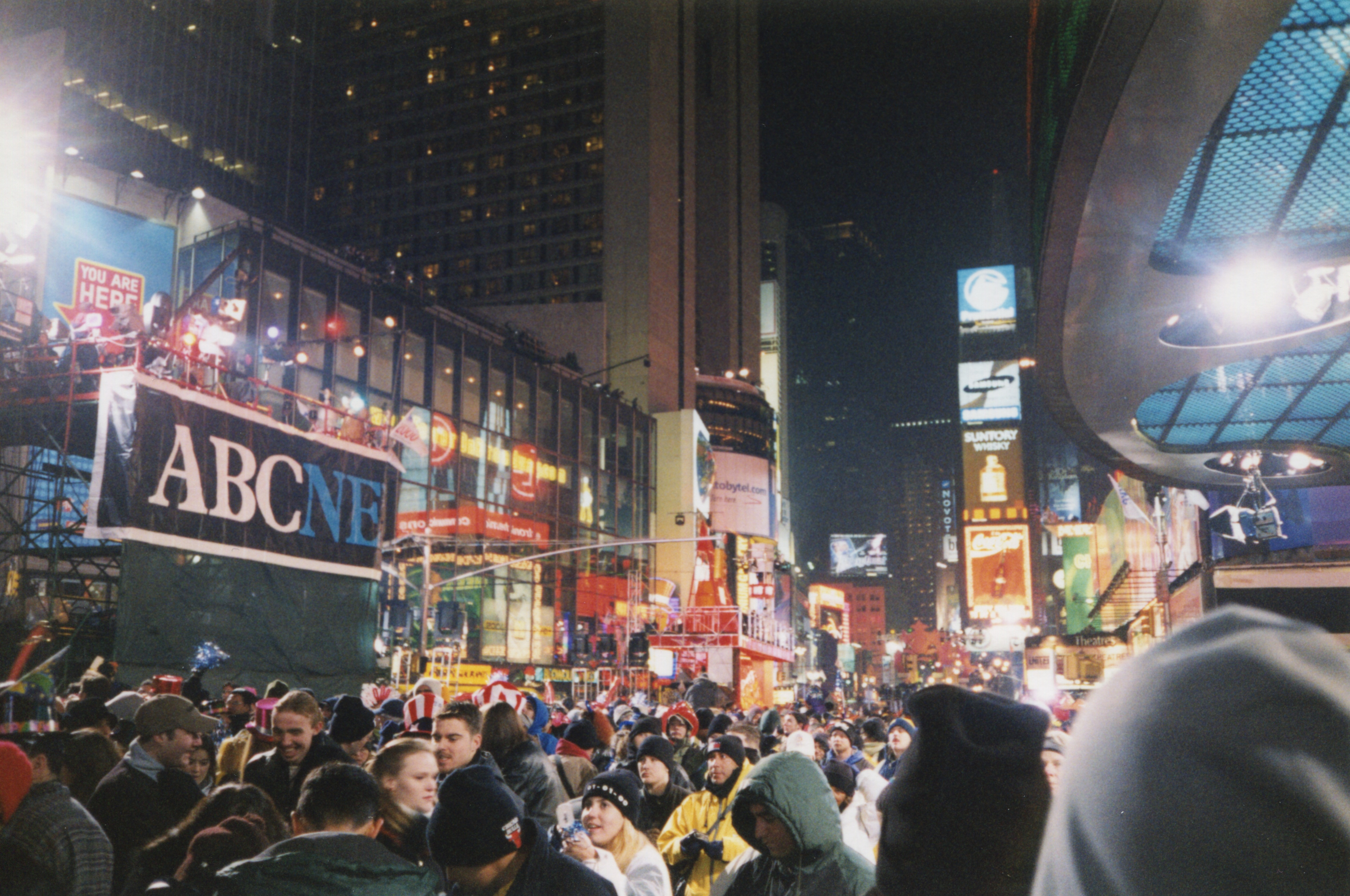
ABC News provided coverage from Times Square and other locations as part of its ABC 2000 Today special.

New Year's Rockin' Eve was placed on hiatus for 1999–2000 in favor of ABC 2000 Today, a day-long ABC News telecast anchored by Peter Jennings. ABC was part of a worldwide consortium of broadcasters, covering international and U.S. festivities celebrating the arrival of the year 2000. Dick Clark joined Jennings and Jack Ford as correspondents in Times Square. Clark served as one of the feature correspondents stationed around the world, along with Barbara Walters, Diane Sawyer, Charles Gibson, Cokie Roberts, Elizabeth Vargas, Connie Chung, Deborah Roberts, Carole Simpson, and Sam Donaldson, all under the direction of ABC's Roger Goodman. Clark contributed to the broadcast during the 11 p.m. hour (eastern), and reported on the Time Square Ball drop during the midnight hour.

At least 175 million viewers tuned into some portions of ABC 2000. The broadcast won two News and Documentary Emmy Awards, a Peabody Award, a TCA Award, and was nominated for a DGA Award. Reflecting on the event, Clark was enthusiastic about his participation, feeling that it was one of the biggest nights he had ever spent in Times Square.

=== 2001–2004: Primetime expansion ===
New Year's Rockin' Eve returned to ABC the following New Year's Eve for the arrival of 2001. The 2000–01 edition also introduced a new primetime hour at 10:00 p.m. ET/PT, which featured additional segments and music performances to lead into the main program. Clark felt positive about the program's expansion into primetime, believing that viewers, no matter where they were, wanted to know what was going on in Times Square on New Year's Eve. Clark was joined by Fox & Friends anchor Steve Doocy, and Madison Michelle as reporters in Times Square. Comedian Wayne Brady hosted concert segments in Hollywood, which included performances by 98 Degrees, Baha Men, Boyz II Men, Lonestar, and Third Eye Blind among others.

The 2002 edition of New Year's Rockin' Eve, its 29th edition, featured pre-recorded concert performances from tours by Aerosmith, Destiny's Child, and Elton John during the primetime hour, followed by studio segments (again hosted by Wayne Brady) featuring performances by Blink-182, Bush, Busta Rhymes, Jessica Simpson, LFO, The O'Jays, and Pink. The primetime hour of New Year's Rockin' Eve 2002 was also preceded by ABC 2002, a sequel to the ABC 2000 Today special hosted by Peter Jennings from the Rose Center for Earth and Space. The three-and-a-half-hour special featured a "meaningful and reflective" view on New Year's celebrations from around the world, and also included performances by Arlo Guthrie, Sting, and U2. Clark personally felt that 2002, since it was the first after the September 11 attacks, was the most "nerve-racking" New Year's Eve he had ever experienced.

=== 2005: Dick Clark's stroke and effects on Rockin' Eve ===
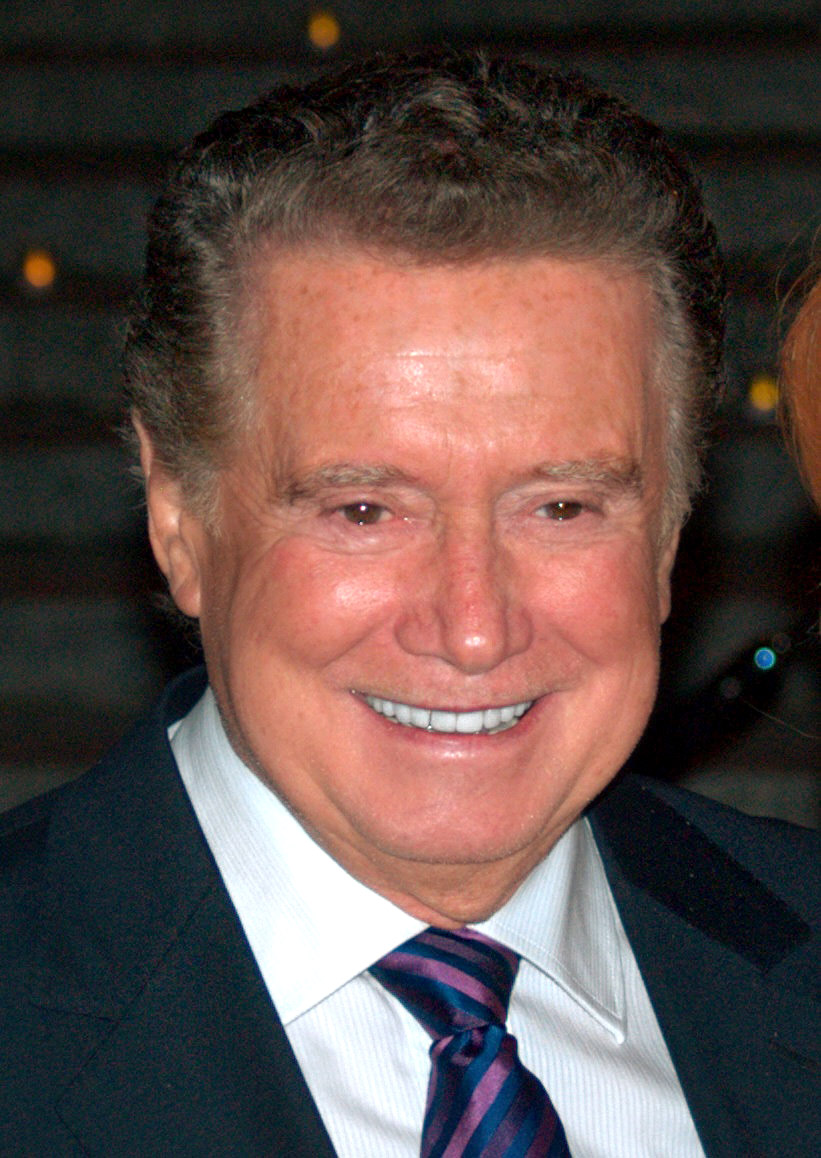
Regis Philbin filled in for Dick Clark during New Year's Rockin' Eve 2005.

On December 8, 2004, it was reported that Clark had been hospitalized after suffering from a minor stroke. Despite Clark indicating his participation in New Year's Rockin' Eve 2005 in a prepared statement, reports soon surfaced that the stroke may have been serious enough to prevent him from hosting at all. It was officially announced on December 14 that Dick Clark would not be hosting, and that Regis Philbin would fill in for Clark. In a statement, Clark said that he was thankful that Philbin was able to be appointed quickly on short notice to host the show, and hoped that he would do a good job. Philbin was optimistic about his role, considering it the "best temp job ever".

Various personalities paid tribute to Clark throughout the night; the New Year's Rockin' Eve broadcast featured special celebrity messages for Clark, and revelers in Times Square were seen with signs saluting Clark. During CNN's coverage, revelers in Times Square told CNN's Jason Carroll that Philbin did a decent job filling in for Clark. Mayor Michael Bloomberg spoke with Philbin on Clark's absence during the show, noting that "it isn't that we don't like Regis, but we want [Clark] back next year."

Philbin's hosting received mixed reviews: Richard Huff of the New York Daily News felt that he was "suitable–although not spectacular", was "stiff" at first, and suggested that he might have performed better if he had a co-host to interact with like his daytime talk show Live with Regis and Kelly. Virginia Heffernan of The New York Times believed that Philbin was feeling "surprisingly nervous" in his role at host, and felt that "rowdy crowds" (which Philbin chose to avoid by staying in the studio) and the success of Rod Stewart's music career (which Philbin pounced on to promote his new album, "When You're Smiling") were bothering him.

=== 2006: Dick Clark's return ===
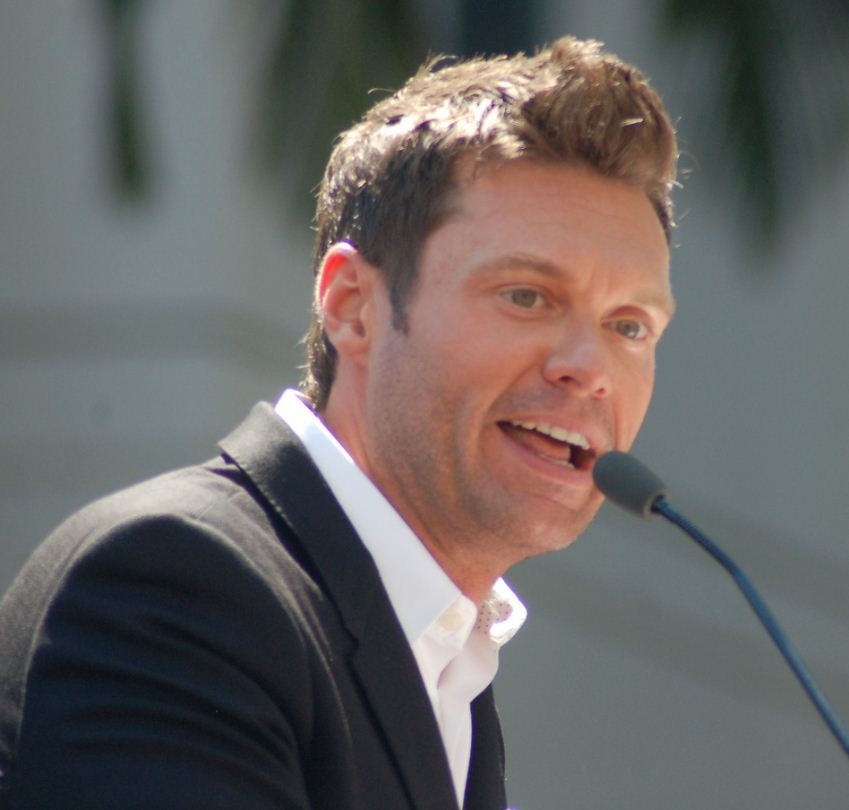
Ryan Seacrest joined New Year's Rockin' Eve as a co-host beginning on its 2006 edition.

In August 2005, ABC announced that Dick Clark would return to New Year's Rockin' Eve for its 2006 edition, marking his first television appearance since the stroke. For that broadcast, it was also announced Clark would be joined by a new co-host, media personality and American Idol host Ryan Seacrest. Seacrest had previously hosted Fox's competing New Year's Eve Live, which would be hosted by Philbin that year. Speaking to USA Today, Seacrest reminisced on having watched New Year's Rockin' Eve in his childhood, stating that "I knew when I was on other shows, I knew we weren't going to beat Dick Clark. He is New Year's Eve." As a part of a long-term deal with Dick Clark Productions, Seacrest also became an executive producer for the special. In an interview with People Magazine in December 2005, Seacrest revealed that while Clark had not completely recovered from the stroke, and that his speech was not exactly like how it was beforehand, Clark had made great progress since the original diagnosis.

For the 2005–06 special, actress and pop singer Hilary Duff hosted the Hollywood studio segments. The special was headlined by Mariah Carey, who gave the special's first-ever live performance from Times Square itself. While officials from the NYPD were initially wary of allowing the performance due to crowd control concerns, Times Square performances would become a regular feature of subsequent editions of New Year's Rockin' Eve.

During the program, Clark made limited on-air appearances, but still conducted his traditional countdown, and also recollected on his recent experiences:

Last year I had a stroke. It left me in bad shape. I had to teach myself how to walk and talk again. It's been a long, hard fight. My speech is not perfect but I'm getting there.

Public curiosity over Clark's condition and his return to television helped Dick Clark's New Year's Rockin' Eve 2006 draw in over 20 million viewers throughout the night, and score a 7.1 audience share among the key demographic of 18- to 49-year-olds. Reaction to Clark's appearance was mixed. While some television critics (including Tom Shales of The Washington Post, in an interview with the CBS Radio Network) felt he was not in good enough shape to do the broadcast, stroke survivors and many of Clark's fans praised the emcee for being a role model for people dealing with post-stroke recovery. The New York Times Brian Stelter compared Seacrest's new role as co-host of Rockin' Eve to being like a "traffic cop", "tossing to bands and correspondents and to Mr. Clark for the countdown".

=== 2007–2011: Ryan Seacrest becomes host ===
Following the 2006 edition, Dick Clark Productions announced that Seacrest had agreed to remain a host for future editions of New Year's Rockin' Eve. As he was still afflicted with speech impediments that resulted from dysarthria, a lingering effect of his stroke, Clark's role in the special was reduced; he continued to make limited studio appearances approaching midnight, while Seacrest hosted the majority of the program outside in Times Square.

The 2008 edition featured live performances from Times Square by Carrie Underwood, Miley Cyrus, and the Jonas Brothers. Fergie of the Black Eyed Peas hosted concert segments from Hollywood, which also featured performances by Akon, Natasha Bedingfield, Sean Kingston, OneRepublic, Plain White T's, Taylor Swift and will.i.am. Beginning with the 2009 edition, the program began to be billed as Dick Clark's New Year's Rockin' Eve with Ryan Seacrest. That year's edition featured live performances by the Jonas Brothers, Taylor Swift, and Lionel Richie, with Kellie Pickler serving as a correspondent. Hollywood segments featured performances by Fall Out Boy, Jesse McCartney, Natasha Bedingfield, Ne-Yo, The Pussycat Dolls, Solange, Robin Thicke and, will.i.am.

For its 2010 edition, headlining performances in Times Square included Daughtry, and Jennifer Lopez (who infamously wore a dark-colored catsuit for her performance to mixed reviews), while Melissa Rycroft served as a correspondent. Fergie hosted concert segments on-location from Las Vegas, Nevada, featuring performances by her group the Black Eyed Peas, Colbie Caillat, Robin Thicke, Keri Hilson, Selena Gomez, Justin Bieber, David Guetta, and Orianthi. American Idol season 8 runner-up Adam Lambert stated that he was also reportedly scheduled to perform, but was canceled from both Rockin' Eve and a scheduled appearance on fellow ABC program Jimmy Kimmel Live! in response to his controversial performance at the American Music Awards (which are also produced by Dick Clark Productions). Neither ABC nor Dick Clark Productions ever confirmed whether or not Lambert had been booked at all, however.

The 2011 edition featured live performances by Kesha, Taio Cruz and the supergroup NKOTBSB (the combined Backstreet Boys and New Kids on the Block), and actress Jenny McCarthy served as a reporter from Times Square. Fergie reprised her role as host for the pre-recorded Hollywood segments, which featured performances by Avril Lavigne (including the world premiere of "What the Hell", the lead single from her then-upcoming album Goodbye Lullaby), Natasha Bedingfield, Jennifer Hudson, Ne-Yo, Train, Mike Posner, Willow Smith, Jason Derülo, Far East Movement, La Roux, Kesha, and Drake. Viewership for the 2011 edition peaked at around 19 million viewers.

=== 2012: 40th anniversary ===
Seacrest (left) and Clark on the set of New Year's Rockin' Eve 2012. The 2012 edition marked Dick Clark's final appearance on the program before his death on April 18, 2012.

The 2011–12 edition was once again hosted by Seacrest, with Clark co-hosting what would become his final appearance on the program. Fergie co-hosted for the sixth consecutive year for the pre-taped Hollywood segments, while Jenny McCarthy returned for her second year corresponding from Times Square. Musical guests in Times Square included Lady Gaga (who also joined Mayor Michael Bloomberg in activating the ball drop), Justin Bieber, Pitbull and Hot Chelle Rae. Performers in the Hollywood segments included Taio Cruz, Nicki Minaj, Blink-182, Florence and the Machine, LMFAO, Gym Class Heroes, OneRepublic (at Disneyland), The Band Perry, will.i.am, Christina Perri, and Robin Thicke. To celebrate the 40th anniversary of the first edition of New Year's Rockin' Eve aired in 1972, the primetime portion of the show was preceded by a two-hour retrospective special focusing on memorable music performances from the show's history.

New Year's Rockin' Eve 2012 brought ABC's highest ratings on New Year's Eve since ABC 2000 Today; an average 8.4 million viewers watched the retrospective segment, the primetime hour brought in 12.9 million viewers, and the first hour of the main broadcast peaked at 22.6 million viewers. These numbers excluded viewership from locations such as bars and New Year's Eve parties, as Nielsen ratings did not account for out-of-home viewership at the time, as the company announced on October 24, 2016, that it would begin to offer out-of-home ratings data to broadcasters in April 2017.

=== 2013–2016: Death of Dick Clark and aftermath ===
On April 18, 2012, Dick Clark died after suffering a heart attack following surgery to fix an enlarged prostate. Neither ABC or Dick Clark Productions immediately commented on the future of the program.

In August 2012, ABC confirmed via a press release that New Year's Rockin' Eve would return for its 2012–13 edition. The primetime hour of this edition was preceded by a two-hour tribute special, New Year's Rockin' Eve Celebrates Dick Clark. Clark's legacy was also recognized by the Times Square Alliance, organizers of the ball drop: a triangular Waterford Crystal panel engraved with Dick Clark's name was presented to his widow Kari Wigton and installed on the ball.

On October 23, 2013, Dick Clark Productions confirmed the 2013–14 edition of New Year's Rockin' Eve, and announced that Ryan Seacrest had signed a multi-year deal of unspecified length to continue serving as host and executive producer of the special. Seacrest stated that he would "forever be both sentimental and grateful" about his involvement in the special, and that he was "excited to work together to create new traditions and fun moments on the show that only live television can deliver." Fellow producer Allen Shapiro credited Seacrest's involvement in New Year's Rockin' Eve for its "extended and expanded" success. That year, the special was aired in simulcast in Canada for first time by Citytv, replacing its coverage of concert festivities at Toronto's Nathan Phillips Square (the network's local station continued to sponsor the event, however). While viewership was down by 5%, New Year's Rockin' Eve was still the highest-rated among the New Year's specials.

On February 7, 2014, ABC announced that it had renewed New Year's Rockin' Eve through 2024. The 2016 edition featured One Direction's final U.S. television appearance before their planned hiatus. That year, New Year's Rockin' Eve was once again the highest rated of the New Year's Eve specials across the major networks; for the late-night portion, while overall household viewership was down by 7%, ratings in the 18–49 demographic were up by 3%.

=== 2017–2020: New Orleans expansion, Mariah Carey incident and return ===
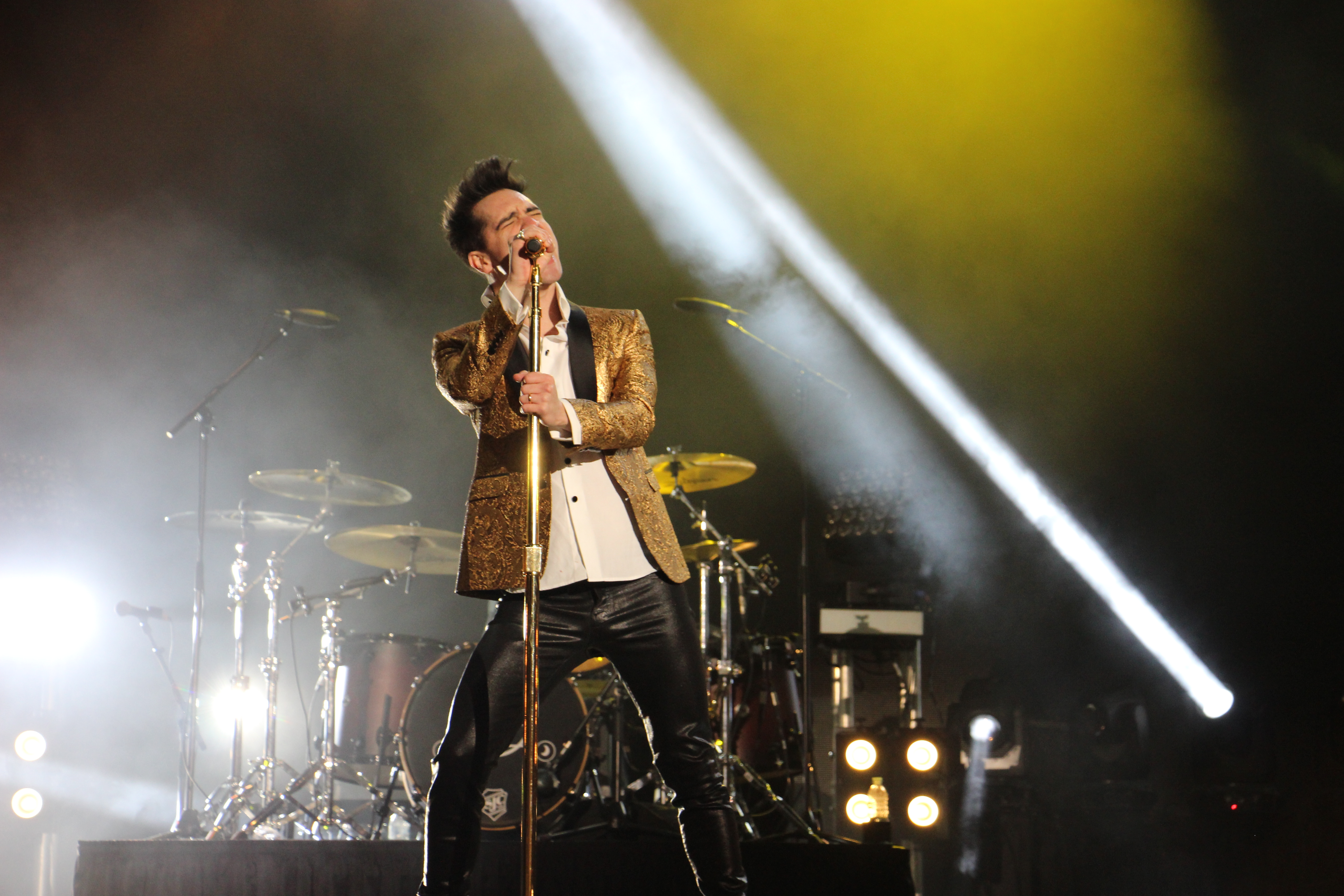
Panic! at the Disco rehearsing for their performance for the Allstate Fan Fest in New Orleans, which was featured during New Year's Rockin' Eve 2017.

The 2017 edition expanded to feature coverage of New Year's Eve festivities in New Orleans hosted by Lucy Hale, with performances by Jason Derulo and Panic! at the Disco from the Sugar Bowl's Allstate Fan Fest concert, and Jackson Square's fleur-de-lis drop at midnight in the Central Time Zone. The segments were subsidized by New Orleans and the state of Louisiana as a means of promoting tourism. While household ratings for the late-night portion of the broadcast were down by 9% in comparison to 2016, New Year's Rockin' Eve was once again the highest-rated New Year's special across the major networks, with a 9.0 rating in metered markets, and a 6.8 rating among adults 18–49.

Mariah Carey was one of the Times Square headliners for the 2017 edition. Her performance was notably marred by technical issues; when opening with "Emotions", Carey remarked throughout the song that she was unable to hear her backing track. On her second song, "We Belong Together", she briefly sang the song with a backing track before abruptly stopping. A representative of the singer claimed that Carey had alerted production staff that her in-ear monitors were not working, but that they refused to address the situation, and alleged that they were "[setting] her up to fail". Dick Clark Productions denied any wrongdoing, stating that they "had no involvement" in the incident, and that the allegations by Carey's management that they had intentionally sabotaged her performance were "defamatory, outrageous and frankly absurd".

New Jersey's Casino Reinvestment Development Authority (CRDA) had announced plans for a live performance from Atlantic City's Boardwalk Hall by an unannounced artist, but these plans were canceled, citing "scheduling conflicts and other considerations". The Philadelphia Inquirer reported that the CRDA's contract to host the DCP-produced Miss America pageant in Atlantic City contained provisions allowing "promotional accommodations" for the city in other DCP-produced programming, such as New Year's Rockin' Eve and the Billboard Music Awards. Robert Mulcahy, chairman of the board for the CRDA, explained that Live Nation (which was to fund the broadcast using cash left over from canceled beach concerts) were unable to find an act that met the approval of DCP, and added that local casinos declined to fund the performance, as they preferred to host their own parties rather than book major acts.

Despite the previous year's incident, Carey was subsequently invited to perform in Times Square again for New Year's Rockin' Eve 2018, in what media outlets described as an attempt at "redemption". The 2018 edition saw major ratings gains, especially in primetime; the 8:00–10:00 p.m. primetime segment reached 10.5 million viewers with a 3.1/13 rating among 18–49, and the 10:00 p.m. hour reached 15.7 million viewers and a 5.0/20 rating among 18–49, the highest ratings to date for the 10:00 p.m. segment. New Year's Rockin' Eve's only major competitor on English-language network television was Fox's inaugural New Year's Eve with Steve Harvey, as NBC was committed to air Sunday Night Football if the NFL shifted a Week 17 game with playoff implications into primetime (however, the NFL decided against doing so, and NBC aired rerun programming in primetime instead).

On November 13, 2018, it was announced that YouTube Music would be a presenting sponsor of the 2019 edition. The service is also presenting sponsor of the DCP-produced American Music Awards. With the return of NBC's New Year's Eve after a hiatus, the 2019 edition experienced a decline in ratings to an 8.3 household share for its late-night portion, but was once again the top-rated among the New Year's specials.

On October 7, 2019, Jenny McCarthy stated on Live with Kelly and Ryan that she would not appear as the Times Square correspondent for the 2020 edition of New Year's Rockin' Eve, citing a desire to spend the holiday with her family, and her commitments to season 3 of Fox's The Masked Singer. Lucy Hale would serve as Times Square correspondent in place of McCarthy, while Billy Porter of the FX series Pose hosted the New Orleans segments in place of Hale, and also performed his song "Love Yourself". Ciara again hosted the Hollywood concert segments. Longtime ABC News journalist Barbara Walters (via file footage) and other ABC personalities also played into a social media meme involving her longtime intro to the ABC newsmagazine 20/20, by noting in a segment that "This is 2020". The broadcast also introduced a sponsored segment featuring a "first millionaire of 2020" promotion by the Powerball lottery.

=== 2021–present: Puerto Rico, Las Vegas and Chicago expansions ===
Hale and Porter returned as Times Square correspondents for the 2021 edition. Cyndi Lauper performed a duet with Porter, who had been a cast member for her Broadway musical Kinky Boots. Due to the COVID-19 pandemic, both the Times Square and New Orleans celebrations televised by the special were held with no public attendance (with the former featuring a limited audience of essential workers and their families). The special featured an on-air interview between Seacrest and then-president-elect Joe Biden and his wife Jill Biden. Big Freedia hosted the New Orleans segments of the special.

In December 2020, it was reported that Mayor of New Orleans LaToya Cantrell had sent a letter to DCP requesting that Lauren Daigle (a Christian singer from Louisiana who had seen recent success as a pop crossover) not appear as a New Orleans-based performer for the special, citing her recent guest appearance during a worship event organized by Sean Feucht that was not approved by the city, and violated COVID-19-related public health orders. After criticism of the letter by state lieutenant governor Billy Nungesser (who maintained that Daigle had mistaken it for a legitimate event), a DCP staff member told The Times-Picayune/The New Orleans Advocate that Daigle had not actually been booked at all.

On December 16, 2021, it was announced that Seacrest had signed a multi-year extension with DCP's parent company MRC to continue his role as host and EP of New Year's Rockin' Eve. (MRC discontinued Dick Clark Productions as a studio imprint in September 2021, and moved all of its productions under the MRC Live & Alternative banner; this change was reversed after the MRC/Eldridge merger was reversed in 2022).

The 2022 edition, which marked the 50th anniversary of the first edition of New Year's Rockin' Eve, added coverage from the U.S. territory of Puerto Rico, consisting of segments from Distrito T-Mobile in San Juan, Puerto Rico hosted by Roselyn Sánchez and headlined by rapper Daddy Yankee, and the special's first broadcast of midnight celebrations in the Atlantic Time Zone to conclude the primetime block at 11:00 p.m. ET. Billy Porter returned as host of the New Orleans segments, while Liza Koshy reported from Times Square. D-Nice also made guest appearances for the Los Angeles segments alongside Ciara. While LL Cool J was originally announced as one of the headlining acts in Times Square, he withdrew on December 29 due to a COVID-19 infection. Chlöe also withdrew from the special for unspecified reasons. On December 31, ABC announced that Karol G canceled her appearance, but that Ashanti and Ja Rule had also joined the lineup.

ABC confirmed that Koshy, Porter, Ciara, and D-Nice would all return in their respective roles for the 2023 edition. To promote its then-upcoming "100 Years of Wonder" events for The Walt Disney Company's centennial year, concert segments were also filmed at Disneyland in Anaheim. The special also returned to Puerto Rico, with Farruko as featured performer and Dayanara Torres as host. In a major change in scheduling emulating what NBC implemented the previous year for its newly-introduced special Miley's New Year's Eve Party, "Part 1" of the primetime block now ended at 10:00 p.m. ET/PT rather than 11:00, and resumed with "Part 2" from 10:30—11:30 p.m. ET/PT, which included the Atlantic Time countdown from San Juan. The 11:30 p.m.—12:36 a.m. block containing the Times Square ball drop was now billed as "Part 1" of the late-night broadcast. (Note: In certain markets where a local ABC station produced a prime time newscast for a non-Big Three (Fox, CW, MyNetworkTV or independent) station or digital subchannel (including MeTV subchannels of selected Hearst-owned ABC stations), the reconfiguration of the New Year's Rockin' Eve: Primetime slots resulted in their live late newscasts being simulcast on those outlets.) ABC finished first overall in total and key demographic audience share, but average viewership saw a decline, with the primetime segment falling from 6.8 million to 5.2 million viewers, and part 1 of the late-night portion falling from 19.6 million to 13.2 million viewers.

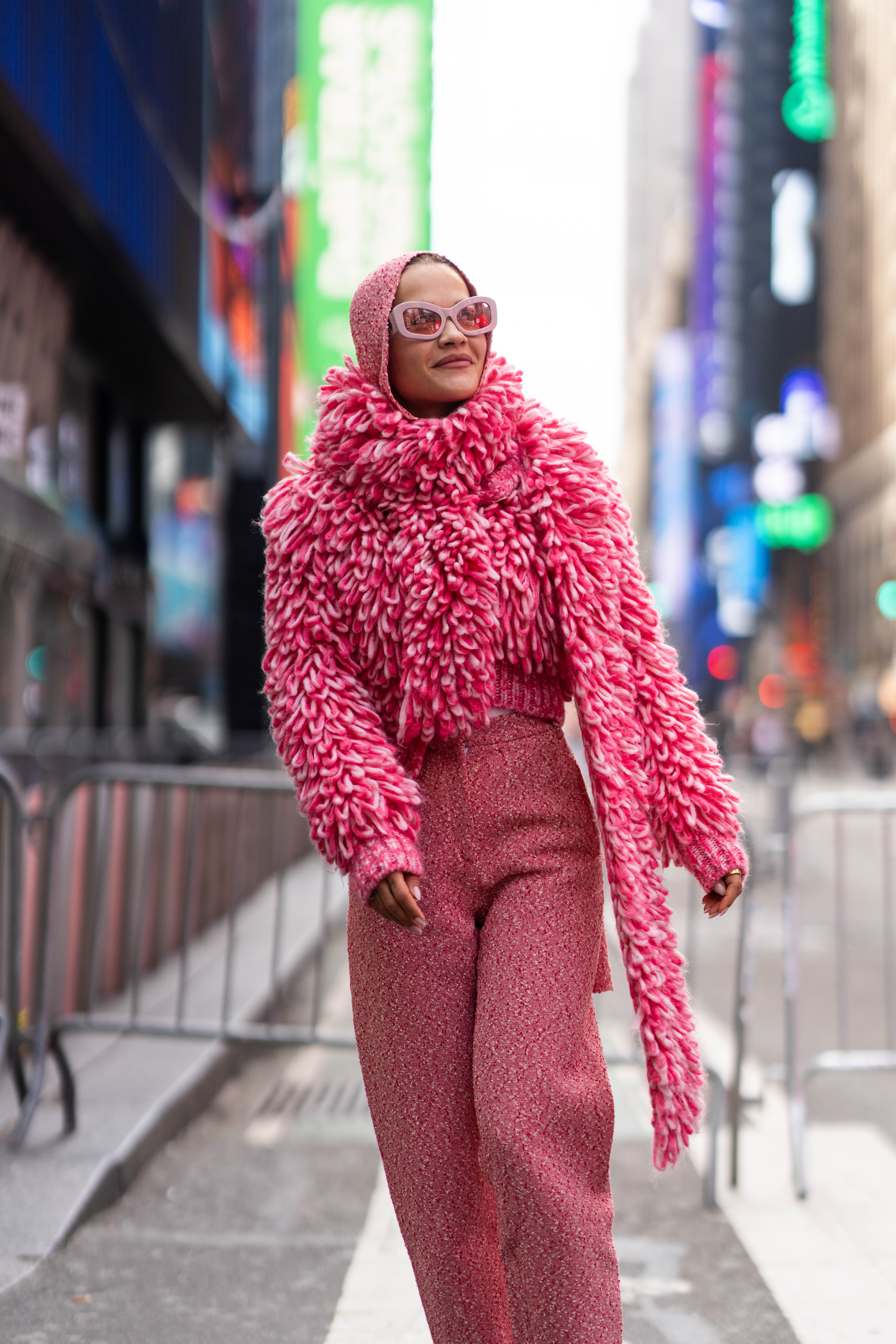
In 2024, Rita Ora joined the special as a Times Square correspondent.

On November 20, 2023, ABC and Dick Clark Productions announced that it had renewed New Year's Rockin' Eve through 2028–29. The 2023–24 edition featured several major changes: Rita Ora was announced as the new Times Square co-host, with Jeannie Mai now hosting the Hollywood segments. The New Orleans segments and Central Time festivities were discontinued due to low local tourism and municipal subsidies to fund the segments. An audio simulcast of the special was also carried by iHeartMedia hot adult contemporary and top 40 stations, as an extension of the company's recent partnership with ABC to broadcast its iHeartRadio Music Festival and Jingle Ball Tour specials (Seacrest also hosts two nationally-syndicated radio shows distributed by iHeartMedia, American Top 40 and On Air with Ryan Seacrest). Ratings improved over 2023, with the primetime block averaging 7.03 million viewers (but notably being beaten by CBS's New Year's Eve Live: Nashville's Big Bash, which drew 8.31 million during that block through an NFL lead-in), and 18 million for part 1 of the late-night portion (peaking at 22 million near midnight).

The 2025 edition, Seacrest's 20th as host, featured segments from Las Vegas in partnership with MGM Resorts, hosted by Rob Gronkowski. The 2025–26 edition also reinstated Central Time segments, which were co-hosted from Chicago by Chance the Rapper. Julianne Hough joined Gronkowski as a co-host for the Las Vegas segments. In addition, the late-night portion of the special was extended to 4:00 a.m. ET; at eight hours in total, it was the longest runtime for a New Year's Rockin' Eve telecast to date.

On October 7, 2026, ABC announced that Ora, Hough, and Gronkowski would all return for the 2026–27 edition, with Druski hosting from Chicago. It was also announced that the special will be simulcast by Disney+.

== Specials ==
No.	Title	Original release date	U.S. viewers (millions)
1	"1973"	December 31, 1972	N/A
2	"1974"	December 31, 1973	N/A
3	"1975"	December 31, 1974	N/A
4	"1976"	December 31, 1975	N/A
5	"1977"	December 31, 1976	N/A
6	"1978"	December 31, 1977	N/A
7	"1979"	December 31, 1978	N/A
8	"1980"	December 31, 1979	N/A
9	"1981"	December 31, 1980	N/A
10	"1982"	December 31, 1981	N/A
11	"1983"	December 31, 1982	N/A
12	"1984"	December 31, 1983	N/A
13	"1985"	December 31, 1984	N/A
14	"1986"	December 31, 1985	N/A
15	"1987"	December 31, 1986	N/A
16	"1988"	December 31, 1987	N/A
17	"1989"	December 31, 1988	N/A
18	"1990"	December 31, 1989	N/A
19	"1991"	December 31, 1990	N/A
20	"1992"	December 31, 1991	N/A
21	"1993"	December 31, 1992	N/A
22	"1994"	December 31, 1993	N/A
23	"1995"	December 31, 1994	N/A
24	"1996"	December 31, 1995	N/A
25	"1997"	December 31, 1996	N/A
26	"1998"	December 31, 1997	N/A
27	"1999"	December 31, 1998	N/A
28	"2001"	December 31, 2000	N/A
29	"2002"	December 31, 2001	N/A
30	"2003"	December 31, 2002	N/A
31	"2004"	December 31, 2003	N/A
32	"2005"	December 31, 2004	N/A
33	"2006"	December 31, 2005	N/A
Headliners: Mariah Carey; Hollywood acts: 3 Doors Down, Sean Paul, Chris Brown and Hilary Duff
34	"2007"	December 31, 2006	N/A
Headliners: Christina Aguilera; Hollywood acts: Rihanna, Natasha Bedingfield, Meat Loaf, RBD and Fergie
35	"2008"	December 31, 2007	N/A
Headliners: Carrie Underwood, Miley Cyrus and Jonas Brothers; Hollywood acts: Akon, Avril Lavigne, Sean Kingston and Fergie
36	"2009"	December 31, 2008	N/A
Headliners: Taylor Swift, Jonas Brothers and Lionel Richie; Hollywood acts: The Pussycat Dolls, Fall Out Boy, Jesse McCartney, Natasha Bedingfield, Ne-Yo, Solange, Robin Thicke and will.i.am
37	"2010"	December 31, 2009	N/A
Headliners: Jennifer Lopez and Daughtry; Las Vegas acts: Black Eyed Peas, Colbie Caillat, Jason Derulo, Keri Hilson, Orianthi, Justin Bieber and Selena Gomez & the Scene
38	"2011"	December 31, 2010	N/A
Headliners: Kesha and Taio Cruz; Hollywood acts: New Kids on the Block, Backstreet Boys, Drake, Far East Movement, Jennifer Hudson, La Roux, Mike Posner, Train and Willow Smith
39	"2012"	December 31, 2011	N/A
Headliners: Lady Gaga, Justin Bieber, Pitbull and Hot Chelle Rae; Hollywood acts: Nicki Minaj, LMFAO, Florence + The Machine, Gym Class Heroes, The Band Perry and Christina Perri
40	"2013"	December 31, 2012	N/A
Headliners: PSY, Taylor Swift, Carly Rae Jepsen and Neon Trees; Hollywood acts: Justin Bieber, Big Sean, Pitbull, Flo Rida, Brandy, Ellie Goulding, Karmin, The Wanted and Greyson Chance
41	"2014"	December 31, 2013	7.52 (8–10 pm) / 12.18 (10–11 pm) / 22.8 (11:30 pm–12:37 am) / 7.0 (1:09–2:07 am)
Headliners: Blondie, Icona Pop, Macklemore and Ryan Lewis, and Miley Cyrus.; Hollywood acts: Ariana Grande, Capital Cities, Daughtry, Fall Out Boy, The Fray, Enrique Iglesias, Jason Derülo, Jennifer Hudson, and Robin Thicke.; Additional acts: Billy Joel from Barclays Center; Pitbull from Miami.
42	"2015"	December 31, 2014	8.23 (8–10 pm) / 12.93 (10–11 pm)
Headliners: Magic!, Idina Menzel, Florida Georgia Line, and Taylor Swift.; Hollywood acts: Bastille, Charli XCX, Fergie, Iggy Azalea, Meghan Trainor, One Direction, Pentatonix, Ella Henderson, and Rixton.; Additional acts: Gavin DeGraw and Lady Antebellum from Nashville and Elton John from Barclays Center.
43	"2016"	December 31, 2015	8.13 (8–10 pm) / 13.02 (10–11 pm)
Headliners: Carrie Underwood, Demi Lovato, Luke Bryan, Wiz Khalifa and Charlie Puth.; Hollywood acts: Alessia Cara, Andy Grammer, DNCE, Ellie Goulding, Elle King, Fall Out Boy, Macklemore and Ryan Lewis, Nathan Sykes, Nick Jonas, Omi, One Direction, Pentatonix, Rachel Platten, Tove Lo, and Walk the Moon.; Additional acts: Jimmy Buffett from Barclays Center.
44	"2017"	December 31, 2016	6.52 (8–10 pm)/ 11.6 (10–11 pm) / 20.3 (11:30 pm–12:33 am) / 7.2 (1:09–2:07 am)
Headliners: DNCE, Gloria Estefan and the cast of On Your Feet!, Mariah Carey, and Thomas Rhett.; Hollywood acts: Alessia Cara, Fifth Harmony, Flo Rida and Macy Kate, G-Eazy, Lukas Graham, Niall Horan, Martin Garrix, John Legend, Shawn Mendes, Mike Posner, Bebe Rexha, Emeli Sandé and Hailee Steinfeld; New Orleans acts: Jason Derulo and Panic! at the Disco; Additional acts: Demi Lovato from Sint Maarten and Lionel Richie from Las Vegas.
45	"2018"	December 31, 2017	10.52 (8–10 pm) / 15.80 (10–11 pm) / 25.6 (11:30 pm–12:31 am)
Headliners: Camila Cabello, Mariah Carey, Nick Jonas, and Sugarland.; Hollywood acts: Alesso, BTS, Fitz and the Tantrums, Kane Brown, Kelly Clarkson, Khalid, Marshmello, Zedd, Alessia Cara, Florida Georgia Line, Bebe Rexha, Portugal. the Man, Hailee Steinfeld, G Eazy, Halsey, Shawn Mendes and Charlie Puth; New Orleans acts: Imagine Dragons and Walk the Moon; Additional acts: Britney Spears from the Piece of Me residency in Las Vegas
46	"2019"	December 31, 2018	7.96 (8–10 pm) / 11.52 (10–11 pm)
Headliners: Christina Aguilera, Bastille, Dan + Shay and New Kids on the Block.; Hollywood acts: Bazzi, Camila Cabello, The Chainsmokers, Charlie Puth, Ciara, Dua Lipa, Ella Mai, Foster the People, Halsey, Kane Brown, Kelsea Ballerini, Lauren Alaina, Macklemore, Skylar Grey, Shawn Mendes and Weezer; New Orleans acts: Florida Georgia Line and Maren Morris; Additional acts: Post Malone from Barclays Center.
47	"2020"	December 31, 2019	7.32 (8–10 pm) / 10.82 (10–11 pm) / 17.8 (11:30 pm–12:33 am) / 5.7 (1:09–2:07 am)
Headliners: Alanis Morissette and the cast of Jagged Little Pill, BTS, Post Malone and Sam Hunt; Hollywood acts: Paula Abdul, Kelsea Ballerini, Blanco Brown, Dan + Shay, Green Day, Dua Lipa, Ava Max, Megan Thee Stallion, Anthony Ramos, Salt-N-Pepa, and Shaed; New Orleans acts: Sheryl Crow and Usher; Additional acts: Jonas Brothers from Miami
48	"2021"	December 31, 2020	8.35 (8–10 pm) / 11.22 (10–11 pm) / 18.4 (11:30 pm–12:31 am) / 5.4 (1:09–2:06 am)
Headliners: Jimmie Allen, Cyndi Lauper and Billy Porter Machine Gun Kelly, and Jennifer Lopez; New Orleans acts: Big Freedia and PJ Morton; Other acts: Nelly, Miley Cyrus, Brandy Norwood, Lewis Capaldi, En Vogue, Megan Thee Stallion, Doja Cat, Ella Mai, Maluma, and Saweetie
49	"2022"	December 31, 2021	5.8 (8–10pm) / 8.8 (10–11pm) / 19.6 (11:30pm–12:31am) / 5.6 (1:09–2:06am)
Headliners: Ashanti, Ja Rule, and Journey; Puerto Rico acts: Daddy Yankee; New Orleans acts: Billy Porter; Hollywood acts: OneRepublic, Avril Lavigne with Travis Barker, Macklemore & Ryan Lewis with Windser, Walker Hayes, Polo G, Masked Wolf, Mae Muller, Måneskin, French Montana, Don Omar with Nio García, Big Boi with Sleepy Brown, Daisy the Great, and AJR
50	"2023"	December 31, 2022	5.2 (8–10pm) / 7.9 (10:30–11:30pm) / 13.7 (11:30pm–12:36am) / 4.2 (1:09–2:13am)
Headliners: Duran Duran, Jax, J-Hope, and New Edition; Puerto Rico acts: Farruko; New Orleans acts: Billy Porter; Disneyland Resort acts: Aly & AJ, Bailey Zimmerman, Ciara, Ben Platt, Fitz and the Tantrums, Halle Bailey, Lauren Spencer-Smith, Maddie & Tae, Shaggy, and TXT; Hollywood acts: Armani White, Betty Who, Dove Cameron, Finneas O'Connell, Nicky Youre, and Wiz Khalifa
51	"2024"	December 31, 2023	7.0 (8–10pm) / 10.4 (10:30–11:30pm) / 18.0 (11:30pm–12:37am) / 5.1 (1:09–2:07am)
Headliners: LL Cool J, Jelly Roll, Jessie Murph, Megan Thee Stallion, Sabrina Carpenter, and Tyla; Hollywood acts: Aqua, Chic with Nile Rodgers, Doechii, Ellie Goulding, Green Day, Janelle Monáe, Loud Luxury with Two Friends and Bebe Rexha, Ludacris, Paul Russell, Reneé Rapp with Coco Jones, and Thirty Seconds to Mars; Las Vegas acts: Post Malone; Miami acts: Cardi B; Puerto Rico acts: Ivy Queen; South Korean acts: NewJeans
52	"2025"	December 31, 2024	6.30 (8–10pm) / 9.56 (10:30–11:30pm) / 17.9 (11:30pm–12:29am)
Times Square Performers: Carrie Underwood, TLC, Megan Moroney, Jonas Brothers, Sophie Ellis-Bextor, and Rita Ora; West Coast Party Performers: Alanis Morissette with Reneé Rapp, Dasha, DJ Cassidy's Pass The Mic Live! starring Ja Rule and Fat Joe and Slick Rick and Doug E. Fresh, Ernest, Hardy, Kesha, Laufey, Natasha Bedingfield, T-Pain, Teddy Swims, Thomas Rhett, and Tinashe; Las Vegas Performers: Blake Shelton, Lenny Kravitz, Cody Johnson, Blue Man Group and Jabbawockeez; West Virginia Performers: Oliver Anthony; Puerto Rico Performers: Luis Fonsi; Sydney Performers: Robbie Williams; London Performers: Jungle
53	"2026"	December 31, 2025	7.7 (8–10pm) / 11.3 (10:30–11:30pm) / 19.5 (11:30pm–12:28am) / 8.4 (12:29am–1:52am)
Times Square acts: Ciara, Diana Ross, Le Sserafim, Little Big Town, Maren Morris; Los Angeles acts: 4 Non Blondes, 50 Cent, 6lack, BigXthaPlug, Charlie Puth, Demi Lovato, DJ Cassidy's Pass The Mic Live! Starring Busta Rhymes, T.I., and Wyclef Jean, Goo Goo Dolls, Jess Glynne, Jessie Murph, Jordan Davis, Leon Thomas, Lil Jon, Madison Beer, OneRepublic, Rick Springfield, Russell Dickerson, Tucker Wetmore, Zara Larsson; Las Vegas acts: AJR, HUNTR/X (EJAE, Audrey Nuna & Rei Ami), Mariah Carey, New Kids on the Block, Pitbull and Filmore, The All-American Rejects; Other performers: Daddy Yankee (from Puerto Rico), Chance the Rapper (from Chicago), Chappell Roan (from Kansas City), Post Malone (from Nashville)
54	"2027"	December 31, 2026	TBD
55	"2028"	December 31, 2027	TBD
56	"2029"	December 31, 2028	TBD
57	"2030"	December 31, 2029	TBD

== Depictions in other media ==
As New Year's Rockin' Eve gained prominence in American pop culture as an annual mainstay, Clark made appearances in other television series and films to reference his role.

During a Y2K-themed short in The Simpsons' 1999 Halloween special "Treehouse of Horror X", Clark made a cameo appearance hosting a New Year's Eve event in Springfield. In a satirical nod to his perennially youthful appearance, the Y2K bug causes the host to melt and expose him as actually being a robot. In a commentary with one of the episode's writers, Ron Hauge, for the show's season 11 DVD release, Clark said that the episode received the "biggest response" he had ever gotten from anything he had ever done. Clark also made an appearance during the pilot episode of fellow Matt Groening series Futurama, "Space Pilot 3000", where the host (now portrayed as a head preserved in a jar) is seen hosting New Year's Rockin' Eve 3000.

In the 1994 flim Forrest Gump, footage of Clark from the first two editions of New Year's Rockin' Eve were edited together and can be seen on a television at a bar and when Jenny left her home during a scene of the film being held on New Year's Eve in 1972. New Year's Rockin' Eve itself was the subject of a 1999 episode of Friends, "The One with the Routine", in which Janine invites Joey, Ross, and Monica to attend an in-universe taping for the special as audience members.

In the last 1995 episode of Mad About You, "New Year's Eve", the 1996 ball drop is stuck for an extended time because of tangled lines. Clark appears in a cameo appearance from his living room lamenting that he missed this unique occurrence on "the one time I decided to stay home," although in reality, Clark did host the 1996 edition.
