= George Lewis (journalist) =

American journalist

- Education: San Diego State University (BA)
- Years active: 1962–2012
- Known for: Correspondent at NBC News for 42 years
- Spouses: Jane Lewis (m. 1964; sep. 1993) Judy Muller (m. 2022)
- Children: 2

George Lewis is an American retired television journalist who worked for NBC News for 42 years from 1969 to 2012. His stories have appeared on NBC Nightly News.

Lewis joined NBC in December 1969 as a war correspondent covering the Vietnam War. He also covered the Iranian hostage crisis from 1979 to 1981, the 1989 Tiananmen Square revolt in China, and Operation Desert Storm in 1991. Lewis has won three Emmys, the George Foster Peabody Award, and the Edward R. Murrow Award throughout his career covering wars and other events abroad.

Based in Los Angeles, Lewis regularly reported on the revolution in information technology. In 1993, he did a Nightly News series titled Almost 2001, which marked the beginning of interactive electronic exchanges between television networks and their viewers. Those watching the reports were urged to send e-mails, some of which were read on the air. It was an early use of the word "dot-com" on a news program. He retired from NBC News on January 25, 2012. Lewis was married to his first wife Jane Cook and the pair raised 2 daughters until George and Jane separated in 1993 but remained close friends until Cook died in a car crash in 2016. Lewis is currently married to Judy Muller.
