= Elizabeth Stark =

Elizabeth Stark may refer to:

- Elizabeth Stark (explorer), Scottish-born mountaineer and professor of speech science
- Elizabeth Stark, character in the video game From Russia with Love
- Lizzie Stark, character in the TV series Peaky Blinders
- Elizabeth Stark (writer), see 12th Lambda Literary Awards

== See also ==
- Betsy Stark, media executive
