= Times Square Studios =

American television studio in New York City

Coordinates: 40°45′25″N 73°59′08″W

- Alternative names: TSSL

General information
- Location: 1500 Broadway; Times Square; New York, NY 10036; U.S.
- Current tenants: Assorted ABC News and ESPN programs (see article for programs)
- Inaugurated: 1999
- Owner: The Walt Disney Company

Design and construction
- Architect: Walt Disney Imagineering

Times Square Studios (TSS) is an American television studio owned by The Walt Disney Company. It is headquartered on the southeastern corner of West 44th Street and Broadway in Times Square, Midtown Manhattan, New York City, United States. The studio was the former production home of ABC News' Good Morning America (GMA), a morning news and talk program, segments for other ABC News programs until June 13, 2025, and various programs on ESPN.

== Background ==
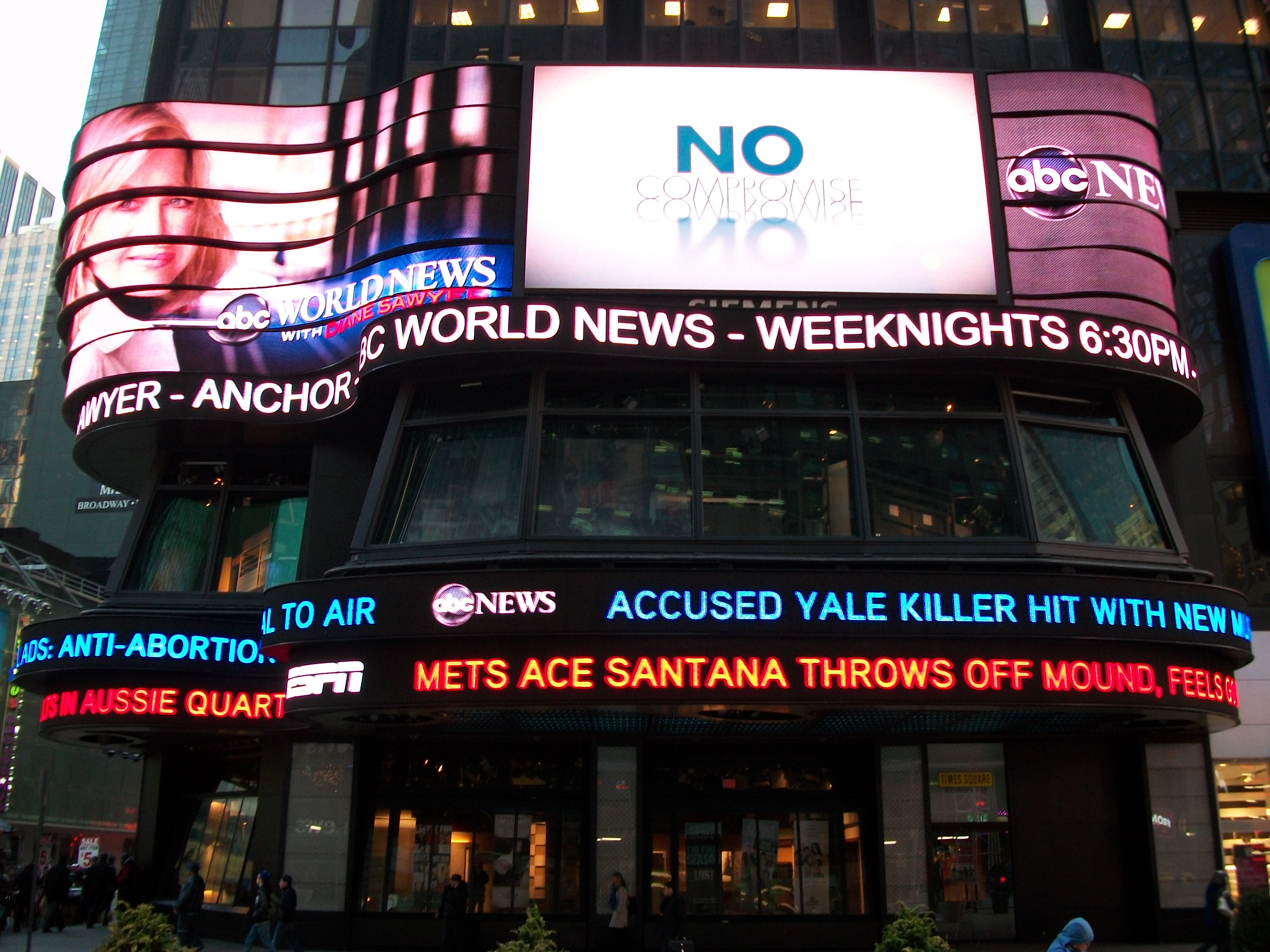
Studio exterior 3 years after 2007 refurbishment, January 2010. An advertisement for ABC World News with Diane Sawyer can be seen on the left.

Times Square Studios is within 1500 Broadway, on the site of the former Hotel Claridge. In 1972, the hotel was demolished and the current structure, which housed the National Theater, was built. The theater closed in 1998.

The New York Times felt that Times Square Studios was meant to be a response to the "Window on the World" Studio 1A NBC had launched at Rockefeller Center for its morning show Today in 1994—which marked an era of dominance for the program over ABC's competing Good Morning America. It was argued that Disney needed its own on-air showpiece in a prominent location, and that "a dynamic Manhattan street scene is now considered an essential production element for a morning show".

The facility was designed by Walt Disney Imagineering, Disney's design and development arm, and its senior vice president of concept design Eddie Sotto. The team also worked with Roger Goodman, ABC's vice president for special projects, on its facilities for Good Morning America. Sotto stated that the design of the building was meant to symbolize a "looking glass" and the idea of "media as architecture". The facade of the building also features a video screen and a pair of news tickers, both of which are upgraded with state-of-the-art display technology every few years.

Alongside ABC News productions including Good Morning America, Disney also intended to lease space at the studio for other productions. Under the direction of Tim Hayes, notable early productions originating from Times Square Studios included 20/20, Primetime, ABC College Football, NBA Shootaround, The Insider, Entertainment Tonight, and many others between the years 1999 and 2007. The studio began to serve primarily as the home to Good Morning America in 2007 until 2025 and ended their work with most other programs in the facility.

== Productions at Times Square Studios ==
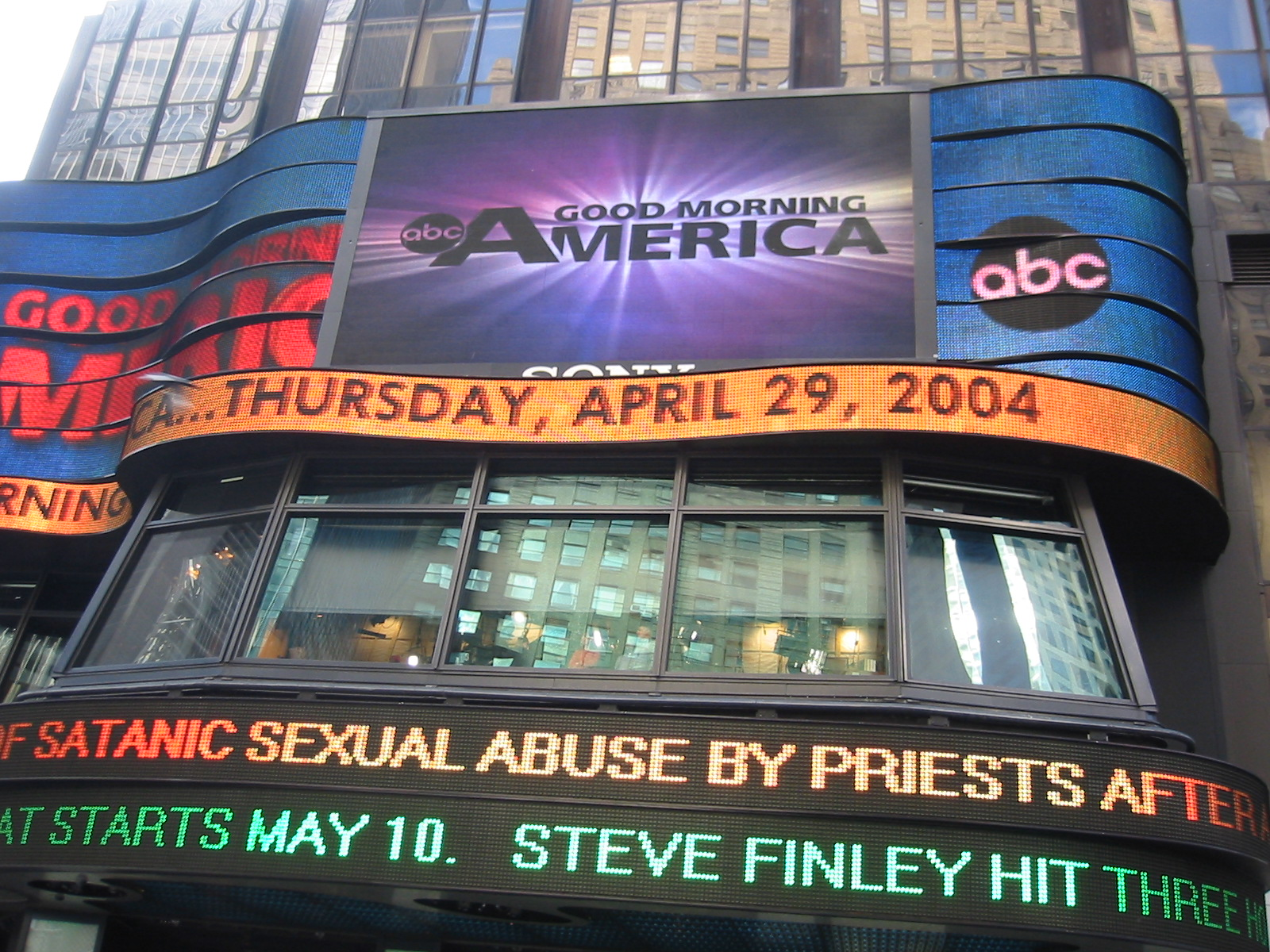
Exterior (looking east from Broadway) of the Times Square Studios (April 2004)

- Good Morning America — ABC News morning television program
- GMA3 — The permanent Good Morning America afternoon counterpart, premiered September 2018
- Dick Clark's New Year's Rockin' Eve (Times Square Countdown New Year Celebrations) — ABC's New Year's Eve live telecast
- ABC News Election Night coverage, biennially every first November Tuesday from 2000 to 2016
- ABC 2000 Today — ABC News coverage of the turn of the millennium celebrations from New Year's Eve (December 31) 1999 into New Year's Day (January 1) 2000
- ABC and ESPN — National Basketball Association (NBA) pre-game and half-time updates
- Hand in Hand: A Benefit for Hurricane Relief, 2017 (New York City portions)
- ESPN College Football — some weekly and Scoreboard coverage, an episode of College GameDay in 2017.
- Good Morning America Weekend — The weekend version of Good Morning America; outside of special events, the program was recorded at ABC News' main studio at the ABC Television Center in the Lincoln Square neighborhood of Manhattan with a Times Square backdrop is projected onto the set's rear-projection screen for continuity purposes
- ABC World News Tonight — ABC News flagship daily evening television news program
- Nightline — ABC News late-night news program
- World News Now — ABC News overnight news program
- Olbermann — ESPN2
- 20/20 — ABC News television-newsmagazine program

== See also ==
- One Astor Plaza
