= Living It Up! with Ali & Jack =

- Genre: Talk show
- Presented by: Alexandra "Ali" Wentworth; Jack Ford
- Country of origin: United States
- Original language: English
- No. of seasons: 1

Production
- Camera setup: Multi-camera
- Running time: 48 minutes
- Production company: King World Productions

Original release
- Network: First run syndication
- Release: September 29, 2003 – April 23, 2004

Living It Up! with Ali & Jack is a syndicated daytime television talk show that aired from September 2003 to April 2004, hosted by Alexandra "Ali" Wentworth and Jack Ford, based out of New York City.

The show was conceived as a competitor to WABC/Disney-ABC Domestic Television's Live with Regis and Kelly, which has dominated mid-morning television since its national premiere in 1988. Ali & Jack was produced by King World (now CBS Television Distribution), and the syndicator tried to copy Regis and Kelly's plan of airing on almost all of WABC's fellow ABC owned and operated stations, and strong local stations in other markets. Viacom (King World's parent at the time) cleared Ali & Jack on their CBS and UPN O&O's, and in New York took Regis and Kelly head-on at 9 AM on WCBS.

Ali & Jack started at its debut airing in at least 60% of the U.S. However, the show failed to pick up any steam in the ratings, receiving critical drubbing from the start because of what critics noted were too many similarities to Regis and Kelly, and what they saw as an apparent lack of chemistry between Ford and Wentworth. Some stations would move the show to late at night to stem their losses (out of the intended mid-morning berth), and others would drop the show altogether even before cancellation or send it to air on weaker sister stations. In other markets the show never aired at all. The show also struggled with backstage strife and being unable to book strong guests, who were usually snapped up by the network morning shows, Regis and Kelly, and The View.

Ali & Jack ended up being the lowest-rated new series in all of syndication for the 2003–04 TV season, and the show was cancelled by April 2004, through reruns continued until August 2004.
