= Jack Ford (journalist) =

American lawyer and journalist

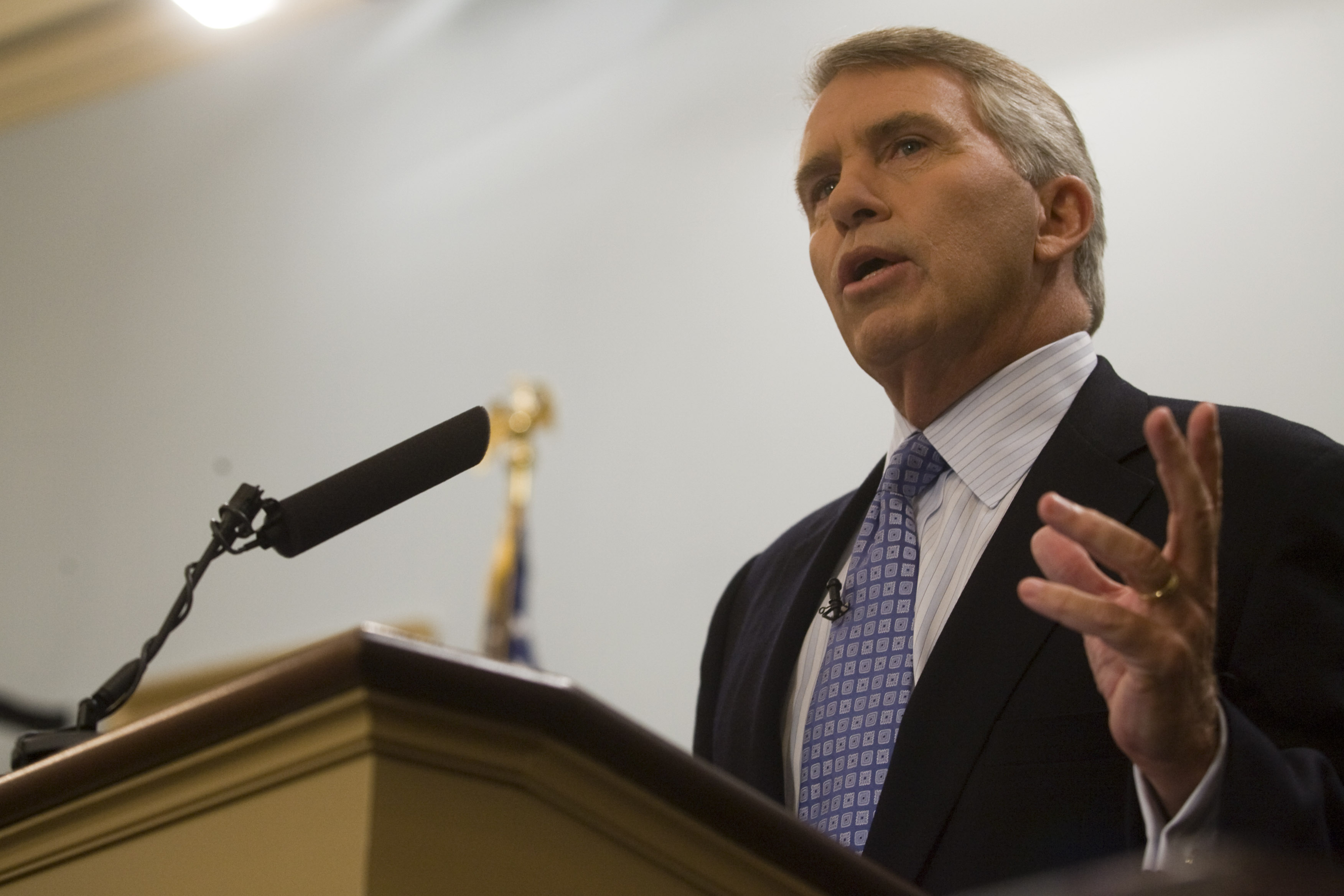
Jack Ford at the Miller Center of Public Affairs Forum

Jack Ford is an American television news personality specializing in legal commentary. He has spent over two decades in front of the TV camera as a host and presenter of numerous information and entertainment programs. In addition, he is a lecturer at Yale University.

== Early life ==
Raised by a single parent, Ford grew up in Point Pleasant Beach and attended Point Pleasant Beach High School. He graduated from Yale University, where he played football on a scholarship. He also earned a Juris Doctor degree from Fordham University School of Law. He subsequently spent three years as a prosecutor in New Jersey, before beginning his own private practice as a lawyer. He also served as an adjunct professor of law at Fordham Law School.

== Career ==
In 1984, Ford was hired by WCBS-TV as its legal commentator and joined Courtroom Television Network upon its launch on July 1, 1991. He moved to NBC News in 1994 as the chief legal correspondent and succeeded Mike Schneider as the co-anchor with Giselle Fernandez of the network's morning show Weekend Today in May 1995. He continued to host the show with interim co-anchor Ann Curry in 1996, Jodi Applegate from 1996 to April 1999, and with Soledad O'Brien from April to July 1999. That year he was named "Sexiest News Anchor" by People magazine.

In September 1999, Ford joined ABC News and became a correspondent for 20/20 and Good Morning America. On December 31, 1999, he was in Times Square as part of ABC 2000 Today, the network's 23-hour worldwide coverage of the Millennium, hosted by Peter Jennings. During ABC's coverage of the millennium, both he and Dick Clark counted down the final minutes until 2000 arrived in Times Square. Ford was the moderator of ESPN's The Sports Reporters from 2002 to 2003 and co-hosted the short-lived syndicated talk show Living It Up! With Ali & Jack, which premiered on September 15, 2003. Produced at the CBS Broadcast Center in New York, the program, with "Ali", (actress Alexandra "Ali" Wentworth), started with high ratings, but quickly lost ground and terminated production after seven months, although repeats continued for another four months, to August 2004.

In June 2004, Ford returned to Court TV (now truTV) and on January 17, 2006, began co-hosting, with Ashleigh Banfield the two-hour daily afternoon program Banfield & Ford: Courtside. Since 2009 he has been a CBS News Legal Analyst. He has been a Visiting Lecturer at Yale University since 2007, teaching an undergraduate seminar titled "Trials of the Twentieth Century," a course which he also taught at New York University in 2019.

He has also stayed involved in the game of football. Since 2000, he has been on the board of the National Football Foundation and is also a Vice Chairman.

Since 2018, he has served as a college football analyst for ESPN, calling Ivy League football games.

He is the author of "The Osiris Alliance" (2009), a suspense novel about nuclear smuggling.

He has received two Emmy Awards, a Peabody Award, an American Radio and Television Award, a National Headliner Award, and the March of Dimes FDR Award.

Ford had been a resident of Interlaken, New Jersey and moved to Spring Lake, where he lives with his wife and two children. He was a contestant on the original version of Jeopardy! with Art Fleming, winning three games.
