= Betsy Stark =

American television journalist

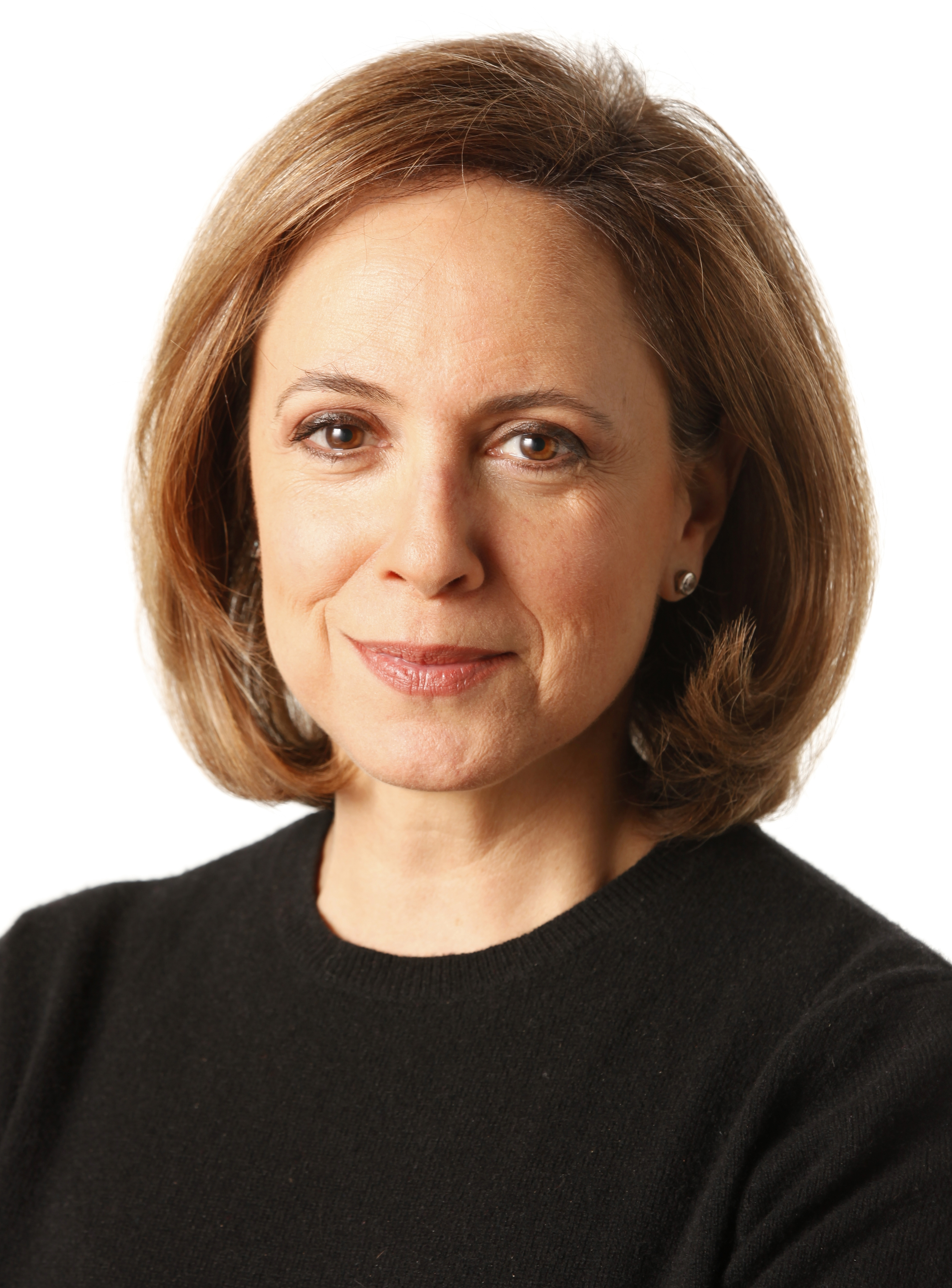
Betsy Stark

Betsy Stark is an American media executive and former broadcast news correspondent. Since January 2011, she has been managing director of content and media strategy for the global communications firm Ogilvy Public Relations a division of WPP.

In July 2013, PRWeek named Stark a “game changer” on its annual Power List, citing her work creating journalistic-quality content to help Ogilvy's clients tell their stories. Her work directing a 13-part video series on behalf of the Government of Mexico was honored with both SABRE and PR Week awards for reputation and crisis management.

== Broadcast journalism career ==
Stark is best known for her decades of work as an award-winning financial reporter and anchorwoman, most notably as the business correspondent for ABC News. Stark led the network's coverage of business and the economy from 1998 to 2010, a period that included the Great Recession. Her stories appeared on ABC World News Tonight with Peter Jennings and Charles Gibson, Good Morning America, This Week and other ABC News programs.

Over the course of her journalism career, Stark won four national Emmy Awards, including a 2005 Business Emmy for her enterprise reporting on “The Broken Pension Promise” and a 2009 Emmy for her contributions to ABC's team coverage of “The Inauguration of Barack Obama.”

She is the winner of two George Foster Peabody Awards, one for her contributions to ABC's coverage of “9/11” and a second for her participation in ABC 2000 the network's coverage of the dawn of the new millennium.

Her story “Motherhood on Madison Avenue: The Neil French Flap,” exploring sexism in the advertising industry, was honored with a 2006 Gracie Award for hard news features from the Alliance for Women in Media.

Stark has interviewed dozens of CEOs, government leaders and top economic policymakers. In 2006 she was invited by The White House to conduct an exclusive interview with Pres. George W. Bush on his stewardship of the economy. But her reporting also focused on the challenges faced by ordinary Americans. Her signature series, “The Kitchen Table Economy,” featured intimate portraits of families affected by the economic crisis. The series put a human face on the worst economic slowdown since the Depression and received wide acclaim. She also frequently reported on workforce issues, gender bias, pay inequities, opportunities for disabled workers, the work-life balance, elder care, the "sandwich" generation and efforts by older workers to reinvent their careers.

While at ABC, Stark was one of the most prolific reporters in all of network television, consistently placing in the Tyndall Report's top 20 for the most on-air appearances. In 2008, during the financial crisis, she was among Tyndall's top five. During the height of the crisis, when Stark appeared on the broadcast almost every evening, ABC World News won the ratings race.

On April 2, 2010, Stark announced that she had been laid off as part of a 25 percent staff downsizing by ABC News.

In late 2010, Stark contributed stories to the PBS NewsHour, including a series of reports on how the tough economy was impacting the 2010 midterm elections, part of PBS' Patchwork Nation project.

In 2010, she also served as guest host of WBUR's On Point, a two-hour national radio program syndicated by NPR.

Stark began her television career as a documentary producer for the Public Broadcasting Service (PBS) program "Inside Story," for which she won a 1983 Emmy Award for Outstanding Investigative Reporting for her work on the CBS News versus William Westmoreland lawsuit.

In 1988, she joined Dow Jones as a correspondent and later senior producer of the weekly "Wall Street Journal Report." In 1996, she became anchor and editor of her own live, daily business news program, "Heard on the Street A.M." Stark also anchored a public affairs program, "Metro Journal," which won an award for local political coverage in its first year.

== Personal life ==
She is a graduate of Smith College in Northampton, Massachusetts, which has named her one of its most Notable Alumnae.

Ms. Stark is the mother of two children, Ben, a lawyer, and Sara, a writer and art historian. She lives in New York City.

== Awards ==
- Holmes Report, Global SABRE Awards, Winner, "Fighting Fire With Fire: Resetting the Media Dialogue For Mexico," Mexico Tourism Board, Ogilvy PR/New York (2012)
- PRNews Platinum PR Awards, Honorable Mention, Crisis Management, "Fighting Fire with Fire: Resetting the Media Dialogue for Mexico," Mexico Tourism Board, Ogilvy PR (2012)
- National Emmy Awards for “The Broken Pension Promise,”(2005) “ABC 2000,”(1999) and “The CBS-Westmoreland Controversy.”(1983) “The Inauguration of Barack Obama” (2009)
- George Foster Peabody Award for “Coverage of 9/11” (2001) and “ABC 2000” (1999)
- Gracie Award for “Motherhood on Madison Avenue” (2006)
- ICI-American University Award for Excellence in Personal Finance Journalism for “Midwest Floods”
- NYSSCPA Award for Excellence in Financial Journalism for “Paying Down the Debt”
