= Steve Osunsami =

American news broadcaster

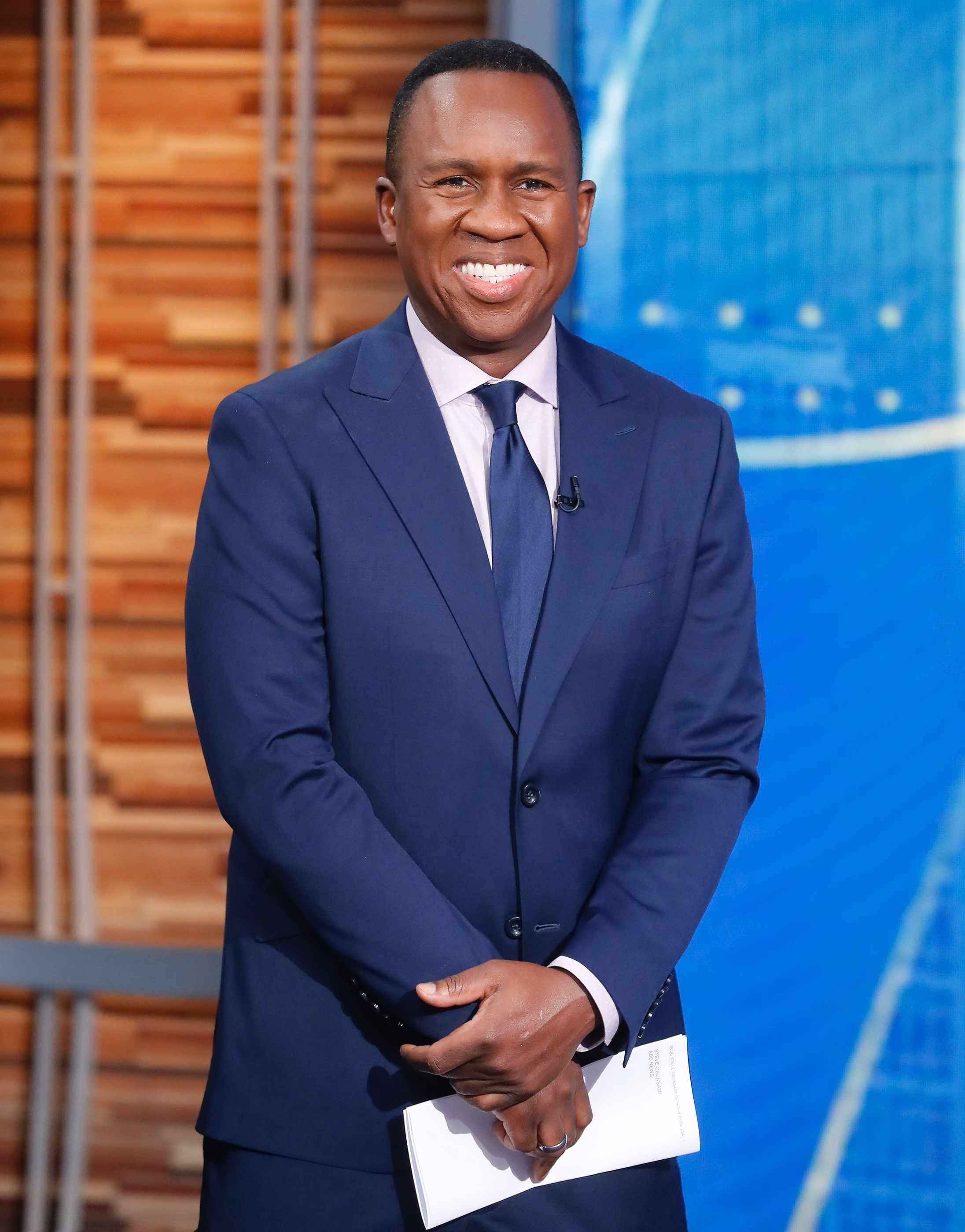
- Osunsami in 2023
- Born: Washington, D.C., U.S.
- Education: University of Illinois Urbana-Champaign
- Occupations: Journalist; news correspondent
- Spouse: Joe Remillard

Stephen A. Osunsami is an American journalist. He is a senior national correspondent for ABC News in Atlanta, Georgia, contributing reports to World News with David Muir, Good Morning America, and other station broadcasts and platforms since his start with ABC News in 1997.

== Early life and education ==
Osunsami was born in Washington, D.C., to parents who were Nigerian immigrants. Osunsami has shared that he came from poverty and is a graduate of the Head Start Program. He is a graduate of University of Illinois Urbana-Champaign, where being an Illinois Broadcasting Association intern and writing for The Daily Illini helped launch his career.

== Career ==
Osunsami started his career at WREX-TV in Rockford, Illinois, WOOD-TV in Grand Rapids, Michigan, and at KOMO-TV in Seattle before becoming a correspondent for ABC News in 1997.

His work has taken him all over the country, from covering riots in Baltimore and Ferguson Missouri, to the 2000 United States presidential election recount in Florida, and the shooting deaths of nine black parishioners at the Charleston church shooting in 2015.

Osunsami was the subject of political debate after he was one of several African-American reporters who showed emotion live on the air on the night of the election of the nation's first black president, Barack Obama.

Amidst the political and racial unrest of 2020, Osunsami covered the killing of Rayshard Brooks and the murder of Ahmaud Arbery.

Osunsami wrote and hosted the ABC podcast "Soul of a Nation: Tulsa's Buried Truth," which explores the 1921 Tulsa race massacre through archival audio and conversations with historians. Speaking on his personal connection to the project, Osunsami said, "It shocks me, as a high school and college-educated Black American, that until recently, the details of the Tulsa massacre have escaped me, and I think that’s a shame. It says a ton about the way we, as Americans, record history that’s racist and ugly. We like to give it the silent treatment. And like a fight with someone in your family, simply ignoring the injury never makes it go away."

An essay by Osunsami was featured in the book, “My America: What My Country Means to Me, by 150 Americans from All Walks of Life,” edited by Hugh Downs.

== Awards and honors ==
Osunsami has won or been nominated for many awards, including a National Emmy Award. In 2022, he was inducted into the Illini Media Hall of Fame. Osunsami’s documentary special “Soul of a Nation: Acceptance High” won a 2023 Webby Award. In 2023, Osunsami was inducted into the National Academy of Television Arts & Sciences’ Silver Circle Society of Honor.

== Personal ==
Osunsami is gay and has spoken publicly on both his experiences as a black gay man in journalism, and a black member of the LGBTQ community. He is married to Joe Remillard.
