= John McWethy =

American journalist

John Fleetwood McWethy (February 28, 1947 – February 6, 2008) was an American journalist.

McWethy was born in Aurora, Illinois, and graduated with a Bachelor of Science degree in 1969 from DePauw University, where he was a member of the Sigma Chi fraternity. In 1970, he graduated from the Columbia University Graduate School of Journalism. McWethy was a 1965 graduate of Lyons Township High School in La Grange, Illinois. In 1993, he was inducted into the high school's Hall of Fame.

McWethy began his career with U.S. News & World Report, starting as a science editor in 1972, before becoming the magazine's White House correspondent in 1977.

McWethy joined ABC News in 1979. He was the network's National Security Correspondent from 1985 until his retirement in 2003, and was in The Pentagon when it was struck by hijacked American Airlines Flight 77 during the September 11 attacks.

McWethy received five Emmy Awards, the Alfred I. duPont-Columbia University Award, and an Overseas Press Club award in 1987. He received an honorary doctorate degree from his alma mater, DePauw in 2003.

McWethy continued to serve as a Special Correspondent for ABC News until 2006, and was a Senior Advisor to the United States Army Command and General Staff College. On 11 August 2004, he moderated the first "News and Terrorism: Communicating in a Crisis" workshop, a joint program by the National Academy of Engineering, the Radio-Television News Directors Foundation, and the U.S. Department of Homeland Security.

McWethy died in a skiing accident while at Keystone Resort. Witnesses reported he missed a turn and struck a tree, suffering blunt force trauma to his chest.

John McWethy is survived by a wife and two adult children.
