= 16th TCA Awards =

US television awards ceremony in 2000

- Date: July 14, 2000
- Venue: Ritz-Carlton Huntington Hotel and Spa, Pasadena, California

Highlights
- Program of the Year: The West Wing
- Outstanding New Program: The West Wing

The 16th TCA Awards were presented by the Television Critics Association. The ceremony was held on July 14, 2000, at the Ritz-Carlton Huntington Hotel and Spa in Pasadena, California.

== Winners and nominees ==
Category	Winner	Other Nominees
Program of the Year	The West Wing (NBC)	Buffy the Vampire Slayer (The WB); Sex and the City (HBO); The Sopranos (HBO); Who Wants to Be a Millionaire (ABC)
Outstanding Achievement in Comedy	Malcolm in the Middle (Fox)	Everybody Loves Raymond (CBS); Frasier (NBC); Sex and the City (HBO); Will & Grace (NBC)
Outstanding Achievement in Drama	The West Wing (NBC)	Buffy the Vampire Slayer (The WB); Freaks and Geeks (NBC); Once and Again (ABC); The Practice (ABC); The Sopranos (HBO)
Outstanding Achievement in Movies, Miniseries and Specials	The Corner (HBO)	Annie (ABC); Arabian Nights (ABC); Fail Safe (CBS); Jesus (CBS)
Outstanding New Program of the Year	The West Wing (NBC)	Freaks and Geeks (NBC); Judging Amy (CBS); Malcolm in the Middle (Fox); Once and Again (ABC)
Individual Achievement in Comedy	Jane Kaczmarek - Malcolm in the Middle (Fox)	Sean Hayes - Will & Grace (NBC); Megan Mullally - Will & Grace (NBC); Frankie Muniz - Malcolm in the Middle (Fox); Ray Romano - Everybody Loves Raymond (CBS)
Individual Achievement in Drama	James Gandolfini - The Sopranos (HBO)	Allison Janney - The West Wing (NBC); Martin Sheen - The West Wing (NBC); Aaron Sorkin - The West Wing (NBC); Sela Ward - Once and Again (ABC)
Outstanding Achievement in Children's Programming	Between the Lions (PBS)	Arthur (PBS); Bear in the Big Blue House (Disney Channel); Blue's Clues (Nickelodeon); Sesame Street (PBS)
Outstanding Achievement in News and Information	ABC 2000: The Millennium (ABC)	60 Minutes (CBS); The American President (PBS); Frontline (PBS); Walking with Dinosaurs (Discovery Channel)
Career Achievement Award	Dick Van Dyke	Mary Tyler Moore; Aaron Spelling; Mike Wallace; Dick Wolf

=== Multiple wins ===
The following shows received multiple wins:

Wins	Recipient
3	The West Wing
2	Malcolm in the Middle

=== Multiple nominations ===
The following shows received multiple nominations:

Nominations	Recipient
6	The West Wing
4	Malcolm in the Middle
3	Once and Again
3	The Sopranos
3	Will & Grace
2	Buffy the Vampire Slayer
2	Everybody Loves Raymond
2	Freaks and Geeks
2	Sex and the City
