= Judy Muller =

American journalist

Judy Muller is an American journalist. She has been a correspondent for ABC News since 1990, contributing reports to such programs as Nightline and World News Tonight. She was a regular contributor to National Public Radio's Morning Edition program. Previous to her employment with ABC, she worked for CBS News, contributing to CBS News Sunday Morning and the CBS Weekend News on television, as well as a regular radio feature, First Line Report.

Muller is a graduate of Mary Washington College (now called University of Mary Washington). She joined the faculty of the Annenberg School for Communication at the University of Southern California in August 2003 as an assistant professor of journalism, and is now serves a professor emerita of journalism.

As part of the Nightline team, she received an Alfred I. duPont-Columbia University Award for coverage of the 1992 Los Angeles riots and an Emmy Award for coverage of the O. J. Simpson case.

She has written a book entitled Now This: Radio, Television—and the Real World (2000).

Muller facilitated workshops for the Alan Alda Center for Communicating Science.
