= Carole Simpson =

American journalist (born 1940)

- Born: December 7, 1940 (age 85)
- Education: University of Michigan
- Occupations: Broadcast journalist, news anchor, and author
- Known for: First African-American woman to anchor a major network newscast

Carole Simpson (born December 7, 1940) is an American retired broadcast journalist, news anchor, and author. She is the first African-American woman to anchor a major United States network newscast.

== Education and career ==
Simpson graduated from the University of Michigan, and began her career on radio at WCFL in Chicago, Illinois. In 1965 she became the first woman and first African-American woman to broadcast radio news in Chicago. Simpson was later hired at WBBM. She moved to television at Chicago's WMAQ and on to NBC News in 1975, becoming the first African-American woman to anchor a major network newscast. She joined ABC News in 1982, and was an anchor for the weekend edition of World News Tonight from 1988 until October 2003.

=== 1992 US presidential debate ===
Simpson became the first woman of color to moderate a presidential debate when she presided over the forum held between George H. W. Bush, Bill Clinton, and Ross Perot, at Richmond, Virginia, in 1992. That same year she was the recipient of the Journalist of the Year Award from the National Association of Black Journalists.

Simpson is on the Advisory Council at the International Women's Media Foundation.

She retired from ABC News in 2006 to begin teaching journalism at Emerson College in Boston, Massachusetts, remaining there until 2019.

Simpson is a former member of the Radio Television Digital News Foundation Board of Trustees, an affiliate of the Radio Television Digital News Association. There, she established the annual Carole Simpson Scholarship to encourage and aid aspiring minority journalism students in overcoming hurdles along their career path.

In 2010, her autobiography, Newslady, was published by AuthorHouse.

== Personal life ==
Simpson is a cousin of sportswriter and ESPN commentator Michael Wilbon.

== See also ==
- List of Emerson College people
- Lists of journalists
- List of people from Chicago
- List of University of Michigan alumni
