= Roger Goodman (director) =

American television director and producer

Roger Goodman is an independent television and live event producer specializing in event production. He worked at ABC for 43 years as a television director and producer. His career has spanned sports, news and entertainment. He has done Olympic Games, elections, wars, weddings and funerals. He is now the head of RG Productions.

== Career ==
A veteran of ABC/Disney, Goodman has as a director-producer in three areas of television programming: news, sports and entertainment, including Presidential elections, Olympic Games and the Academy Awards. Goodman was the recipient of the DGA Lifetime Achievement in News Direction Award for 2010.

His resume includes ABC 2000 Today – a broadcast using over 400 cameras from around the world for 24 continuous hours, nine Olympic Games, four Super Bowl halftime shows, the Indianapolis 500, the Kentucky Derby, Wide World of Sports, ten New York City Marathons, sports coverage, red carpet pre-shows for the Primetime Emmys and Academy Awards, two Daytime Emmy telecasts, and the 81st Annual Academy Awards for which he received Emmy and DGA nominations for achievement in directing.

He has been instrumental in a number technological advances and industry firsts. Under his direction, transmissions of live programming for Good Morning America were broadcast from a submerged nuclear submarine, the aircraft carrier Enterprise – the largest live television endeavor attempted aboard a moving aircraft carrier at sea, and from a speeding eleven-car train traveling throughout the Northeast United States. He has designed and built studios and sets including the four-story Times Square Studios – the home of Good Morning America – ABC news, magazine shows and specials. He was also responsible for the overall look and design of all of ABC News and has directed the development of ABC's efforts in interactive, enhanced television, virtual-reality production sets and other integrated new media projects.

He is the head of RG Productions Inc., which does consulting for live events, television, direction, and web production. Its clients include television networks, production companies, and commercial businesses.

=== Sports ===
He began his ABC career as a production assistant on ABC's Wide World of Sports with Jim McKay in 1965. He was a production assistant from 1965 to 1968 when he became an associate director with the show until 1976. Goodman was a director for ABC Sports from 1976 until 1980 when started working in for both ABC News and ABC Sports. He continued to work in both until 1985 when he moved exclusively to News.

He worked on broadcasts including college football, horse racing, auto racing, bowling, boxing, golf and Frank Sinatra: The Main Event Live. He was the director and/or coordinating director for nine Olympic Games, with responsibilities that included the design and creation of the Broadcast Centers. He covered the Summer and Winter Games in Grenoble, Mexico City, Munich, Innsbruck, Montreal, Lake Placid, Los Angeles, Sarajevo and Calgary.

=== News ===
When Goodman started at ABC News, he was the director of production development. He was promoted to director of production and design for both News and Sports in 1985. In 1990, he became senior director with responsibility for the on-air look and design of all ABC News broadcasts. He continued to move up the ranks in 1996 when he was named executive director of Special Projects. In this newly created position, he was responsible for the design, direction and overall look of special programming for all of the network's divisions, including News, Sports, and Entertainment. Two years later, in 1998, he became vice president of Special Projects. This gave him a new set of responsibilities including overseeing the development of ABC's entrance in interactive television and introduction of computer-generated "virtual-reality" sets to speed production and enhance versatility in the production process.

Goodman's projects throughout his tenure included developing the creative design and direction of ABC's political coverage since 1980, directing all Presidential conventions, debates, elections and inaugurations, executive director of ABC News' 15-hour coverage of the one-year anniversary of September 11, and co-executive producer and director of In Search of America: A July 4 Musical Celebration. He played a large part in the development and execution of the Times Squares studio where GMA, the Millennium, and many more shows have been produced. He also directed the Peabody Award-winning coverage of the September 11th attacks and aftermath, which was broadcast live for over 91-hours, making it the longest consecutive news report in ABC history. He served as co-executive producer and director of Norman Lear's Independence Day 2001, which celebrated the 225th Anniversary of the signing of the Declaration of Independence.

On December 31, 1999, Goodman was the co-executive producer and director of ABC 2000 Today: The Millennium, the distinctive and unprecedented 24-hour news and entertainment broadcast where 175 million viewers took a world tour of New Years' celebrations that took place in more than 60 countries. Goodman directed the entire 24 hours, using over 400 cameras, 32 satellites, 4 control rooms and a staff of 1,000 technicians.

Goodman has designed and directed 20/20, Primetime Live, Nightline, This Week, Good Morning America's live interview by Diane Sawyer with Michael Jackson and Lisa Marie Presley, Primetime Live's tours of the White House and the Kremlin, and the 50th anniversary of D-Day. He created the visual concept for televised town hall meetings for Ted Koppel and Peter Jennings. He also directed the historic town hall meetings that aired during the week-long series Nightline in South Africa and Nightline in the Holy Land, the critically acclaimed series examining Arab-Israeli conflicts; and the four-hour Nightline on AIDS, at the time, the most comprehensive coverage of the epidemic ever shown on network television. He also served as director for other ABC News Specials including Liberty Weekend, Capital to Capital, the historic series which marked the first live exchanges between members of Congress and the high-ranking officials at the Kremlin, and many Peter Jennings's children's specials.

=== Entertainment ===
Goodman directed the 81st Academy Awards.

Other entertainment credits include directing the Daytime Emmy Awards, Red Carpet pre-shows for the Primetime Emmys and the Academy Awards, David Blaine: Frozen in Time, Extreme Makeover Home Edition Live, the live Michael Jackson Talks…to Oprah special event (which drew a worldwide viewing audience of 110 million people,) the original Battle of the Network Stars, and ABC's Upfront presentations live from Lincoln Center and Radio City Music Hall.

== Awards ==
Goodman has received 61 Emmy nominations and 29 Emmy Awards, three Christopher Awards, three Peabody Awards, two Edward R. Murrow Awards, the first Gold Baton presented by the Alfred I. DuPont-Columbia University Awards, a George Polk Award, two International Broadcast Design Awards, the 1988 Directors Guild of America Directorial Achievement Award for the Indianapolis 500, six Videographer's Awards, a Communicator Award, American Bar Association Silver Gavel Award, and 1992 Cine Award. In 2010 he was awarded the Life Time Achievement in News Directing award by the Directors Guild of America.

== Biography ==
Goodman started at WBKB in Chicago. In 1965 when a space opened up at Wide World of Sports, he was transferred to New York. He was drafted into the army where he helped produce on a variety of teaching films. He then returned to ABC to continue his career.
