= 2000 Today =

International television special

- Fire themed variation of the ident
- Genre: New Year's television special
- Created by: Zvi Dor-Ner
- Developed by: Zvi Dor-Ner
- Presented by: Various (see below)
- Starring: Musical artists
- Countries of origin: United Kingdom; United States

Production
- Executive producers: Avril MacRory; Peter McGhee; Neil Eccles; Zvi Dor-Ner
- Running time: 28 hours (United Kingdom); 25 hours and 30 minutes (International broadcasts)

Original release
- Network: Various (see below)
- Release: 31 December 1999 – 1 January 2000

Related
- ABC 2000 (United States); CBC News 2000 Today (Canada); Millennium Eve: Celebrate 2000 (Ireland)

2000 Today is an internationally broadcast television special that was aired to commemorate the beginning of the Year 2000. This programme included New Year's Eve celebrations, musical performances, and other features from participating nations.

Most international broadcasts such as the Olympic Games coverage originate from a limited area for worldwide distribution. 2000 Today was rare in that its live and taped programming originated from member countries and represented all continents.

== Development ==
2000 Today was conceived as part of the Millennium celebrations, given the numerical significance of the change from 1999 to 2000. 2000 Today was commissioned by the BBC as one of the five main millennium projects that were broadcast across TV, radio and online services throughout 1999 and 2000.

Most nations that observe the Islamic calendar were not involved in 2000 Today. However, a few predominantly Muslim nations were represented among the programme's worldwide broadcasters such as Egypt (ERTU) and Indonesia (RCTI). Africa was minimally represented in 2000 Today. The only participating nations from that continent were Egypt and South Africa. Portugal-based RTP África distributed the programme to some African nations.

Antarctica was mentioned on the programme schedule, although it was unclear if 2000 Today coverage was recorded or live.

== Production ==
The programme was produced and televised by an international consortium of 60 broadcasters, headed by the BBC in the United Kingdom and WGBH in Boston, United States. The editorial board also included representatives from ABC (Australia), CBC (Canada), CCTV (China), ETC (Egypt), RTL (Germany), SABC (South Africa), TF1 (France), TV Asahi (Japan), TV Globo (Brazil) and ABC (USA). The BBC provided the production hub for receiving and distributing the 78 international satellite feeds required for this broadcast. The idents for the programme were designed in the UK by Lambie-Nairn and the BBC for use by all the participating broadcasters taking part in the event. The linking theme throughout all the idents and promotions was a distinctively shaped stone engraved with the year 2000. The themes were: desert, fire, ice, lasers and water; plus a special BBC News ident.

Up to 5,000 staff worked on 2000 Today, 1,500 of them in BBC Television Centre in West London, where all eight television studios were used during the 28-hour broadcast. Each participant financed and produced its own contributions and shared the core costs proportionately to its size and wealth. It is estimated to have cost $6 million to produce and broadcast. At the time, technicians at Radio-Canada were on strike. Transmissions were seen as scheduled, but using only the main feed from the BBC, with a French voice-over. Also, as a consequence, millennium footage from Canada was scarce on SRC's presentation, while footage from Quebec was not available at all worldwide (though the CBC did manage to get the only Quebec coverage on their own network during CBC 2000 Today—a video shot of midnight fireworks in Hull, Quebec, shot from Ottawa, Ontario).

2000 Today was nominated for "Best Visual Effects and Graphic Design" at the 2000 British Academy Television Craft Awards.

== Programme timeline ==
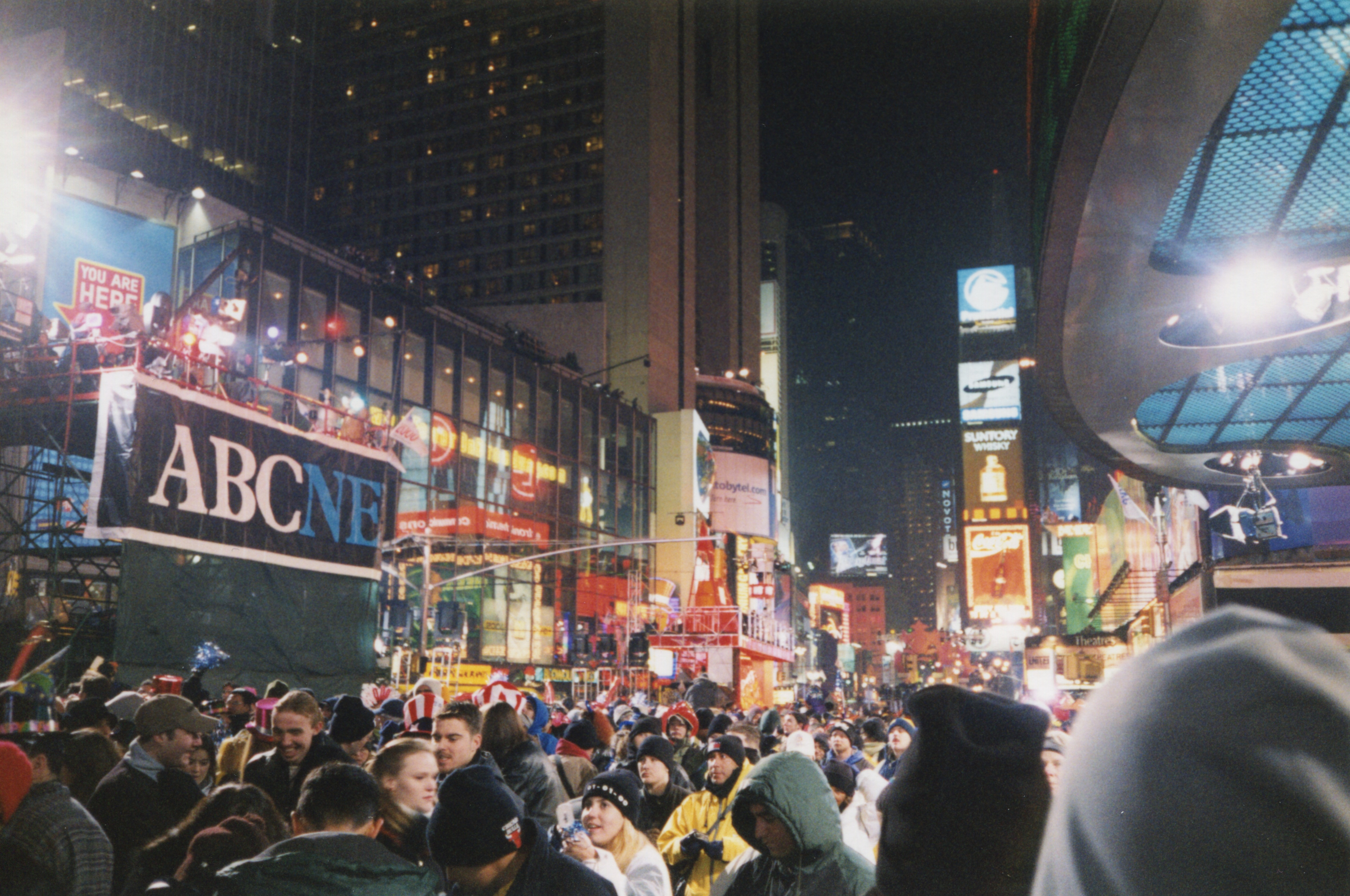
An ABC News stage in Times Square during its ABC 2000 Today broadcast.

2000 Today's core international broadcast was 28 hours and 15 minutes long, following the beginning of the New Year 2000 across the world's time zones. The programme was tailored by individual broadcasters to provide local content and hosts. There was no in-vision commentary or studio used for the Estonian broadcast and was aired on TV3 without commentary between midnight and 6:00 UTC.

The broadcast on BBC One in the United Kingdom started on 31 December 1999 at 09:15 UTC. 2000 Today started its international feed at 09:40 UTC, with the Kiribati Line Islands celebrating the arrival of 2000 at 10:00 UTC.

The Australian celebrations are held all across the country with the most notable one being the famous midnight fireworks in Sydney (13:00 UTC) and is televised nationally on ABC.

Most of Europe celebrated midnight at 23:00 UTC. Broadcasting celebrations from many countries under Central European Time posed a particularly complex broadcast challenge. 2000 Today chose to rapidly air each nation's midnight observances in succession, using tape delays in most cases. This hour of the broadcast included a blessing by Pope John Paul II from Vatican City and the pyrotechnic display of the Eiffel Tower in Paris. Italian broadcaster RAI covered the blessings in Vatican City, while French broadcaster TF1 covered the Eiffel Tower in Paris.

The celebrations in London (00:00 UTC) included the opening of the Millennium Dome and the London Eye, the chimes of Big Ben, and a massive fireworks display (known as the “River of Fire”). The BBC was there to cover the festivities from across the country.

For the Eastern Time Zone (05:00 UTC), 2000 Today chose to rapidly air each country’s observance of the celebrations with the most notable one being the famous “Ball Drop” in Times Square, New York. American broadcaster ABC covered the festivities nationwide with Peter Jennings & Dick Clark during ABC 2000 Today and as the ball drops, it shows a crowd of two million spectators who are counting down to midnight.

2000 Today's international feed finished shortly after midnight celebrations were broadcast from Samoa on 1 January 2000 at 11:00 UTC. BBC One in the United Kingdom continued to broadcast with national features until 13:30. Later the same evening, it aired a two-hour highlights programme, The Best of 2000 Today.

== Personalities ==
=== National hosts ===
- Argentina (Canal 13 – El Día del Milenio)
  - Mónica Cahen D'Anvers and César Mascetti (presenters of Telenoche)
  - Marley
  - Julián Weich
  - Pancho Ibañez
  - Luís Otero
  - Santo Biasatti
  - Guillermo Andino
  - Mercedes Sosa and Alejandro Lerner
  - Lito Vitale
  - Coro de Buenos Aires
  - Julio Bocca and Eleonora Cassano
- Australia (ABC Australia)
  - George Negus
  - Maxine McKew
  - Deborah Kennedy
  - Mike Bailey
  - Andrea Stretton
  - Caroline Baum
  - John Lombard
  - Jennifer Byrne
  - James O'Loghlin
  - Daniel Marsden
  - Peter Thompson
  - Kathy Bowlen
  - Ken Radley
  - Nicholas Opolski
  - Mary-Ann Henshaw
  - Taylor Owynns
  - Jeremy Scrivener
  - Shane McNamara
- Brazil
  - (Rede Record)
    - Boris Casoy
    - Eliana
    - José Luiz Datena
    - Eleonora Paschoal
    - Virgínia Nowicki
    - Dalton Vigh
    - Fábio Jr
    - Raul Gil
  - (BAND)
    - Otaviano Costa
    - Márcia Peltier
    - Fernando Vannucci
    - Susana Alves
    - Marcos Hummel
    - Luciano do Valle
    - Silvia Poppovic
- Canada (CBC – CBC 2000 Today)
  - (CBC)
    - Peter Mansbridge (primary host, most hours)
    - Laurie Brown (00:00–08:00 UTC, with Mansbridge)
    - Alison Smith (13:00–18:00 UTC)
  - (Radio-Canada)
    - French voice-over
- Chile (TVN)
  - Jennifer Warner
  - Mauricio Bustamante
  - Jorge Hevia
  - Margot Kahl
  - Karen Doggenweiler
  - Felipe Camiroaga
  - Pedro Carcuro
  - Rafael Araneda
  - Andrea Molina
- China (CCTV)
  - Bai Yansong
  - Shui Junyi
  - Zhao Zhongxiang
  - Ni Ping
  - Zhu Jun
- Colombia (RCN Televisión)
  - Claudia Gurisatti
  - William Calderón
  - Iñaki Berrueta
- Czech Republic (Czech Television)
  - Marek Beneš
  - Vladimír Jiránek
  - Karel Gott
  - Břetislav Pojar
  - Pavel Koutský
  - Jiří Lábus
  - Ota Jirák
  - Václav Postránecký
  - Petr Haničinec
  - Petr Skoumal
  - Jiřina Bohdalová
  - Blanka Bohdanová
  - Jiri Salamoun
  - Karel Cernoch
  - Martin Klásek
  - Jan Balej
  - Karel Fiala
  - Zdenek Miler
  - Alena Munkova
  - Jiri Munk
  - Robert Hájek
  - Kristýna Květová
  - Petr Narozny
  - Josef Dvorak
  - Jiri Barta
  - Marek Eben
  - Ludek Sobota
  - Ludek Munzar
  - Bolek Polivka
  - Waldemar Matuska
  - Martin Dejdar
  - Iveta Bartosova
  - Jiri Suchy
  - Josef Mlady
  - Petr Jablonsky
  - Ilona Csakova
  - Jan Nedved
  - Jaroslav Uhlir
  - Jaroslav Sveceny
  - Hana Zagorova
  - Petr Bobek
  - Eva Pilarova
  - Jitka Molavcova
  - Ivan Mladek
  - Josef Alois Náhlovský
  - Jiří Korn
  - Petr Vacek
  - Lucie Vondráčková
  - Boris Hybner
  - Karel Zich
  - Josef Laufer
  - Lenka Plackova
  - Petr Vitek
  - Zdenek Smetana
  - Emil Viklicky
  - Jaromír Jágr
  - Jaromír Gal
- Estonia (TV3)
  - Ene Veiksaar (9:40–12:00 UTC)
  - Lauri Hussar (9:40–12:00 UTC)
  - Jüri Aarma (12:00–15:00 UTC)
  - Priit Aimla (12:00–15:00 UTC)
  - Rein Lang (15:00–18:00 UTC)
  - Kiur Aarma (15:00–18:00 UTC)
  - Harri Tiido (18:00–21:00 UTC)
  - Vello Rand (18:00–21:00 UTC)
  - Mart Luik (21:00–00:00 UTC)
  - Märt Treier (06:00–09:00 UTC)
  - Kätlin Kontor (06:00–09:00 UTC)
  - Enn Eesmaa (09:00–11:00 UTC)
- Finland (YLE)
  - Katariina Lillqvist
- France (TF1 – Le Millénium)
  - Jean-Claude Narcy
  - Valérie Benaïm
  - Christophe Dechavanne
  - Carole Rousseau
  - Jean-Pierre Pernaut
  - Évelyne Dhéliat
  - Claire Chazal
  - Patrick Poivre d'Arvor
  - Charles Villeneuve
- Germany (RTL Television)
  - Peter Kloeppel
  - Antonia Rados
  - Bernd Fuchs
  - Heiner Bremer
  - Michael Karr
  - Birgit von Bentzel
- Iceland
  - Sigrún Eldjárn
  - Þórarin Eldjárn
  - Þórhildur Þorleifsdóttir
- Ireland (RTÉ One – Millennium Eve: Celebrate 2000)
  - Miriam O'Callaghan
  - Mark Little
  - Geri Maye
  - Pat Kenny
  - Liz Bonnin
  - Joe Duffy
- Israel (Keshet 2)
  - Miki Haimovich
  - Ya'akov Eilon
- Italy (RAI – Millennium – La notte del 2000)
  - Bruno Pizzul
  - Monica Maggioni
  - Carlo Conti
  - Gigi Proietti
  - Valeria Marini
  - Clarissa Burt
- Japan (TV Asahi)
  - Various participants
- South Korea (MBC)
  - Sohn Suk-hee
  - Shim Hye-jin
- Lebanon
  - Azar Habib
- Mexico
  - (Televisa)
    - Ernesto Laguardia
    - Mayra Saucedo
    - Marco Antonio Regil
    - Guilliermo Ochoa
    - Guilliermo Ortega
    - Lolita Ayala
  - (Once TV)
    - Adriana Perez Cañedo
    - Jose Angel Dominguez
    - Sergio Uzeta
    - Christina Pacheco
    - Rocío Brauer
    - Lilia Silvia Hernandez
- Netherlands (NOS – Hallo 2000)
  - Maartje van Weegen
  - Philip Freriks
  - Aldith Hunkar
  - Mart Smeets
- Philippines (GMA Network – GMA Ayala Millennium Party)
  - Mike Enriquez
  - Jessica Soho
  - Mel Tiangco
  - Jay Sonza
  - German Moreno
  - Angelique Lazo
  - Vicky Morales
  - Paolo Bediones
  - Karen Davila
  - Tito Sotto
  - Arnold Clavio
  - Danilo "Mang Totong" Federez (puppeteer of Arn-arn)
  - Mickey Ferriols
  - Miriam Quiambao
  - Ryan Agoncillo
  - KC Montero
  - Suzi Entrata
  - Kara David
  - Bernadette Sembrano
  - Luchi Cruz-Valdes
  - Ninna Castro
  - Lyn Ching
  - Margaux Salcedo
  - Arnell Ignacio
  - Susan Enriquez
  - Tisha Silang
  - Antoinette Taus
  - Francis Magalona
  - Dingdong Dantes
  - Martin Andanar
  - Butch Francisco
  - Vic Sotto
  - Joey de Leon
  - Cacai Velasquez
  - Janno Gibbs
  - The Eraserheads
  - Jaya
  - Michael V.
  - Side A
  - Verni Varga
  - Lolit Solis
  - Rudy Fernandez
  - Bobby Nalzaro
  - Tek Ocampo
  - Noly Calvo
  - Jeja Rose Pornan-Simeon
  - Orly Mercado
  - Connie Angeles
  - Susan Valdez
  - Mildred Ortega
  - Gina de Venecia
  - Rose Clores
  - Nonoy Zuñiga
  - Jimmy Santos
  - Jose Mari Chan
  - Dolphy
- Poland (TVP2)
  - Halina Filek-Marszalek
- Portugal (RTP2)
  - José Rodrigues dos Santos
  - Manuela Moura Guedes
- Singapore
  - Fann Wong
  - Tanya Chua
  - Elsa Lin
- Slovakia (Jednotka)
  - Julius Pantik
  - Marián Slovák
  - Marián Labuda
- Spain (Televisión Española)
  - Jesús Álvarez Cervantes
  - Alfredo Urdaci
  - Helena Resano
  - Ramón García
  - Anne Igartiburu
  - Nuria Roca
- Ukraine
  - Vlad Ryashyn (Inter)
  - Svitlana Leontyeva (Inter)
  - Yuriy Makarov (1+1)
- United Kingdom (BBC One)
  - David Dimbleby
  - Michael Parkinson
  - Michael Buerk
  - Peter Sissons
  - Peter Snow
  - Philippa Forrester
  - Jamie Theakston
  - Gaby Roslin
  - Huw Edwards
  - Shauna Lowry
  - Tim Vincent
  - Siân Lloyd
  - Noel Thompson
  - Kate Thornton
  - Fergal Keane
  - Tony Robinson
  - Jackie Bird
  - Kirsty Wark
  - Sian Williams
  - John Kettley
  - Dale Winton
  - Steve Wilson
  - Emma Ledden
  - Katy Hill
  - Alan Dedicoat
- United States
  - (ABC – ABC 2000 Today)
    - Peter Jennings
    - Barbara Walters
    - Diane Sawyer
    - Charles Gibson
    - Elizabeth Vargas
    - Jack Ford
    - Sam Donaldson
    - Connie Chung
    - Cokie Roberts
    - Deborah Roberts
    - Carole Simpson
    - Morton Dean
    - Dick Clark
    - Frank Langella
    - Jimmy Hart
    - Richard Edson
  - (PBS)
    - Various participants
  - (Univisión - ¡Feliz 2000!)
    - Various participants
- Vietnam
  - (VTV – Chào năm 2000)
    - Nguyễn Thanh Lâm
    - Thu Uyên
  - (HTV – Thế giới chào đón năm 2000)
    - Mạnh Linh
    - Nguyệt Sa
    - Lê Hưng
    - Ngô Hồng
    - Bửu Điền
    - Đoan Thục

=== Music performers ===
Musical artists were part of the 2000 Today broadcast, including:

Africa

- Jean Michel Jarre – Giza pyramid complex, Egypt

Asia

- Maki Ohguro – Nara, Japan
- Hikaru Utada – Tokyo, Japan
- Ketsumeishi – Tokyo, Japan
- Seikima-II – Tokyo, Japan
- Regine Velasquez – Makati, Philippines

Europe

- Europe – Stockholm, Sweden
- ABBA – Stockholm, Sweden
- Zenenker Team – Hungary
- Björk – Reykjavík, Iceland
- Frantisek Ringo Cech, Prague, Czech Republic
- C&K Vocal – Prague, Czech Republic
- Maria Podhradska – Bratislava, Slovakia
- Richard Canaky – Bratislava, Slovakia
- Charlotte Church – United Kingdom
- The Corrs – London, England, United Kingdom
- Eurythmics – United Kingdom
- Ronan Keating – Dublin, Ireland
- Manic Street Preachers – Cardiff, Wales, United Kingdom
- Martine McCutcheon – United Kingdom
- Elton John – United Kingdom
- Natalie MacMaster – Ireland
- Robyn – Sweden
- Ruslana – Kyiv, Ukraine
- Simply Red – London, England, United Kingdom
- Spice Girls – London, England, United Kingdom

North America

- Bee Gees – Miami, Florida, United States
- Juan Gabriel – Mexcio City, Mexico
- Great Big Sea – St. John's, Newfoundland, Canada
- Kenny G – New York City, New York, United States
- Neil Diamond – Denver, Colorado, United States
- Phish – Big Cypress Indian Reservation, Florida, United States
- The Tragically Hip – Toronto, Ontario, Canada

Oceania

- The Wiggles – Sydney, Australia
- Split Enz – Auckland, New Zealand
- Kiri Te Kanawa – Gisborne, New Zealand

South America

- Los Fabulosos Cadillacs – Ushuaia, Argentina
- Alejandro Lerner and Mercedes Sosa – Iguazú Falls, Argentina
- Lito Vitale and Estudio Coral de Buenos Aires – Perito Moreno Glacier, Argentina
- Simón Díaz, Edwin Trocel and Sistema de Orquestas de Guayana – Angel Falls, Venezuela.

== Participating broadcasters ==
The following nations broadcast 2000 Today. Some nations were licensees of the broadcast, rather than formal members of the broadcast consortium with few Muslim-majority countries shown below.

Territory	Broadcaster
Albania	RTSH (licensee)
Argentina	Canal 13
Armenia	ARMTV
Australia	ABC
Austria	ORF
Belgium	RTBF (French), VRT (Dutch)
Bosnia and Herzegovina	BHRT
Brazil	Rede Record
Bulgaria	BNT (licensee)
Canada	CBC (English), Radio-Canada (French)
Caribbean Territories: Anguilla; Antigua and Barbuda; Aruba; Bahamas; Barbados; Cayman Islands; Dominica; Grenada; Jamaica; Netherlands Antilles; Saint Kitts and Nevis; Saint Lucia; Saint Vincent and the Grenadines; Trinidad and Tobago; Turks and Caicos Islands	CBU
Chile	TVN
China	CCTV
Colombia	RCN Televisión, Teveandina
Croatia	HRT
Cyprus	CyBC
Czech Republic	Czech Television
Denmark	DR, TV3
Dominican Republic	Telecentro
Ecuador	Teleamazonas
Egypt	ETV
Estonia	TV3
Fiji	Fiji TV
Finland	Yle
France	TF1
Georgia	GT
Germany	RTL
Greece	ERT
Hong Kong	ATV
Hungary	MTV (MTV1, selected coverage; MTV2, full coverage)
Iceland	IBC
India	Doordarshan
Indonesia	RCTI, TVRI
Ireland	RTÉ
Israel	IBA, ICP
Italy	RAI
Japan	TV Asahi
Jordan	JRTC
Latvia	LTV
Lebanon	MTV
Lithuania	TV3
Lusophone Africa Territories: Angola; Cape Verde; Guinea-Bissau; Mozambique; São Tomé and Príncipe	RTP África
Macau	TDM
Malaysia	RTM
Mexico	Once TV
Netherlands	NPO
New Zealand	TV3
Norway	NRK, TV3
Oman	Oman TV
Panama	Telemetro
Paraguay	Telefuturo
Peru	Panamericana Televisión
Philippines	GMA Network
Poland	TVP
Portugal	RTP
Romania	Antena 1 (licensee)
Russia	VGTRK, Prometey AST
Samoa	Samoa TV
Singapore	TCS, CNA, STV12, SCV
Slovakia	TV Luna (licensee), STV 1
Slovenia	POP TV (licensee)
South Africa	SABC
South Korea	MBC
Spain	TVE
Sri Lanka	MTV
Sweden	TV3, SVT
Switzerland	SRG SSR
Taiwan	PTS
Thailand	Channel 3
Tonga	TBC
Turkey	TRT
Ukraine	Novyi Kanal, Inter, 1+1
United Kingdom	BBC
United States	ABC, PBS, Univisión
Uruguay	Teledoce, TNU
Venezuela	RCTV
Vietnam	VTV, HTV
Yugoslavia	RTS, RTCG

== Ratings ==
2000 Today had an estimated worldwide audience of 800 million people, with an audience of 12.6 million people on the BBC alone.

== Soundtrack ==
2000 Today: A World Symphony for the Millennium

Soundtrack album by Tan Dun
- Released: December 1999
- Recorded: August to November 1999
- Studios: Various: Right Track Recording Studios, New York City; Sony Music Studios, New York City; Clinton Recording Studios, New York City; Studio Guillaume Tell, Paris; Extreme Music, Miami; Sound On Sound Recording, New York City; Whitfield Street Studios, Soho
- Genres: Soundtrack; classical; folk; world; country
- Length: 52:30
- Label: Sony Classical
- Producers: Grace Row; Tan Dun

Tan Dun chronology
Bitter Love (1999)	2000 Today: A World Symphony for the Millennium (1999)	Crouching Tiger, Hidden Dragon (2000)

Singles from 2000 Today: A World Symphony for the Millennium
- 1. "One Love" Released: 1999

Professional ratings
Review scores
Source	Rating
AllMusic	2.5/5 stars

2000 Today: A World Symphony for the Millennium is a television soundtrack album of music commissioned by the BBC for its internationally broadcast television special, 2000 Today and released by Sony Classical Records in December 1999. The music was composed and conducted by multi award-winning composer Tan Dun, and performed by the BBC Concert Orchestra, London Voices choir, New London Children's Choir, and a group of world instrument performers from around the world. It was featured on PBS and ABC throughout the promotions leading up to the broadcast and throughout the broadcast itself, providing musical "stepping stones" from country to country, culture to culture, day to night.

The programme's theme song was a cover version of Bob Marley's song "One Love" performed by the Gipsy Kings, Ziggy Marley, Tsidii Le Loka and the Boys Choir of Harlem. This version was released as a single in Europe. "One Love" was performed live by Gipsy Kings as part of the broadcast from Miami, Florida.

=== Track listing ===
All tracks are written by Tan Dun, with the exception of "One Love" by Marley and Curtis Mayfield.

No.	Title	Performer(s)	Length
1.	"One Love"	Boys Choir of Harlem, Gipsy Kings, Tsidii Le Loka, Ziggy Marley	4:05
2.	"Beyond Light"		5:46
3.	"Reflection"		4:39
4.	"At Sunrise"		3:17
5.	"Africa, Africa"		3:18
6.	"Crossings"		4:27
7.	"The East"		5:07
8.	"Antarctica"		4:27
9.	"Dreams"		3:16
10.	"Stones"		3:17
11.	"Celebration"		3:29
12.	"2000 Passions"		7:22
Total length:			52:30

=== Personnel ===
- Tan Dun – composer, conductor, producer
- Charles Harbutt – engineer, post production
- Mary Lou Humphrey – liner notes
- Photonica – photographer
- FPG International – photographer
- Grace Row – producer

== See also ==
- ABC 2000 Today, the commercial American broadcast
- CBC News 2000 Today, the Canadian broadcast
- Millennium Eve: Celebrate 2000, the Irish broadcast
- Millennium Live, the supposed nemesis of the successful 2000 Today broadcast
- New Year's Eve
