= Aarma =

Estonian family name

Aarma or Äärma is an Estonian surname. Notable people with the surname include:

- Eevald Äärma (1911–2005), Estonian pole vaulter
- Jüri Aarma (1951–2019), Estonian actor, musician and stage actor
- Kiur Aarma (born 1975), Estonian television journalist
