= CBC News 2000 Today =

CBC coverage of the turn of the 20th century

- Also known as: 2000 Today
- Presented by: Peter Mansbridge; Laurie Brown; Alison Smith; Rex Murphy
- Country of origin: Canada

Production
- Production locations: Canadian Broadcasting Centre, Toronto
- Running time: 25 hours and 38 minutes

Original release
- Network: CBC Television; CBC Newsworld
- Release: December 31, 1999 – January 1, 2000

CBC 2000 Today is a CBC News' special programming covering the new millennium celebrations around the world from December 31, 1999, into January 1, 2000, as part of the 2000 Today programming in Canada. Peter Mansbridge anchored the 25 1/2 hours of broadcast from the Canadian Broadcasting Centre in Toronto. CBC temporarily converted the atrium into a type of "Millennium time studios" that included a desk, where a standing Mansbridge spent most of his time, a news studio, where Mansbridge would interview guests, and a makeshift Canadian Broadcasting Centre where CBC News staffers would follow the latest developments.

== Broadcast highlights ==
Originally, the name of the broadcast was 2000 Today, but it was officially retitled as CBC 2000 Today because CBC Television joined 60 other nations, all celebrating the dawn of the new millennium. The network was part of the 2000 Today consortium that included the BBC in the United Kingdom, ATV in Hong Kong, RCTI in Indonesia, RTM in Malaysia, CCTV in China, TCS and Singapore Television Twelve in Singapore, ABC in Australia, TV Asahi in Japan, MBC in South Korea, SABC in South Africa, TVE in Spain, Rede Record in Brazil, GMA Network in the Philippines, RTL in Germany, RTP in Portugal, TV3 in New Zealand, Televisa and Once TV in Mexico, TVN in Chile, Radio-Canada in Quebec and the rest of the country, TF1 and France 2 in France, RAI in Italy, ABC, PBS, and WGBH, in the United States, RTÉ in Ireland, NRK in Norway, SF in Switzerland, and Canal 13 in Argentina. (The program was nonetheless consistently promoted under the same name).

This was by far the most comprehensive coverage of any of the broadcast networks in Canada.

Peter Mansbridge stayed on the air for the entire duration without a break using only commercial breaks and correspondent pieces to rest, eat, or change suits. He changed his wardrobe many times, including wearing a tuxedo when Canadians celebrate the new millennium at the end of 2000 Today's international feed after midnight celebrations were broadcast from Samoa at 6:00 AM EST.

The Millennium celebrations occurred nationwide from St. John's, Newfoundland to Ucluelet on Vancouver Island.

The broadcast featuring Canadians of the Century with Rex Murphy to bring you the polling results, and the marathon got a 1-hour break with a special New Year's Eve edition of the Royal Canadian Air Farce with 1999: Year of the Farce on CBC Television at 8:00 PM EST, while the news program can be seen on CBC Newsworld at the same time.

In Ottawa, Prime Minister Jean Chrétien presided over celebrations on Parliament Hill, which included artistic performances and a midnight fireworks display launched from the Peace Tower.

Fireworks were launched from the CN Tower and the waterfront in Toronto.

At least millions of Canadians tuned into some portions of CBC 2000 Today.

== Development ==
2000 Today was conceived as part of the Millennium celebrations, given the numerical significance of the change from 1999 to 2000.

The program was produced and televised by an international consortium of 60 broadcasters, including CBC and headed by the BBC in the United Kingdom and WGBH in the United States. The BBC provided the production hub for receiving and distributing the 78 international satellite feeds required for this broadcast.

== Production ==
CBC launched their millennium eve programming in November 1999. At the time the program was described as the largest, single television show in Canadian history. Up to 2,000 staff worked on the 2000 Today project worldwide, with hundreds of workers based at the Canadian Broadcasting Centre. In a television studio and the atrium were utilized while fibe outside satellite units, cameras in various locations worked to pull together an array of images from around both the country and the world. At the time, technicians at their sister network, Radio-Canada, were on strike in Quebec and Moncton. Transmissions in were seen as scheduled, but using only the main feed from the BBC, with a French voice-over. Also, as a consequence, 2000 footage from across the country was scarce on SRC's presentation, while footage from Quebec was not available at all worldwide (though the network did manage to get the only Quebec coverage on their own network—a video shot of midnight fireworks in Hull, Quebec, shot from Ottawa).
