= Telecentro =

Telecentro, also known as a telecentre, may refer to:

- Telecentro (Dominican Republic), a television channel in the Dominican Republic
- Telecentro Canal 6, now known as Repretel 6, a television channel in Costa Rica
