= Millennium Eve: Celebrate 2000 =

- Genre: New Year's television special
- Presented by: Miriam O'Callaghan; Mark Little; Geri Maye; Pat Kenny; Liz Bonnin; Joe Duffy
- Country of origin: Ireland
- Original language: English
- No. of episodes: 1

Production
- Executive producer: Noel Curran
- Production locations: RTÉ Television Centre, Donnybrook, Dublin 4

Original release
- Network: RTÉ One
- Release: 31 December 1999 – 1 January 2000

Millennium Eve: Celebrate 2000 is RTÉ's coverage of the end-of-millennium celebrations from 31 December 1999 into 1 January 2000. Part of the 2000 Today programming in the Ireland, a series of broadcasters presented various stages of the nineteen-hour broadcast.

== Development ==
2000 Today was conceived as part of the Millennium celebrations, given the numerical significance of the change from 1999 to 2000.

The programme was produced and televised by an international consortium of 60 broadcasters, including RTÉ and headed by the BBC in the United Kingdom and WGBH in the United States. It also included ATV in Hong Kong, RCTI in Indonesia, RTM in Malaysia, CCTV in China, TCS and Singapore Television Twelve in Singapore, ABC in Australia, TV Asahi in Japan, MBC in South Korea, SABC in South Africa, TVE in Spain, Rede Record in Brazil, GMA Network in the Philippines, RTL in Germany, RTP in Portugal, TV3 in New Zealand, Televisa and Once TV in Mexico, TVN in Chile, Radio-Canada in Quebec and the rest of the country, TF1 and France 2 in France, RAI in Italy, NRK in Norway, SF in Switzerland, El Trece in Argentina. (The program was nonetheless consistently promoted under the same name). The BBC provided the production hub for receiving and distributing the 78 international satellite feeds required for this broadcast.

== Production ==
One of the Millennium Candles, which were distributed to households across Ireland

RTÉ launched their millennium eve programming on 30 November 1999. At the time the programme was described as the largest, single television show in Irish history. Up to 5,000 staff worked on the 2000 Today project worldwide, with 500 workers based at the RTÉ Television Centre.

In all three television studios were utilised while four outside satellite units, forty cameras in twenty Irish locations worked to pull together an array of images from around both the country and globe. As part of a Reconciliation 2000 theme RTÉ and BBC Northern Ireland co-operated on several events during the broadcast.

== Programming ==
The first midnight celebrations in the South Pacific and reports from Jerusalem and Nazareth featured.

Time	Programme	Description
9:30am	Millennium Eve: Celebrate 2000	Miriam O'Callaghan began the international countdown on RTÉ.
1:10pm	RTÉ News and Weather	
1:20pm	Millennium Chorus	A special concert featuring Michael Crawford, Jennifer Holliday and Kathie Lee Gifford.
2:25pm	Millennium Eve: Celebrate 2000	Mark Little and Geri Maye presented further coverage from around the globe.
4:05pm	Millennium Bells	A special broadcast from St. Colman's Cathedral in Cobh, County Cork.
4:10pm	Last Lights Ceremony	Live coverage of the lighting of the special millennium candles, beginning at Áras an Uachtaráin.
5:00pm	Celebrate 2000	A programme of song and reflections from the Abbey of Multyfarnham and Áras an Uachtaráin.
6:30pm	RTÉ News and Weather	The main news stories by Bryan Dobson and Úna O'Hagan.
7:20pm	Celebrate 2000	Pat Kenny, Liz Bonnin and Joe Duffy presented a gala programme of music and chat from Studio 4.
9:00pm	RTÉ News: Nine O'Clock	The evening main news.
9:20pm	Celebrate 2000	Pat Kenny, Liz Bonnin and Joe Duffy presented the final leg of the countdown to midnight.

== Ratings ==
The Millennium Eve: Celebrate 2000 schedule reached 75 per cent of the people of Ireland, the equivalent of 2.6 million viewers. At midnight 74 per cent of the available audience were watching RTÉ One.
