= The Signal (radio program) =

The Signal is a Canadian radio program, which debuted on CBC Radio 2 on March 19, 2007 and had its final broadcast on September 2, 2017. Devoted to contemporary music and airing from 10 p.m. to 12 a.m., the program was hosted by Laurie Brown Mondays to Saturdays. The weekend version, which previously aired Friday to Sunday was hosted by Pat Carrabré until March 2009 (until this time Brown only hosted Monday to Thursday). Subsequently, Brown took over the Friday and Saturday edition of the show while the Sunday broadcast being replaced by The Strombo Show.
