= Millennium Live =

Cancelled television special celebrating the new millennium

Millennium Live was a cancelled and planned international television special, which was an unsuccessful attempt to broadcast an international celebration of the beginning of the Year 2000, or the so-called Millennium. Reports claimed that the show was to have involved broadcasters in up to 130 nations. Millennium Live: Humanity's Broadcast was going to compete against the 2000 Today international broadcast that was supported by ABC in the United States and led by BBC in the United Kingdom.

The programme was called off on 28 December 1999 when its organizers, the Millennium Television Network (MTN), announced that it had failed to obtain sufficient financing for the broadcast. MTN reportedly was not paying production and satellite companies for their services prior to the cancellation before MTN shelved their efforts to establish a global broadcast for the following New Year's Eve.

== History ==
The Millennium Television Network (MTN) was formed by Live Aid's American producer Hal Uplinger to prepare and conduct the broadcast. A series of early planning activities among international representatives reportedly occurred in Cannes in October 1998. Millennium Live was planned as a 24- or 25-hour broadcast from 11:00 UTC 31 December 1999.

Pax TV (now known as Ion Television) of the United States had the exclusive rights to broadcast the show which they billed as Pax Millennium Live: A New World's Eve.

Scheduled musical guests included Aerosmith, Bee Gees, Blondie, Chicago, Phil Collins, Destiny's Child, Ricky Martin, 'N Sync, The Pretenders, Sting, Santana and 10,000 Maniacs. Bryan Adams, Simply Red and the Spice Girls were also sought as featured artists.

New Year's Eve celebrations from various worldwide locations were to have been seen on the show. Angelica Castro (Chile), Carmen Electra (US), Ramzi Malouki (France), and Zam Nkosi (South Africa) were also scheduled as a program hosts for the represented nations. The studios of a television special were to have been hosted in Los Angeles on a set contained in a 90-foot geodesic dome at Manhattan Beach in the United States.

The program was cancelled on 28 December 1999 with an announcement that MTN had failed to obtain sufficient financing for the broadcast. MTN reportedly was not paying production and satellite companies for their services prior to the cancellation. Pax aired a series of movies in Millennium Live's place, and MTN never materialised its reported plans to establish a global broadcast for the following New Year's Eve on the real Millennium (2001).

== Broadcasters ==
The following broadcasters were reported as participants in Millennium Live:

- Australia: Nine Network
- Brazil: Rede Bandeirantes
- Canada: CTV, TVA and MuchMoreMusic
- Chile: Chilevisión
- Estonia: TV1
- France: France Télévisions
- Germany: Sat.1
- Hong Kong: STAR TV, ATV and TVB
- India: Zee TV
- Italy: RAI
- Japan: Fuji Television and Vibe TV (now MTV Japan)
- Mexico: Televisa and TV Azteca
- New Zealand: TV3
- Philippines: ABS-CBN
- Portugal: SIC
- South Africa: SABC
- South Korea: KBS
- Spain: Telecinco
- Turkey: NTV
- United Kingdom: ITV
- United States: Pax (now Ion Television)
- Venezuela: Venevisión

Note: Hong Kong's ATV and Italy's RAI were the only broadcasters that moved to the 2000 Today broadcast.

== See also ==
- 2000 Today – the successful international television special, which was broadcast in 78 countries (including broadcasters from the cancelled Millennium Live TV special)
