= Countrywise =

- Genre: Documentary
- Presented by: Ben Fogle (2013—16); Liz Bonnin (2013—16); Paul Heiney (2009–2016); Mike Robinson (Kitchen series)
- Country of origin: United Kingdom
- Original language: English
- No. of series: 6 (Regular series); 4 (Kitchen series)
- No. of episodes: 92 (Regular episodes); 24 (Kitchen episodes); 5 (Specials)

Production
- Executive producer: Mark Scantlebury
- Producers: Mark Challender; Ian Griffiths
- Running time: 30–60 minutes (inc. adverts)
- Production company: ITV Studios

Original release
- Network: ITV
- Release: 12 March 2009 – 22 December 2016

Related
- Countryfile

Countrywise (known as Countrywise: Guide to Britain since 2016) is a British television series on ITV, which looks at the best of Britain's coast and country. The programme is currently presented by Ben Fogle and Liz Bonnin.

== Format ==
Classical historian Bettany Hughes formerly appeared on the programme, and was introduced as the "Countrywise historian".

The fourth series of the programme began broadcast on 25 June 2012, when it came from the Isle of Man and mentioned the Manx cat. A more recent edition of the programme has come from Ireland. This edition of the programme mentioned how the newest member of the Countrywise team has been the programme's scientist, Charlotte Uhlenbroek, who discussed Finn MacCool when the programme was in Ireland.

In late July 2012, the programme was broadcast in Pembrokeshire, Wales, where it visited the smallest city in the United Kingdom, that of St. Davids.

=== 2013 return ===
The show returned on 2 September 2013 with presenter Paul Heiney and two new co-hosts, Ben Fogle and Liz Bonnin. The same format continued for the sixth and seventh series in 2014 and 2015. Paul Heiney did not return to the show for the eighth series in 2016. Bonnin and Fogle now present Countrywise.

Since 2016, the show has been renamed Countrywise: Guide to Britain.

== Episodes ==
Series	Start date	End date	Episodes
1	12 March 2009	30 December 2009	36
2	29 March 2010	4 October 2010	26
3	5 April 2011	5 July 2011	12
4	25 June 2012	27 August 2012	10
5	2 September 2013	21 October 2013	8
6	27 October 2014	29 December 2014	8
7	19 October 2015	28 December 2015	8
8	9 September 2016	22 December 2016	15

=== Specials ===
Special	Original Air Date
Countrywise at War	11 September 2010
Countrywise: Christmas Special	22 December 2010
Countrywise: The Real Downton Abbey	18 September 2011
Countrywise: Jubilee Special	29 May 2012
Countrywise: Winter Wonderland	25 December 2015
Countrywise: Secret Wild Places	17 August 2016

== On-air team ==
=== Main presenters ===
- Paul Heiney (2009–2016)
- Ben Fogle (2013—2016)
- Liz Bonnin (2013—2016)

=== Reporters ===
- Bettany Hughes (formerly)
- Charlotte Uhlenbroek (formerly)

=== Countrywise Kitchen presenters ===
- Paul Heiney
- Mike Robinson

=== Countrywise Kitchen ===
Countrywise launched a new series in December 2010 called Countrywise Kitchen, about foraging for food and food connected with different parts of the country. The edition broadcast on 10 December 2010 mentioned gathering mushrooms, and mentioned the cep mushroom.

It was a spin-off from the regular series and was co-presented by Paul Heiney and Mike Robinson between 2010 and 2012.

Series	Start date	End date	Episodes
1	3 December 2010	20 December 2010	5
2	11 July 2011	29 August 2011	8
3	12 December 2011	28 December 2011	3
4	13 March 2012	15 May 2012	8

== See also ==
- Countryfile
