= Liz Bonnin =

French-born Irish television presenter (born 1976)

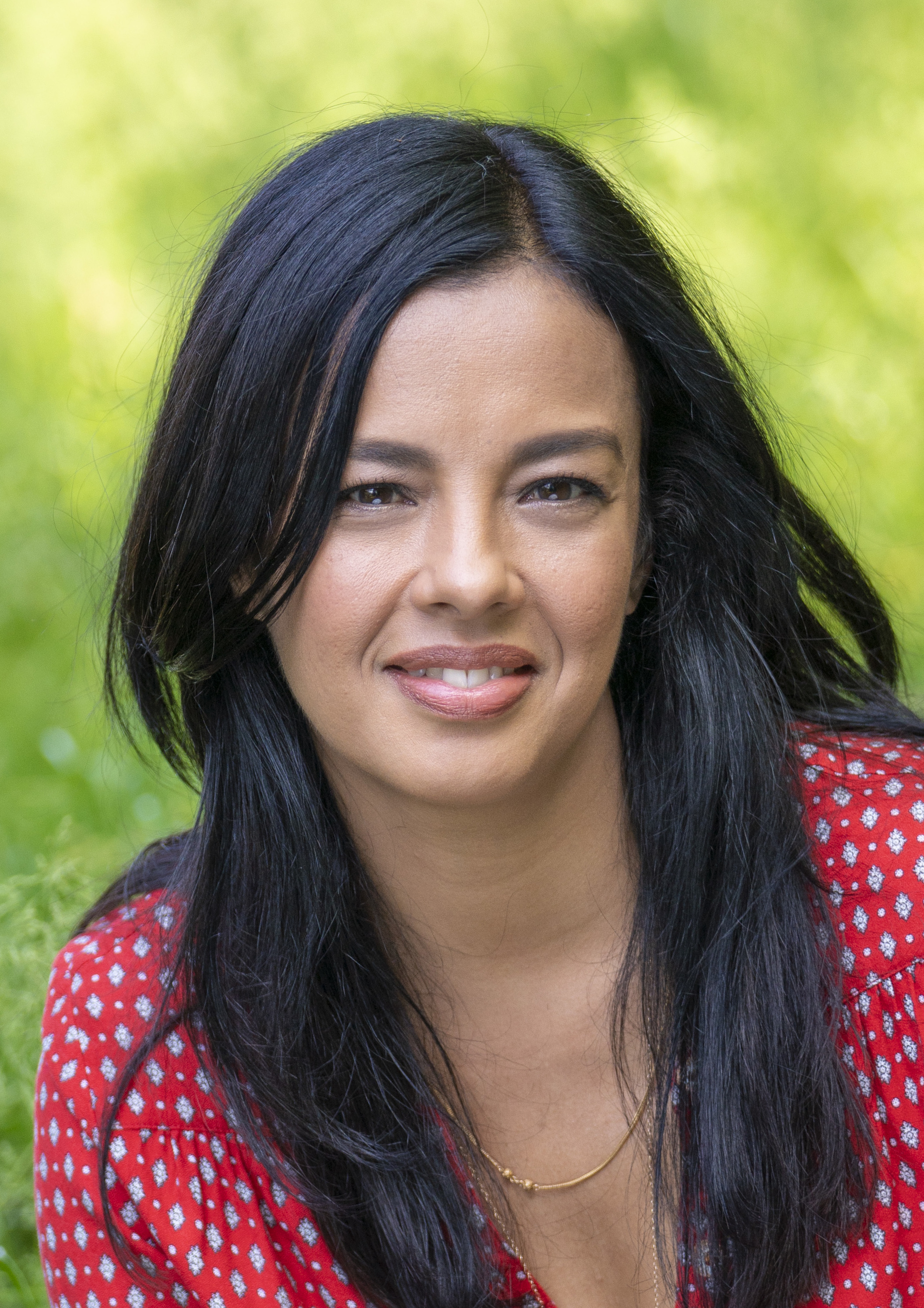
- Bonnin in 2018
- Born: Elizabeth Bonnin; 16 September 1976 (age 50); Paris, France
- Citizenship: France; Ireland
- Education: Trinity College Dublin (BA); Royal Veterinary College (MSc)
- Occupation: Television presenter
- Years active: 1999–present
- Musical career
- Origin: Paris, France
- Genre: Pop
- Instrument: Vocals
- Label: Polydor
- Website: www.lizbonnin.com

Elizabeth Bonnin (born 16 September 1976) is a French-Irish science, wildlife and natural history presenter, who has worked on television in both Ireland and the United Kingdom. She presented morning show RI:SE and music show Top of the Pops in the early 2000s.

She is best known for presenting wildlife and science programmes including Galapagos, How the Earth Works, Animals in Love, Stargazing Live, Blue Planet Live, Cats v Dogs: Which is Best? and Should We Close Our Zoos?. She co-presented the BBC factual series Bang Goes the Theory from 2009 until 2014 and since 2013, has co-presented Countrywise for ITV. In 2019, she presented Meat: A Threat to our Planet? on BBC One. She is regarded as one of the most prominent natural world presenters in Britain.

== Early life and education ==
Bonnin was born in Paris, France, to a Trinidadian mother, of Indian and Portuguese descent, and a French-Martiniquan father, who was a dentist. Her family moved to Ireland when she was nine years old.

Bonnin has a bachelor's degree in biochemistry from Trinity College Dublin, She also holds a master's degree in wild animal biology and conservation from the Zoological Society of London and the Royal Veterinary College (2008), for which she tracked tigers in Nepal. She continues to work on big cat conservation programmes at the Zoological Society of London.

== Career ==
Bonnin began her career singing backing vocals with The Pale before joining an Irish girl pop group named Chill, who signed to Polydor but broke up before recording. The band had performed on Dustin the Turkey's third album Faith of Our Feathers, duetting on "We Are Family". She was offered a job hosting the IRMA Awards which led to presenting roles on RTÉ Television in Ireland, on The Den (including Den 2), Telly Bingo, Millennium Eve: Celebrate 2000 and for two years, Off the Rails with Fiona McShane. At the time she was in a relationship with the publisher John Ryan. In 2002, she moved to London to present on a number of TV channels.

In 2002, she became one of the presenters of the Channel 4 morning show RI:SE, specialising in reporting on entertainment-related stories. In the same year she became a regular presenter on Top of the Pops in the UK.

In 2004, Bonnin was locked in a giant kennel along with MPs Paul Burstow, Evan Harris and Ivan Henderson and actress Liza Goddard, BBC Newsround presenter Lizzie Greenwood and DJ Becky Jago in a stunt to launch the annual RSPCA Week to raise awareness and funds.

Since 2005, Bonnin has been involved in science broadcasting. She presented the show Gadgets, Gadgets, Gadgets in 2005 and co-presented the BBC science series Bang Goes the Theory on BBC One from 2009 until 2014. In 2008, Bonnin presented a documentary series Science Friction on RTÉ One which looked at taboos in discussions of scientific topics (such as paedophilia and nuclear power) in Ireland. She also contributed to BBC Two's series on the work of the London Natural History Museum, Museum of Life.

In October 2010, she joined the cast of Autumnwatch and in January 2011, she presented segments of BBC Two's Stargazing Live from various areas of Hawaii including atop Mauna Kea. In May 2011, she co-presented BBC One's Egypt's Lost Cities.

Her programme on animal intelligence, Super Smart Animals, was filmed in mid-2011 in Mexico, Brazil, Thailand, Australia and Germany, and broadcast in February 2012. Bonin has presented several Horizon specials on BBC Two which have covered topics ranging from looking at the future of technology to reporting on the sustainability of zoos.

In June 2013, she presented the two-part documentary Operation Snow Tiger, working alongside Russian and other scientists in the Ussuriysk Reserve in the Russian Far East. Since 2013 Bonnin has been a presenter of the ITV series Countrywise, alongside Paul Heiney and Ben Fogle. In November 2013 she presented Animal Odd Couples on BBC One. She was a co-presenter along with Martin Pepper on the series How the Earth Works that aired on the Discovery Channel in the USA starting on 10 September 2013.

In October 2014, she presented a three-part Horizon series looking into the life of cats. In February 2015, she presented a two-part documentary series called Animals in Love on BBC One, looking at the emotional lives of animals including elephants, monkeys, geese and alligators.

In August 2015, alongside Matt Baker and Steve Backshall, she co-hosted a series of three programmes for BBC One, Big Blue Live, featuring marine life in Monterey Bay, California. Early 2016 saw Bonnin return to Stargazing Live, where she reported from the European Space Agency's astronaut training centre. She also co-presented the BBC Two series Cats v Dogs: Which is Best? with Chris Packham.

Starting on 30 March 2017, Bonnin presented a new BBC One series called Galapagos exploring the species found on the islands and in the seas around. In July 2017, she co-presented Wild Alaska Live with Matt Baker and Steve Backshall on BBC One. In 2018, Bonnin presented a one-off documentary for BBC One called Drowning In Plastic, looking at the problem of marine plastic pollution. In 2020 she presented a programme looking at different species of Penguins titled Penguins: Meet the Family.

In November 2023 she presented a four-part - one episode for each region - series for BBC Two titled Liz Bonnin's Wild Caribbean showing the ecosystems and wildlife in the Caribbean and centring and taking part in various conservation and wildlife rehabilitation initiatives and local community connections with said ecosystems and wildlife.

In January 2024, she joined a group of palaeontologists in Wyoming, USA to present Secrets of the Jurassic Dinosaurs for BBC Two.

In February 2024, Bonnin launched a podcast titled 'Dead River' telling the story of the Mariana dam disaster in Brazil. The podcast covers the history of mining in Brazil, the day that the dam collapsed, and the story of the victims who are still fighting for justice and are now embroiled in a legal battle against the owners of the dam, BHP and Vale.

== Personal life ==
Bonnin grew up with her older sister Benni, while she said that "I was extremely close to my granny, who passed away in 2003." She has moved back to London. Bonnin featured on the BBC's Who Do You Think You Are? on 8 December 2016. In the programme she traced the ancestry of both her parents on the Caribbean islands of Trinidad and Martinique.

Bonnin is a role model for EDF Energy's Pretty Curious programme, which is aimed at encouraging teenage girls to study science-based subjects at school. She has said in a 2016 interview, "FHM offered me a spread but I said no."

On 5 January 2021, Bonnin announced that her mother had died over the Christmas 2020 period after contracting COVID-19.

== Filmography ==
Television

Year	Title	Roles	Channel
1999–2000	Millennium Eve: Celebrate 2000	Co-presenter	RTÉ One
2000–?	Off the Rails	Co-presenter	RTÉ One
2002–?	RI:SE	Co-presenter	Channel 4
2002–2003	Top of the Pops	Co-presenter	BBC One
2003	Never Mind the Buzzcocks	Guest	BBC Two
2004- ?	Euromillions Draw	Presenter	Sky One
2004–2005	Wild Trials	Presenter	
2005–?	Gadgets, Gadgets, Gadgets	Co-presenter	
2008	Science Friction	Presenter	RTÉ One
2009–2014	Bang Goes the Theory	Co-presenter	BBC One
2009–2010	Country Tracks	Co-presenter	BBC Two
2010	Museum of Life	Co-presenter	BBC Two
2010–2011	Autumnwatch	Guest presenter	BBC Two
2011—	Stargazing Live	Co-presenter	BBC One/BBC Two
2011	Egypt's Lost Cities	Co-presenter	BBC One
2011	Springwatch	Guest presenter	BBC Two
2012	Super Smart Animals	Presenter	BBC One
2012	Horizon: The Transit of Venus	Presenter	BBC Two
2013	Tomorrow's World: A Horizon Special	Presenter	BBC Two
2013	Operation Snow Tiger	Presenter	BBC Two
2013—	Countrywise	Co-presenter	ITV
2013	Animal Odd Couples	Presenter	BBC One
2013	How the Earth Works	Co-presenter	Discovery Channel
2014	Cat Watch 2014: The New Horizon Experiment	Presenter	BBC Two
2014	Animals Through The Night: Sleepover At The Zoo	Co-presenter	BBC Four
2015	Big Blue Live	Co-presenter	BBC One
2015	Animals in Love	Presenter	BBC One
2015	India: Nature's Wonderland	Co-presenter	BBC Two
2016	Cats v Dogs: Which is Best?	Co-presenter	BBC Two
2016	Horizon – Should We Close Our Zoos?	Presenter	BBC Two
2016	Nature's Epic Journeys	Presenter	BBC One
2017	Galapagos	Presenter	BBC One
2017	Wild Alaska Live	Co-presenter	BBC One
2018	Drowning In Plastic	Presenter	BBC One
2019	Blue Planet Live	Co-presenter	BBC One
2019	Would I Lie to You?	Guest	BBC One
2019	Snow Animals	Presenter	BBC One
2019	Meat: A Threat to our Planet?	Presenter	BBC One
2020	Penguins: Meet the Family	Narrator	BBC One
2020-2021	For The Love Of Britain	Co-presenter	ITV
2021	Our Wild Adventures	Guest contributor	BBC Two
2022	Our Changing Planet	Co-presenter	BBC One
2022	The Island – 1.8 Billion Years in the Making	Presenter	RTÉ
2023	Secrets of the Jurassic Dinosaurs	Presenter	BBC Two
2023	Arctic From Above	Presenter	Sky Nature
2023	Liz Bonnin’s Wild Caribbean	Presenter	BBC Two
2024	Our Changing Planet: Restoring Our Reefs	Co-presenter	BBC Two
2024	Animal Genius	Presenter	National Geographic
2025	Our Changing Planet: Restoring Our Rivers	Co-presenter	BBC One
2025	Amazing Expeditions with Liz Bonnin: Ultimate Galapágos Adventure	Presenter	National Geographic
2026	David Attenborough's 100 Years on Planet Earth	On-screen participant	BBC One
