= Andrea Stretton =

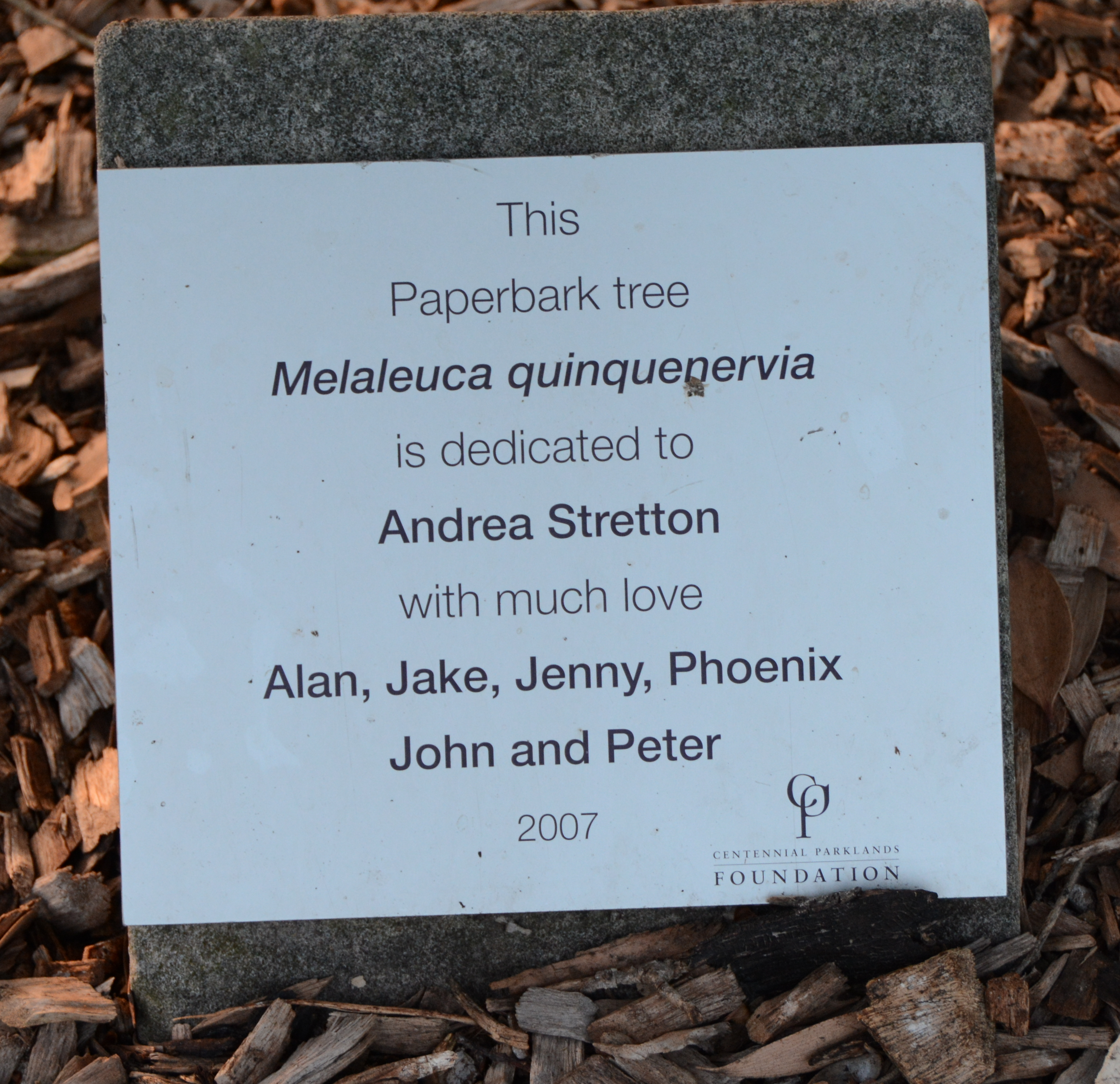
Dedication of a tree to Andrea Stretton, Centennial Park, Sydney

Andrea Stretton (11 March 1952 – 16 November 2007) was an Australian arts journalist and television presenter. She was known as a major advocate for the arts in Australia.

== Career ==
Andrea Stretton began her major network broadcasting career in 1985 when she took a job with SBS Radio. She remained at SBS television and radio for more than a decade. She also worked as a series editor and presenter for the SBS television programs The Book Show and Masterpiece.

Stretton went on to present on Australian Broadcasting Corporation's Sunday Afternoon, a network arts program, from 1998 until 2001.

Stretton's interest in the arts also extended into the publishing world as a long time book reviewer for The Sydney Morning Herald. She was a contributing book editor for Art & Australia magazine. She was also a well-known figure at Australian writers' festivals, including the Sydney Writers Week.

She was awarded the Order of Arts and Letters in 2002 by the government of France for her contributions to the arts. She was the creative director of the 1998 and 1999 Olympic arts festivals.

== Death ==
Stretton died of lung cancer at Prince of Wales Hospital in Randwick on 16 November 2007 at the age of 55. She was survived by her partner Alan, her son, and her granddaughter.

Her funeral, which was held at St Canice's Roman Catholic Church in Sydney, included readings from the Tibetan Book of the Dead and T. S. Eliot.
