= Millennium celebrations =

Celebrations of the year 2000

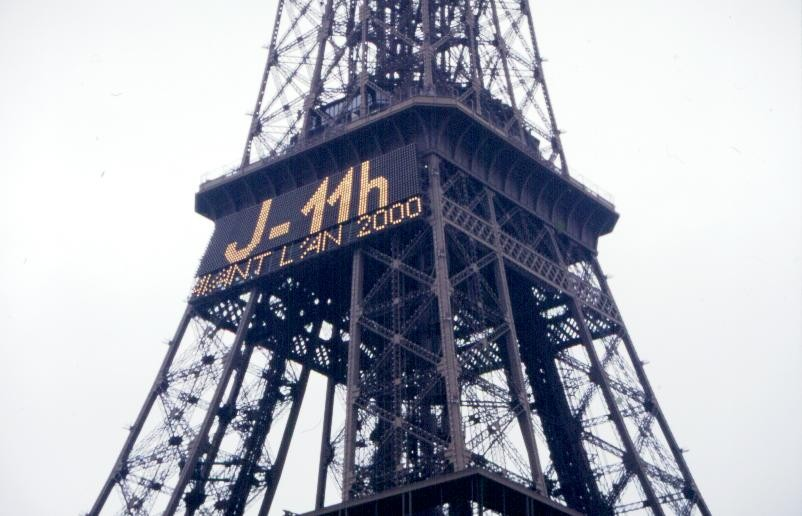
Millennium countdown on the Eiffel Tower, Paris, France

The millennium celebrations were a worldwide, coordinated series of events to celebrate and commemorate the end of 1999 and the start of 2000 as well as the end of 2000 and the start of 2001 in the Gregorian calendar. The celebrations were held as marking the end of the 2nd millennium, the 20th century, and the 200th decade, and the start of the 3rd millennium, the 21st century, and the 201st decade (although the start and end points of such periods had been disputed). Countries around the globe held official festivities in the weeks and months leading up to the date, such as those organised in the United States by the White House Millennium Council, and most major cities produced firework displays at midnight. Equally, many private venues, cultural and religious centres held events. and a diverse range of memorabilia was created, including souvenir postage stamps.

As with every New Year's Eve, many events were timed with the stroke of midnight in the time zone of the location. There were also many events associated with the dawn on 1 January. An international television broadcast called 2000 Today was produced by a consortium of 60 broadcasters, while an alternative program Millennium Live was cancelled two days before the event.

Several countries in the middle of the Pacific Ocean, and hence close to the International Date Line made arguments they were the first to enter the new millennium. Variously, the Chatham Islands, New Zealand, Tonga, Fiji and Kiribati all laid claims to the status – by moving the dateline itself, the temporary institution of daylight saving time, and claiming the "first territory", "first land", "first inhabited land" or "first city" to see the new year.

== Events ==
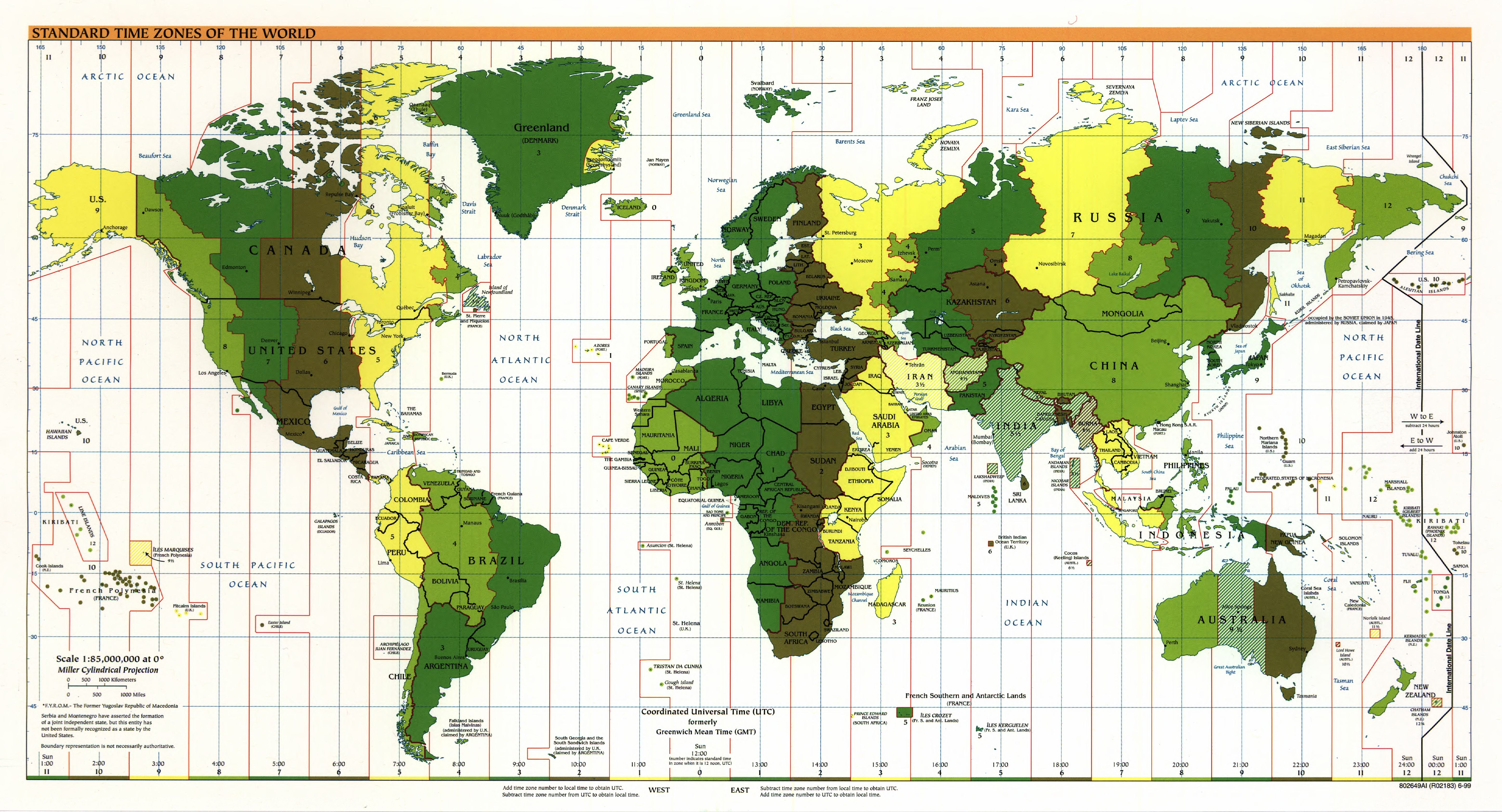
Standard Time Zones Map from 1999; celebrations occurred from right to left.

=== UTC+14 ===
The US Navy submarine Topeka positioned itself 400 metres (1,300 ft) underwater, straddling both the International Date Line and the Equator.

At Caroline Island in the mid-Pacific, renamed as "Millennium Island", the Republic of Kiribati claimed the first land to see the new millennium.

In Tonga, a midnight service was held consisting of a choir recitation of Hallelujah. The country released an official millennium CD, prefaced with a greeting by King Tāufaʻāhau Tupou IV.

=== UTC+13:45 and +13 ===
On the Chatham Islands (UTC+13:45) there was a Māori blessing. "As they faced the Pacific Ocean, a beacon was lit and school children sang."

In Auckland (UTC+13:00), a fireworks display on the harbour made New Zealand the first industrial nation to celebrate the year 2000, being just west of the International Date Line.

=== UTC+12 ===
Fiji hosted a concert by American musician George Clinton.

=== UTC+11 ===
Sydney, the host city of the 2000 Summer Olympics, held a large fireworks display centering on the Harbour Bridge, with the locally famous graffito Eternity being recreated. For the first time in its history, the Sydney Opera House precinct was almost completely cordoned off from the public. Instead, tickets costing as much as A$2,000 each were being sold for Opera House parties. However, public transport and access was available to view the fireworks on the Bridge, which included a "waterfall" effect.

=== UTC+10 ===
Adelaide's celebrations were at their Central Business District with a special presentation before the countdown and many fireworks. Adelaide was on UTC+10:30 during daylight saving time.

Brisbane's celebrations were broadcast live on 2000 Today.

=== UTC+9 ===
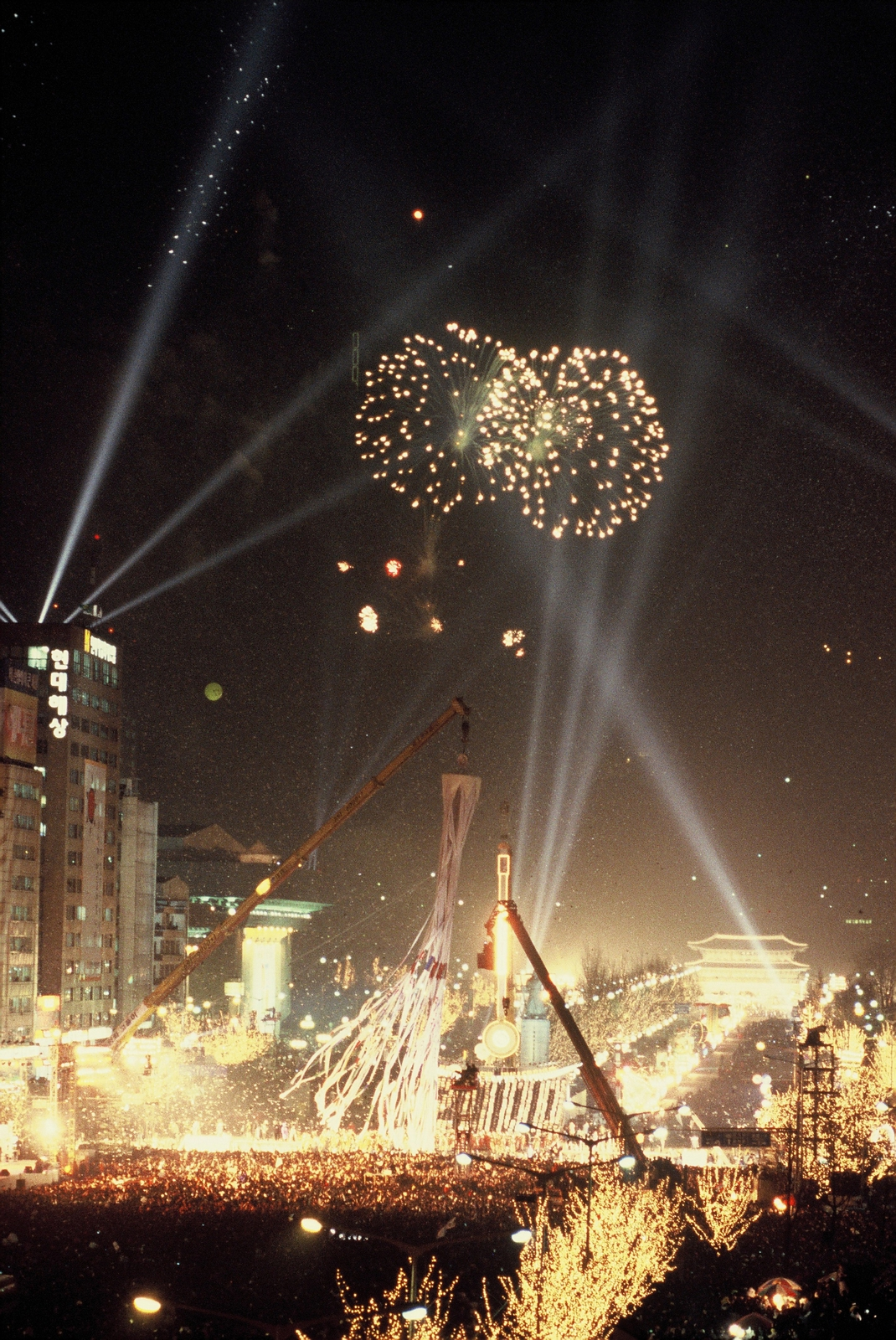
Fireworks over Seoul, South Korea on 1 January 2000

Japan and South Korea hosted a joint millennium celebration. In Tokyo, there was a series of concerts, which included the 50th edition of NHK Kōhaku Uta Gassen at the NHK Hall and Johnny's Countdown Live at the Tokyo Dome, as well as a fireworks display. At midnight, temple bells across Japan were rung 108 times to "dispel the evils of mankind".

The Japanese heavy metal band Seikima-II played its last concert "The Doomsday" before its first breakup on 31 December. A major part of the band's fictional storyline was a prophecy stating that they would conquer the world before breaking up in 1999, with the name of the band itself being a pun meaning "the end of the century" in Japanese. Following the conclusion of the concert at 23:59:59 on 31 December (a second before midnight), the band disbanded and could be seen disappearing into a portal of light leaving the stage.

=== UTC+8 ===
In China, the traditional Chinese New Year did not start until 5 February of that year, however celebrations were still held in Beijing alongside fireworks and dragon dances. At midnight, Chinese paramount leader Jiang Zemin lit a flame dedicated to the history of Chinese civilization.

In Hong Kong, at eight minutes to midnight, film star Jackie Chan led a group of singers, and at the stroke of midnight, a fireworks display began.

In the Philippines, millennium parties simultaneously began in different parts of the country. President Joseph Estrada and top government officials joined celebrations at Rizal Park, which was broadcast on ABS-CBN and other Filipino television networks. At the Ayala Millennium Center, Regine Velasquez sang the Philippine Millennium theme song "Written in the Sand" at the top of the Peninsula Manila at about ten minutes to midnight as part of the Philippine presentation on 2000 Today, which was broadcast on GMA Network.

In Singapore, a pop trio consisting of Fann Wong, Tanya Chua and Elsa Lin performed a millennium song for Singapore, entitled Moments of Magic.

=== UTC+7 ===
Fireworks for the Vietnamese New Year in February were cancelled; in turn, Ho Chi Minh City organized a countdown party on 31 December at 10 pm, culminating in fireworks which began at midnight.

=== UTC+6 to +5:30 ===
In India (UTC+5:30), on New Year's Eve, fireworks were observed in the capital New Delhi. This was overshadowed by the return of Indian Airlines Flight 814's passengers and crew, who arrived home from Afghanistan after being held hostage for a week.

One way the new millennium was celebrated in India was with the grand opening of the Thiruvalluvar Statue, a 41-metre (135 ft) stone statue in Kanyakumari, Tamil Nadu, depicting Valluvar, a Tamil speaking poet, philosopher and author of the Tirukkural, a book on morality. Both Valluvar and the Tirukkural are treated with reverence by Tamil speakers regardless of political or religious background, with the Tirukkural considered the most important work written in Tamil.

=== UTC+5 to +3 ===
Boris Yeltsin's New Year Address in which he announced his resignation (in Russian)

Vladimir Putin's New Year address

The Burj Al Arab tower in Dubai (UTC+4) was opened on 1 December to mark the new millennium.

In Russia (UTC+3), Moscow's government and the Russian national government sponsored parties across the city. Celebrations were held at the Spasskaya Tower to ring in the new millennium.

The President of Russia Boris Yeltsin unexpectedly announced his resignation during his annual Presidential New Year Address. For the rest of the day and into 2000, prime minister Vladimir Putin served as acting president, and he gave a New Year address of his own. Putin would later be elected president for a full four-year term in March 2000.

=== UTC+2 ===
Former president of South Africa Nelson Mandela lit a candle in his former cell at Robben Island at the stroke of midnight.

Athens held a fireworks display over the Acropolis and a televised choir sang the Olympic anthem, a Byzantine anthem and the Greek national anthem.

In Egypt, a concert entitled The Twelve Dreams of the Sun with music by Jean-Michel Jarre was held at the Giza pyramid complex. A wave of persecution against the Coptic minority started on 31 December and continued into January as a massacre. It was the result of an argument between a Coptic Christian merchant and a Muslim customer in Kosheh, Upper Egypt, which led to an incident on New Year's Eve when relatives of the Muslim customer targeted Christian-owned shops and homes to be looted, destroyed, and burned. This then turned into an anti-Coptic riot and the police were not able to control the crowd. This riot continued throughout the night and into the new millennium when it culminated on 2 January with a massacre of 20 Coptic Christians. One Muslim was also accidentally shot dead by a fellow Muslim.

In Jerusalem, and particularly at the Mount of Olives, fears that doomsday fanatics "could try to trigger an apocalypse prompted one of Israel's biggest peacetime police operations."

=== UTC+1 ===
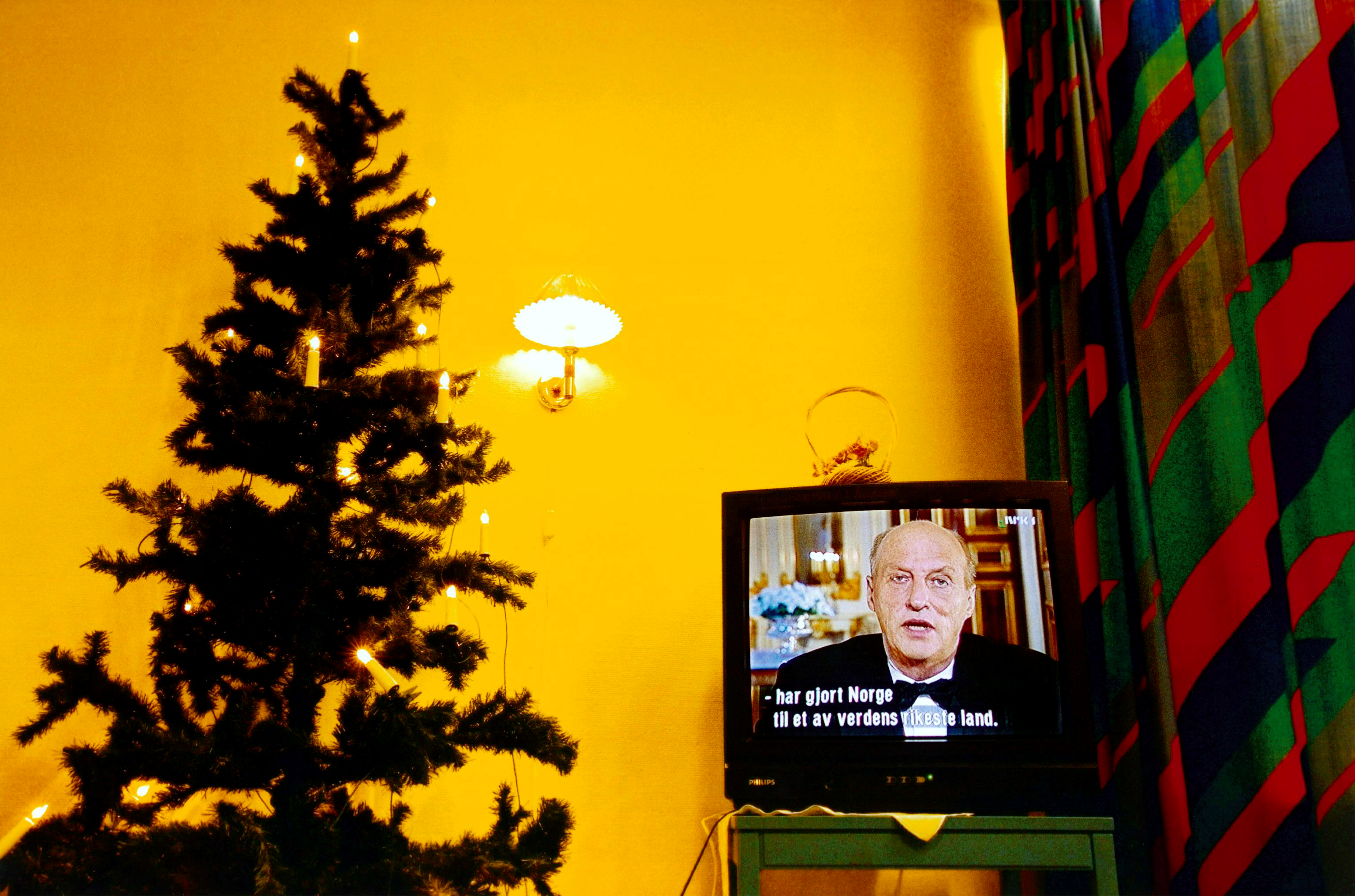
A television screen shows King Harald V of Norway addressing the Norwegian people.

Paris was the focal point of celebrations in France where searchlights and 20,000 strobe lights for the event were installed on the Eiffel Tower. They remained in operation until June 2003, when they were replaced by another installation.

In Switzerland, a new constitution, which was approved in a referendum in April 1999, came into effect at midnight on 1 January.

In Madrid, star-shaped balloons were set up at midnight on top of the Casa de Correos building in Puerta del Sol Square.

In Stockholm, the band Europe performed a concert to celebrate the new millennium. This was the first concert played by the band since 1992 when they went on hiatus, and they were brought back together due to a request to perform such a concert. For the first and (so far only) time, both of their lead guitarists, John Norum and Kee Marcello played together, as both of them had accepted the offer of playing with the band that night. The two songs performed, "Rock the Night" and "The Final Countdown", the band's two biggest hits, had extra meaning due to the night they were sung on.

In the Netherlands, national radio station Radio 2 broadcast the Top 2000, a multi-day compilation of the twentieth century's greatest hits, to inaugurate the new millennium. It was also a response to the faltering ratings of the station during Christmastime due to the competition of commercial radio stations dedicating themselves to holiday music. The order of the songs was decided by public votes, and the song voted number one ("Bohemian Rhapsody" by Queen) was played immediately before midnight on 1 January 2000. The Top 2000 was a massive success and has since become an annual tradition.

In Vatican City, Pope John Paul II led a blessing in St Peter's Square.

=== UTC±0 ===
In London, attention focused around Big Ben, as well as the opening of the Millennium Dome attended by Queen Elizabeth II, Prime Minister Tony Blair and his wife Cherie. A huge fireworks display, called the "River of Fire", went along 4 miles (6.4 km) of the River Thames. Also in London, the computer generated music piece Longplayer by Jem Finer started at midnight. Longplayer is designed to last 1000 years without ever repeating; the tune will end on 31 December 2999.

In Cardiff, Wales, the Manic Street Preachers held a concert at the Millennium Stadium. Entitled "Manic Millennium", it was attended by 57,000 fans and led to the release of Leaving the 20th Century. The final song, A Design for Life, was broadcast live worldwide.

At noon on 1 January, the "Ring In 2000" event took place across the United Kingdom, which aimed to ring every church bell in the country simultaneously. The Millennium Commission awarded £3 million in grants to repair or replace many old and inoperable bells, and years of planning (with the support of Andrew Lloyd Webber's Open Churches Trust) were required to recruit and train a sufficient number of volunteers. An estimated 95 per cent of the country's 45,000 church bells were successfully rung that day.

The Irish national radio and television organisation RTÉ produced a marathon 19-hour broadcast called Millennium Eve: Celebrate 2000, while the BBC in the United Kingdom headed an international 28-hour event known as 2000 Today.

The Spanish royal family stayed at the Royal Residence of La Mareta in Lanzarote, in the Canary Islands, to celebrate the new millennium. One member, Princess María de las Mercedes of Bourbon-Two Sicilies, the mother of King Juan Carlos I, died of a heart attack there on 2 January at the age of 89. As a result, seven days of national mourning were declared.

=== UTC–1 and UTC–2 ===
Rio de Janeiro (UTC−2) hosted the millennium celebrations along its beaches, attracting over four million people, with the largest being at Copacabana, with at least 2.5 million people in attendance. The celebration included an 18-minute fireworks display launched from ten different locations, creating a spectacular show that illuminated the city's famous shoreline.

=== UTC–3 ===
Argentina's celebration was centered in Ushuaia, the southernmost city in the world, with a tango performance by Julio Bocca and Eleonora Cassano, broadcast on ARTEAR (El Trece)'s El Día del Milenio and worldwide through the BBC-led 2000 Today.

=== UTC–3:30 and −4 ===
In Newfoundland (UTC−3:30), a concert was held that was broadcast to thousands of Canadians as the island celebrated being the first place in North America to welcome the 21st century. Meanwhile, in Bermuda, celebrations were marked as the first Caribbean nation to crossover to the new millennium reached its highest at midnight.

=== UTC–5 ===
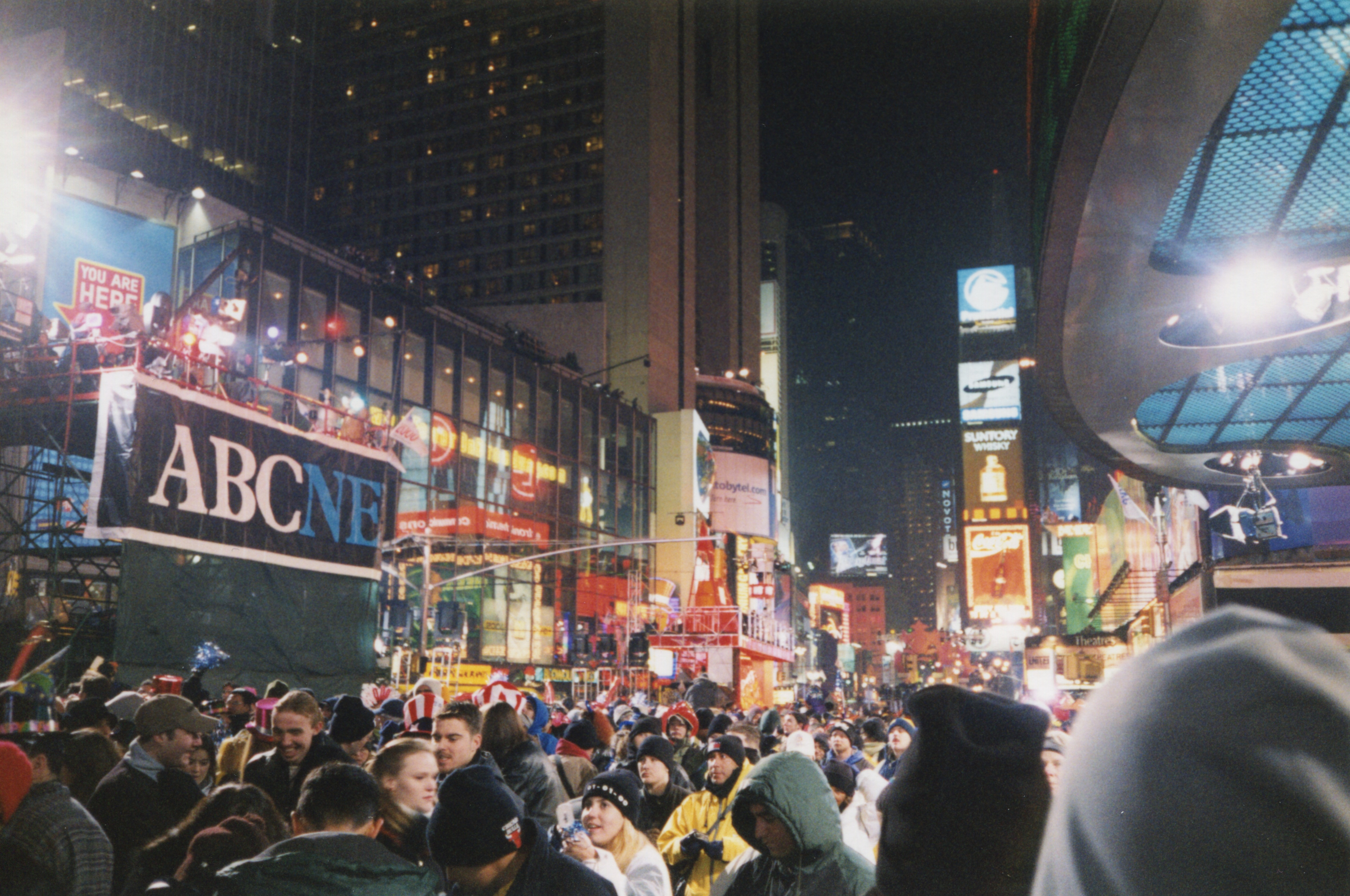
The millennium celebration with ABC News during the ABC 2000 Today broadcast in Times Square

In Ottawa, Canadian Prime Minister Jean Chrétien presided over celebrations on Parliament Hill, which included artistic performances and a midnight fireworks display launched from the Peace Tower.

Fireworks were launched from the CN Tower in Toronto.

Blues singer Richard "Hock" Walsh planned to have a concert in Peterborough with Rita Chiarelli on 31 December to celebrate the new millennium but died just hours before the concert was due to take place.

In Montreal, thousands attended a Celine Dion millennium concert at Molson Centre, which concluded her Let's Talk About Love World Tour.

In New York City's Times Square, a new Times Square Ball made of Waterford Crystal was commissioned and organizers expected a total attendance exceeding two million spectators. Times Square staged a series of live performances lasting nearly 24 hours, from 6:30 a.m. on 31 December to 6:10 a.m. on 1 January, with performances and musical styles from all over the world representing the countries that were entering the year 2000 at each hour. The ball drop was broadcast live during ABC 2000 Today with Peter Jennings and Dick Clark (whose regular New Year's Rockin' Eve did not air) in the United States, and worldwide via 2000 Today.

Meanwhile, elsewhere in the city, the Rose Center for Earth and Space, which would open to the public later in 2000, held a pre-opening black tie gala with performances by Philippe Petit, best known for his 1974 tightrope walk between the Twin Towers of the World Trade Center, and Eartha Kitt. At Madison Square Garden, Billy Joel was performing a special concert to celebrate the new millennium. Leading up to the first few moments of 2000, Joel sang a special song titled "2000 Years". After that, there was a brief countdown to the year 2000 and at the stroke of midnight, Joel sang "Auld Lang Syne", a song traditionally sung in the western world at the stroke of midnight in the first few seconds of the new year. The concert was released on an album titled "2000 Years: The Millennium Concert" in May 2000.

The jam band Phish played a millennium concert in Big Cypress, Florida, that lasted nearly ten hours. A millennium celebration was held at Walt Disney World in Florida, primarily at the Epcot theme park.

U.S. President Bill Clinton watched with thousands of spectators in Washington, D.C. as the Washington Monument lit up at midnight. Washington was also the world's largest Y2K command center despite GMT being the coordinated time zone.

In Havre de Grace, Maryland, a spoof of the New York ball drop using an eight-foot long, five-foot high wood-and-plastic foam lit duck instead of a ball was started to celebrate the millennium and has been done again every year since. Another spoof occurred in Point Pleasant, New Jersey with a 10-foot (3.0 m) fish made of wood and mylar called "The Millennium Mossbunker" was dropped for the new millennium.

In the Roxy Theatre in Atlanta, Georgia, the band Gov't Mule played three sets for a concert at the theatre to celebrate the millennium. At the first set, during the last few minutes before 2000, the band played their song "Towering Fool" which was then followed by a brief "Countdown Jam" for the remainder of the old year. Immediately after the millennium started, the band sang a cover of King Crimson's song "21st Century Schizoid Man" (the first time the band sang the song at a concert) to welcome the 21st century. The concert was released as an album titled Mulennium though not until 2010.

At the Sacsayhuamán archaeological site in Cusco, Peru, 1,500 performers reenacted the Incan tradition of the Festival of the Moon.

A ceremony was held in Panama to mark the full transfer of the Panama Canal from the United States on 31 December 1999 at 12:00 am local time in accordance with the Torrijos–Carter Treaties signed in 1977 by US president Jimmy Carter and Panamanian military leader Omar Torrijos.

=== UTC–6 ===
Chicago celebrated the millennium by hosting a fireworks show on Navy Pier, along with celebrations at homes and in Grant Park, as was viewed during the ABC 2000 Today broadcast.

=== UTC–7 ===
Singer Neil Diamond sang "America" during a concert given by him at the Pepsi Center in Denver, Colorado and incorporated the Mountain Time millennium countdown and celebrations into the performance.

=== UTC–8 ===
In Los Angeles, the Hollywood Sign was illuminated in various colors, one of the very few times the sign was lit. At Disneyland, a minute before midnight, Sorcerer Mickey appeared on Sleeping Beauty Castle, shooting a giant stream of fire to the top of the Matterhorn as a 2000 sign illuminated, kicking off a fireworks show. It was also the last stop in the ABC 2000 Today broadcast in the United States.

In San Francisco, the first prototype of the Clock of the Long Now built by the Long Now Foundation was activated just before midnight on 31 December and rang in the new Millennium by the date indicator changed from 01999 to 02000, and the chime struck twice. The clock is designed to last at least 10,000 years and this is the reason for the extra digit in its display (ie. "02000" instead of "2000").

In Seattle, the Space Needle unveiled its Skybeam, a system of powerful searchlights projecting vertically into the night sky, for the first time at midnight. Access to the base of the Needle was blocked off and all other celebrations in the city were canceled for security reasons, after the 1999 Seattle WTO protests on 30 November and the arrest of a man with a large cache of explosives in nearby Port Angeles, Washington on 14 December.

=== UTC–9 ===
Alaska was the next to celebrate the millennium, at Little Diomede Island, Fairbanks and Anchorage, with fireworks and Yupik drumming. Some of the planned celebrations had been canceled in Anchorage, as many people planned to stay home, due to the temperature of −8 °F (−22 °C) and fog.

=== UTC–10 ===
Hawaiian celebrations were centered in Honolulu. The party was headed by then-governor Benjamin Cayetano and his family.

=== UTC–11 ===
Samoa became the last independent nation to celebrate the new millennium by virtue of using the world's latest inhabited time zone (UTC−11:00). This time zone remained in use in Samoa until Thursday, 29 December 2011, when it skipped Friday 30 December then instantly shifted to UTC+13 on Saturday, 31 December 2011.

== See also ==
- Year 2000 problem
- List of UTC time offsets
- 2000 millennium attack plots
