= Paul Heiney =

British radio and television presenter, and author

- Born: Paul Wisniewski; 20 April 1949 (age 76); Sheffield, Yorkshire, England
- Occupation(s): Radio and TV presenter and author
- Spouse: Libby Purves
- Children: 2

Paul Heiney (born Paul Wisniewski, 20 April 1949) is a British radio broadcaster and television reporter. He is perhaps best known as a former presenter of That's Life!.

== Early life ==
He was born in Sheffield, Yorkshire, the son of Norbert Wisniewski and Evelyn Mardlin. He changed his surname to Heiney in 1971. He attended Parson Cross Primary School on Halifax Road, Sheffield, and High Storrs Grammar School for Boys.

== Career ==
=== Radio ===
In 1971–74 he was one of the founder broadcasters on BBC Radio Humberside with his programme of music, chat and current affairs titled Scunsbygookington, the title of which reflected the key towns in the Humberside region: Scunthorpe, Grimsby, Goole, Kingston-upon-Hull and Bridlington. In 1974–76 he was a reporter for Newsbeat on BBC Radio 1, then in 1976–78 a reporter for the Today programme on BBC Radio 4. Between 1983 and 1985 he presented the Radio 4 consumer programme You and Yours and later was an occasional presenter of the weekly farming magazine programme On Your Farm.

=== Television ===
His television debut was on That's Life! in 1978; he stayed on the programme until 1982. He worked on In At The Deep End in which Heiney takes on a range of challenges and new jobs. During the making of one episode (1984) Heiney memorably interviews the Hollywood film actor Oliver Reed for acting tips but Reed becomes increasingly irritated with Heiney's attempts at playing a role and abruptly stops the filming of the programme and physically manhandles Heiney out of his house.

Heiney also presented The Travel Show, Food and Drink and, on BBC Radio 4, You and Yours. He later presented BBC One's consumer affairs programme Watchdog and also presented the ITV primetime show Countrywise from 2009 to 2015.

In September 2011, Heiney co-hosted a prime time Genealogy series Missing Millions alongside Melanie Sykes on ITV.

== Film ==
As part of his tasks for the TV series In at the Deep End, Heiney had a speaking role as a German mercenary commander in the 1985 film Water opposite Michael Caine.

== Personal life ==
In 1990, Heiney took up traditional farming in Westleton, Suffolk where he lives with his wife Libby Purves. The couple have a daughter.

Their first child, Nicholas, died on 26 June 2006, aged 23; Nicholas hanged himself in the family home after suffering from a serious mental illness. A collection of his poems and sea-logs of a Pacific journey under square rig, The Silence at the Song's End, has been published, inspired a song cycle by Joseph Phibbs, and was broadcast on Radio 4.

For ten years Heiney worked 36 acres (15 ha) with Suffolk Punch horses. He wrote a diary of his activities for The Times as well as several books. He also presented two videos about farming with horses, Harnessed to the Plough and First Steps to the Furrow.

Heiney had agreed with his wife that they should have the farm for no more than ten years. After the farm's sale Heiney tried to make more time for his other great passion, sailing.

He has also presented A Victorian Summer for Anglia Television, eight half-hour programmes about traditional farming: the glory of working the land with horses as well as the rigours and difficulties that Victorian farmers faced.

In 2005 he took part, in the family boat, in the single-handed transatlantic OSTAR race, and wrote an account of the race's history and his own slow crossing in The Last Man Across The Atlantic.
