= Laurie Brown (broadcaster) =

Canadian television journalist

- Born: 7 October 1957 (age 69); Toronto, Ontario, Canada
- Occupation: journalist
- Known for: The NewMusic, On the Arts, The Signal

Laurie Brown (born 7 October 1957) is a Canadian television journalist. She grew up in Scarborough, Ontario and graduated from David and Mary Thomson Collegiate Institute. Her parents were originally from Nova Scotia, and when Brown was in her late teens, they and her sister Susan moved back to that province. Brown remained in Toronto, and eventually embarked on a career in television and radio broadcasting.

Brown currently lives in Nova Scotia.

== Broadcasting ==
She was a host on the Citytv program The NewMusic from 1985 to 1990. She interviewed numerous musicians for this show, including jazz performer Miles Davis in 1988. As well, Brown worked as a VJ on the Much Music channel. She also hosted Pepsi Power Hour for the music station.

In 1984 Brown had a cameo in Corey Hart's video for "Sunglasses at Night".

After leaving Much Music, Brown was a reporter for the CBC Television news show The Journal, and then host of On the Arts for CBC Newsworld. She was also one of the Canadian hosts of 2000 Today, an ambitious international New Year's Eve broadcast.

Brown has also hosted Toronto Biographies for Rogers Television and Front Row Fridays for Treasure HD.

From March 2007 until September 2017, Brown hosted The Signal on CBC Radio 2. Originally she hosted the show from Monday to Friday, after budget cuts forced changes at CBC, Brown took over the weekend editions of the show as well. After the debut of The Strombo Show on Sunday evenings, The Signal aired 6 times a week, Monday to Saturday at 10 PM until 12 midnight (ON EST), with Brown continuing as the sole host of the show.

She also introduced each show's featured weekly host, a different classical artist who chooses favorites for This Is My Music Saturday mornings on CBC Radio 2 10 AM ET.

== Podcasting ==
In January 2018 she launched a new podcast called "Pondercast", featuring original compositions by musician Joshua Van Tassel.

== Writing ==
Brown has published one book, Success Without College: Days and Nights in Rock & Roll TV, and in 2017 was working on a novel, tentatively titled The Night Will Always Win.

== Bibliography ==
- Brown, Laurie, Success Without College: Days and Nights in Rock & Roll TV ISBN 0-14-016536-3 (1994, Penguin)
- Brown, Laurie (6 January 1995). "Taking the mass out of mass medium". The Globe and Mail. pp. A19.
