= TV Luna =

Defunct Slovakian television channel

TV Luna was a private Slovak television network that broadcast from 27 November 1999. It broadcast via terrestrial and satellite Intelsat 707 (1° E). The channel promised a balanced news service, as STV and Markíza's news operations were seen as partial to one party at the time, however there were allegations that the channel was close to the then-ruling SDL party. Its initial budget included a loan from the Devín Bank. Moreover, there was an initial plan to include five-minute news updates every hour, and a 20-minute talk-show in the style of Larry King Live.

The general director of the television was Peter Sedlák. The owner of the television was the company WN Danubius Film, which in 2000 was renamed TV LUNA, spol. with r. o. TV Luna was the successor of the bankrupt DCTV. In October 2001, the channel was set to be saved by filmmaker Rudolf Biermann using money from Argus Capital. The Broadcasting and Retransmission Council revoked its license on 20 November 2001. TV Luna's assets were declared bankrupt on 28 April 2003. The TV Luna company was officially dissolved on 5 January 2009.
