= Jüri Aarma =

Estonian actor, musician, and cultural journalist (1951–2019)

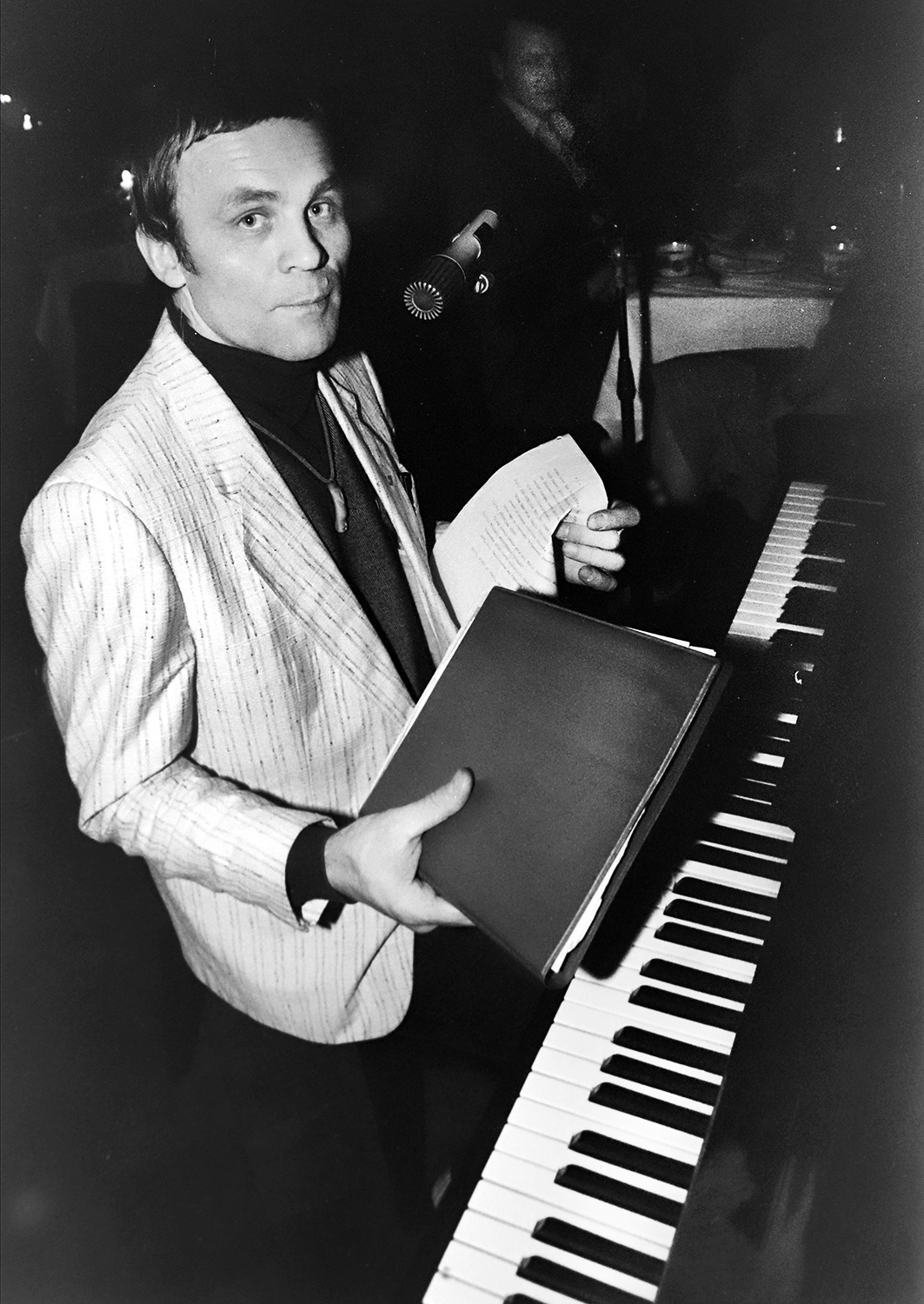
- Jüri Aarma (1992)

Jüri Aarma (30 May 1951 Kirov Oblast – 21 May 2019 Tallinn) was an Estonian actor, musician and cultural journalist.

From 1970 to 1977, he studied at the Department of the Performing Arts of the Tallinn State Conservatory (now, the Estonian Academy of Music and Theatre) and completed the 6th Flight, under the guidance of Grigori Kromanov and Mikk Mikiver.

He was then an actor in the Youth Theater until 1995. From 1992 to 1996, he was a regular editor, then co-author of Kuku Raadio. From 1995 to 2002 he was a member of Teater. Muusika. Kino.

Aarma has worked for Maaleht since 2005 and has held a number of roles in editing cultural news, writing colorful interviews, participating in several television programs with which Maaleht was a partner. He also hosted the cultural program Praegu ja siin on Tallinna TV.

Aarma was married to choral conductor Merike Aarma and his children are Kiur Aarma and Roosi-Mae Aarma.

On 21 May 2019, Aarma was struck and killed by a train on the Tallinn-Veerenni level crossing while on his bicycle.
