= Telecentro (Dominican Republic) =

Dominican television channel

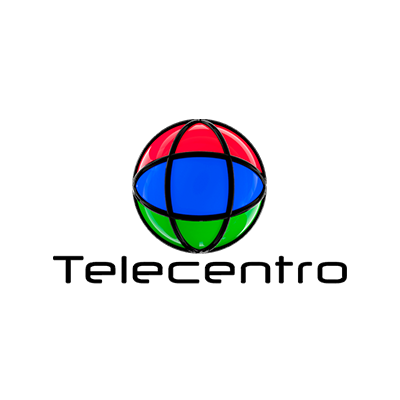
- Type: Free-to-air
- Country: Dominican Republic
- Headquarters: Santo Domingo

Programming
- Language: Spanish
- Picture format: 1080i HDTV; (downscaled to 480i for the SD feed)

Ownership
- Owner: Grupo de Medios Telemicro

History
- Launched: August 20, 1972; 53 years ago
- Former names: Tele Inde (1972-1985); TV13 (1985-1995)

Links
- Website: telecentro.com.do

Availability

Terrestrial
- Analog VHF: Channel 13
- Digital VHF/UHF: Channel 13.1

Telecentro is a Dominican over-the-air television channel, owned by Grupo de Medios Telemicro. It began broadcasting in 1972 under the name Tele-Inde on channel 30 UHF in Santo Domingo, later moving to channel 13 VHF in the capital adopting the name TV13, and in 1995 it changed its name to the current Telecentro.

== History ==
In 1972, José Semorille, then director of the National Electronics Institute (INDE), had the idea of launching a television station with old equipment rebuilt by this institution. This is how Tele-Inde was born on August 20, 1972. This station began transmitting on UHF channel 30, being the first channel to transmit on that band in the country, and then began transmitting on VHF channel 13. It broadcast for 4 hours, from 6pm to 10pm. Early in its existence, Teleinde broadcast a schedule consisting primarily of educational content, as well as programming provided from European embassies.

In the early 1980s, the station moved to channel 13, being acquired by Jacinto Peynado, Guaroa Liranzo and José Hazim. The new management renamed the channel TV13 as a consequence. In 1983, the channel aired a campaign from former president Joaquín Balaguer. The then-president Salvador Jorge Blanco ordered the closure of the channel for three months. In 1986, the channel received new equipment and started employing the Betacam recording standard as well as receiving Ikegami cameras.

In 1999 the channel was acquired by the Grupo Baninter, which made numerous changes ranging from the graphic line to the presentation of major programs, such as Divertir con Jochy, the midday stage of De Remate (hosted by the late comedian Luisito Martí), El Gordo de la Semana, Con Freddy y Milagros, Los Electrolocos, Ciudad Nueva, La Aldea Mágica, among others. The line of cartoons (Pokémon, Teletubbies) and telenovelas were also strengthened. Beginning in 2002, Telecentro started airing newscasts from the newly-launched RNN (channel 27), which shared facilities.

On April 7, 2003, as the country was facing a financial crisis, Baninter was intervened by the Dominican State, when a million-dollar fraud and deficit was detected. Due to this, the State also intervened in companies owned by Baninter, including Telecentro. The administration of the channel passed into the hands of the Central Bank of the Dominican Republic and had different administrators over the years.

Since 2015, it was rumored in different media outlets in the country that the Telemicro Media Group was in negotiations for the acquisition of Telecentro. Finally, on May 17, 2016, it was reported that the president of this group, Juan Ramón Gómez Díaz, had completed the purchase of the channel along with the station Radio Cadena Espacial (1280 AM and 107.3 FM) Santo Domingo and Zona Sur and 1560AM and 107.9 Cibao.
