= Geri Maye =

Irish presenter on radio and television

- Born: County Limerick, Ireland
- Occupation: Presenter
- Employer: Raidió Teilifís Éireann (RTÉ)
- Known for: The Den

Geri Maye is an Irish presenter on radio and television who worked predominantly on Raidió Teilifís Éireann (RTÉ).

She was born in County Limerick. She used to work for RTÉ on The Den (children's television). Then she left RTÉ and went to Sydney before returning to present a show on RTÉ lyric fm. She was once engaged to Ray D'Arcy. She was also engaged to judge Brian Purcell from The Apprentice. She married Peter Collins, a business man from Limerick, in 2012.

On 21 December 2011, RTÉ announced her as the new co-presenter of Winning Streak. She replaced Kathryn Thomas and presented alongside Marty Whelan. She had done the Dream Maker Wheel segment and deputised for Kathryn Thomas in the past. She left Winning Streak in 2013 and was replaced by Sinead Kennedy.
