= Kiur Aarma =

Estonian television journalist (born 1975)

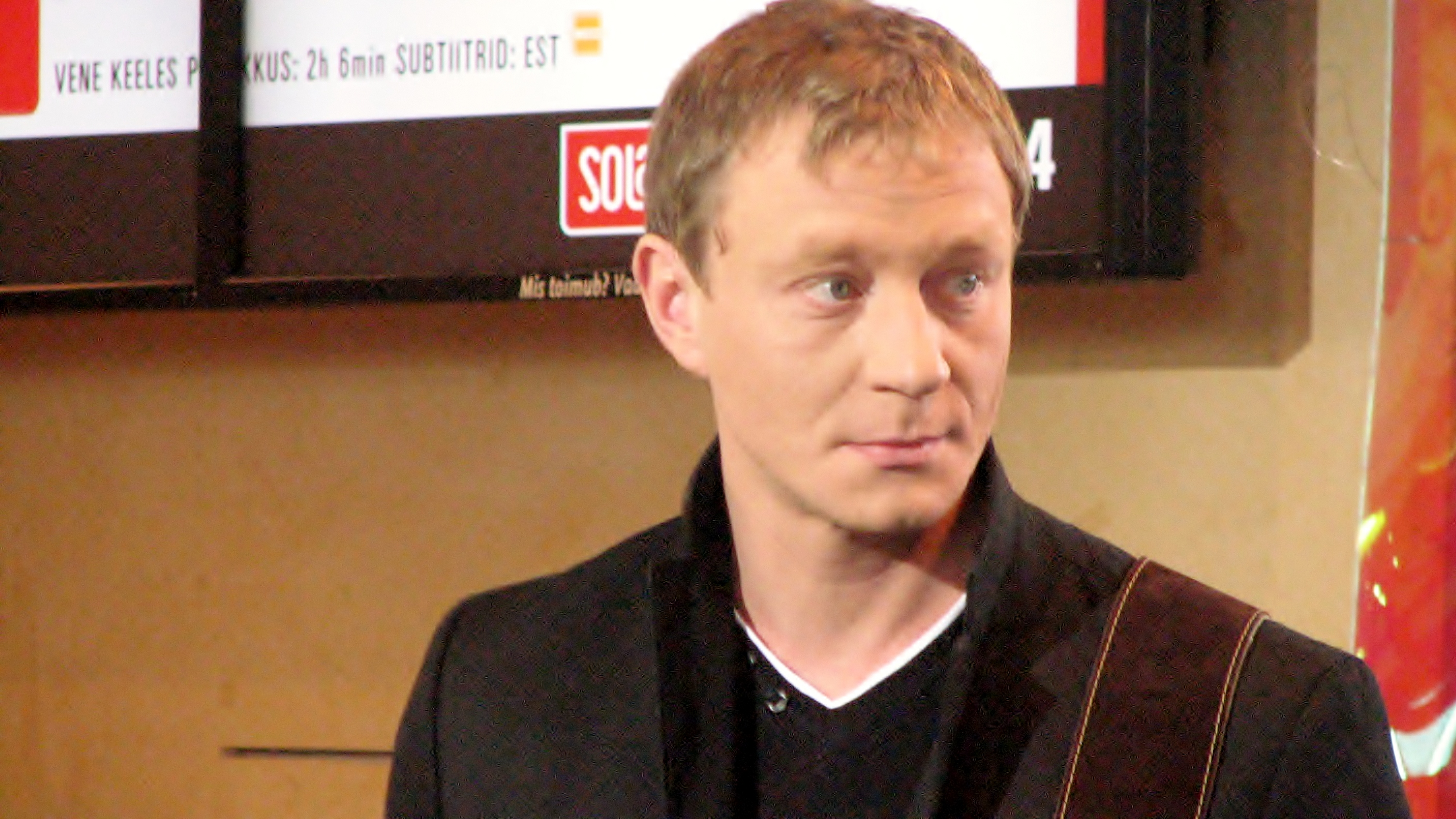
Kiur Aarma in 2012

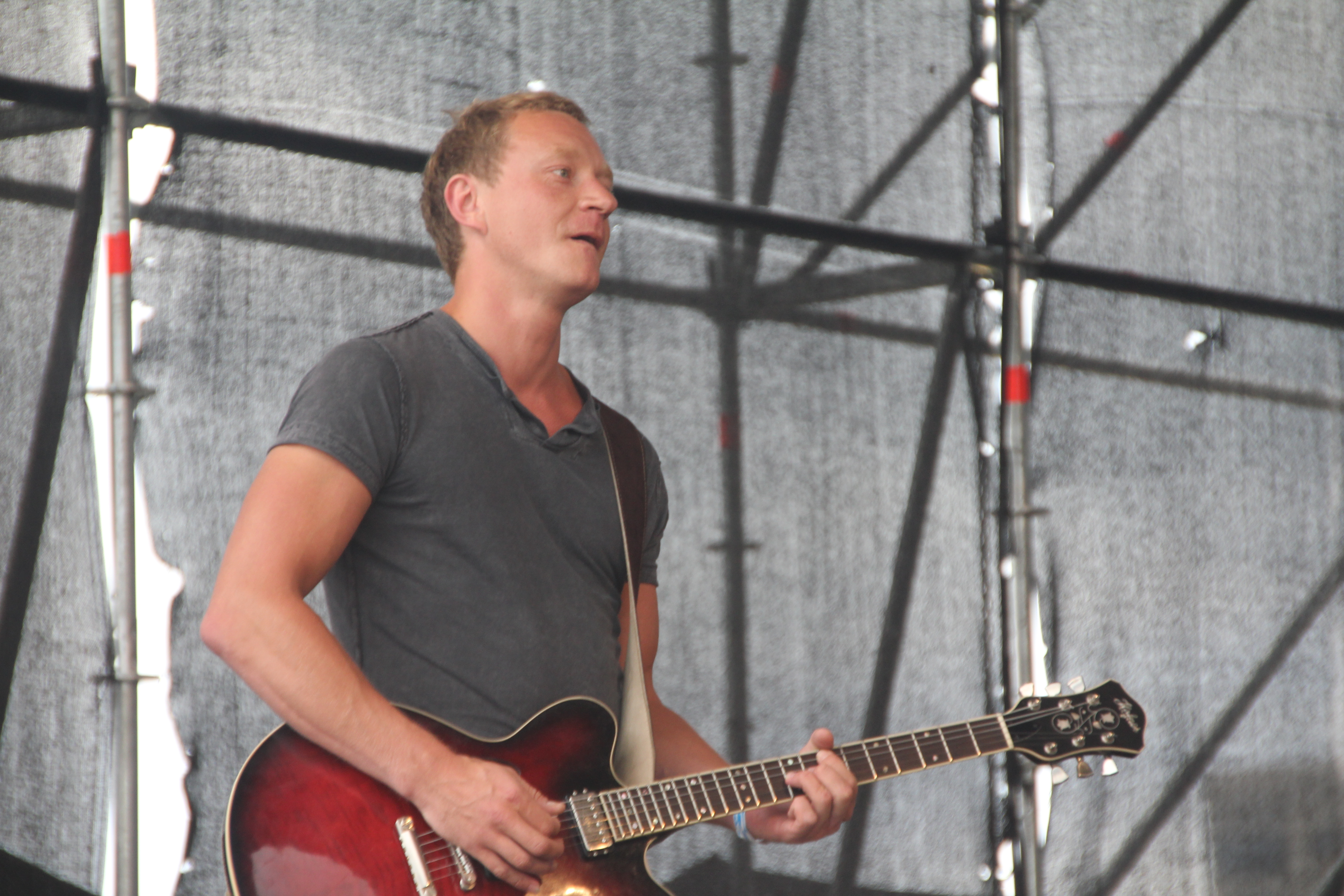
Kiur Aarma in 2011

Kiur Aarma (born June 25, 1975) is an Estonian television journalist. He graduated from the University of Tartu in 1997. Aarma is also a writer and producer; among the films upon which he has worked is 2006's Sinimäed, a documentary about the Battle of Tannenberg Line, which he produced and helped write.

His father was actor, musician and journalist Jüri Aarma and his mother is choral conductor Merike Aarma.

== Bibliography ==
- Jaanus Kulli. Kiur Aarma: Kui olulise loo rääkimiseks on vaja keegi ära tappa, ju siis tuleb seda teha., SL Õhtuleht, 5. November 2005 (in Estonian)
- Heidit Kaio. Eesti suurima teletootja lahutus, Eesti Ekspress, 9. mai 2008 (in Estonian)
