= 1900s in Western fashion =

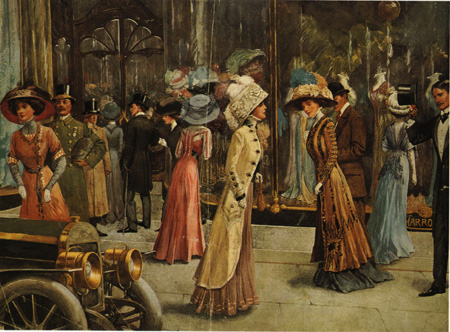
Fashionable Londoners in front of Harrods, 1909. The trailing skirts which were very tight showing skin and broad-brimmed hats of mid-decade narrower dresses and hats with deep crowns. Men wear top hats with formal morning dress or bowlers with lounge suits.

Fashion in the period 1900–1909 in the Western world continued the severe, long and elegant lines of the late 1890s. Tall, stiff collars characterized the period, as did women's broad hats and full "Gibson Girl" hairstyles. A new, columnar silhouette introduced by the couturiers of Paris late in the decade signaled the approaching abandonment of the corset as an indispensable garment.

== Women's fashion ==
=== General overview ===
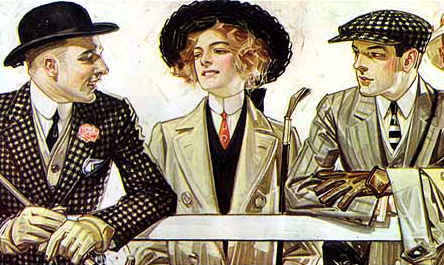
Young women adopted the tall, stiff collars and narrow neckties worn by men (advertisement for Arrow shirt collars)

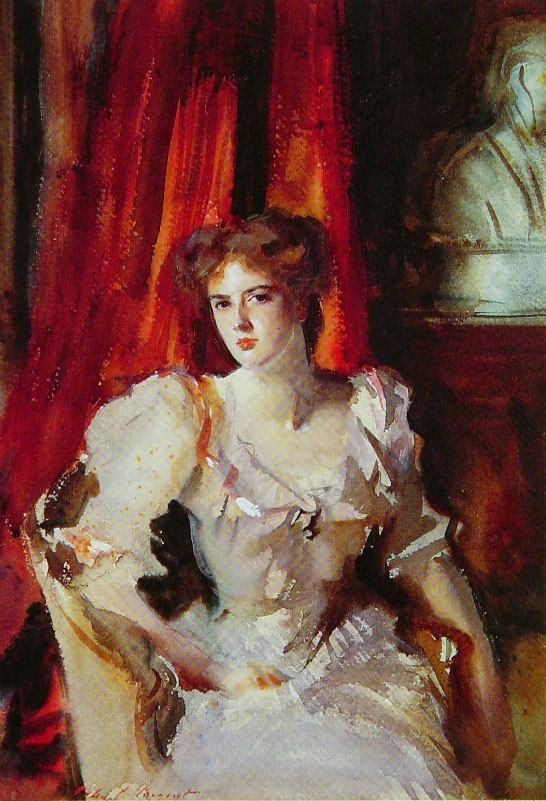
John Singer Sargent's portrait of Miss Eden shows a fashionable full breast, low neckline, and mass of hair, 1905.

With the decline of the bustle, sleeves began to increase in size and the 1830s silhouette of an hourglass shape became popular again. The fashionable silhouette in the early 20th century was that of a confident woman, with full low chest and curvy hips. The "health corset" of this period removed pressure from the abdomen and created an S-curve silhouette.

Since 1897, the silhouette has slimmed and elongated by a considerable amount. Blouses and dresses were full in front and puffed into a "pigeon breast" shape of the early 20th century that looked over the narrow waist, which sloped from back to front and was often accented with a sash or belt. Necklines were supported by very high boned collars.

Skirts brushed the floor, often with a train, even for day dresses, in mid-decade. The fashion houses of Paris began to show a new silhouette, with a thicker waist, flatter bust, and narrower hips. By the end of the decade the most fashionable skirts cleared the floor and approached the ankle. The overall silhouette narrowed and straightened, beginning a trend that would continue into the years leading up to the Great War.

In early 1910, a survey of wealthy high school senior students at a private New York City girls' school found that each spent an average of $556 ($19,212 as of 2017) annually for clothing excluding undergarments, and would have spent four times that amount with an unlimited budget.

=== Sportswear and tailored fashions ===
Women moving out of the Victorian era and into the Edwardian era were starting to dress for a more active lifestyle. The evolving times brought a new fashion trend known as the "New Woman". Active lives required less constricting clothing and more simple and streamlined garments. The new woman was highly encouraged by women's suffrage. Those that identified with this fashion movement were the type of women that were starting to venture out of maintaining the domestic circle and beginning to pursue higher education, office jobs, and participating in active outdoor sports. The new and improved fashions allowed for women to swing a tennis racket or golf club, but the ideas of "proper" feminine attire reduced the progress of more practical sportswear.

Tailored suits became more popular for the women that were beginning to work in white-collar jobs. Tailored suits with no frills allowed for women maintaining an office job to seem more masculine and blend into the male-dominated environment. Shortly, the number of American women attending colleges increased, and the shirtwaist became popular among the average college girl. The outfit worn by the typical college girl was a skirt that was usually shorter than current fashion, and a shirtwaist, which is best described as the equivalent of jeans and a T-shirt today.

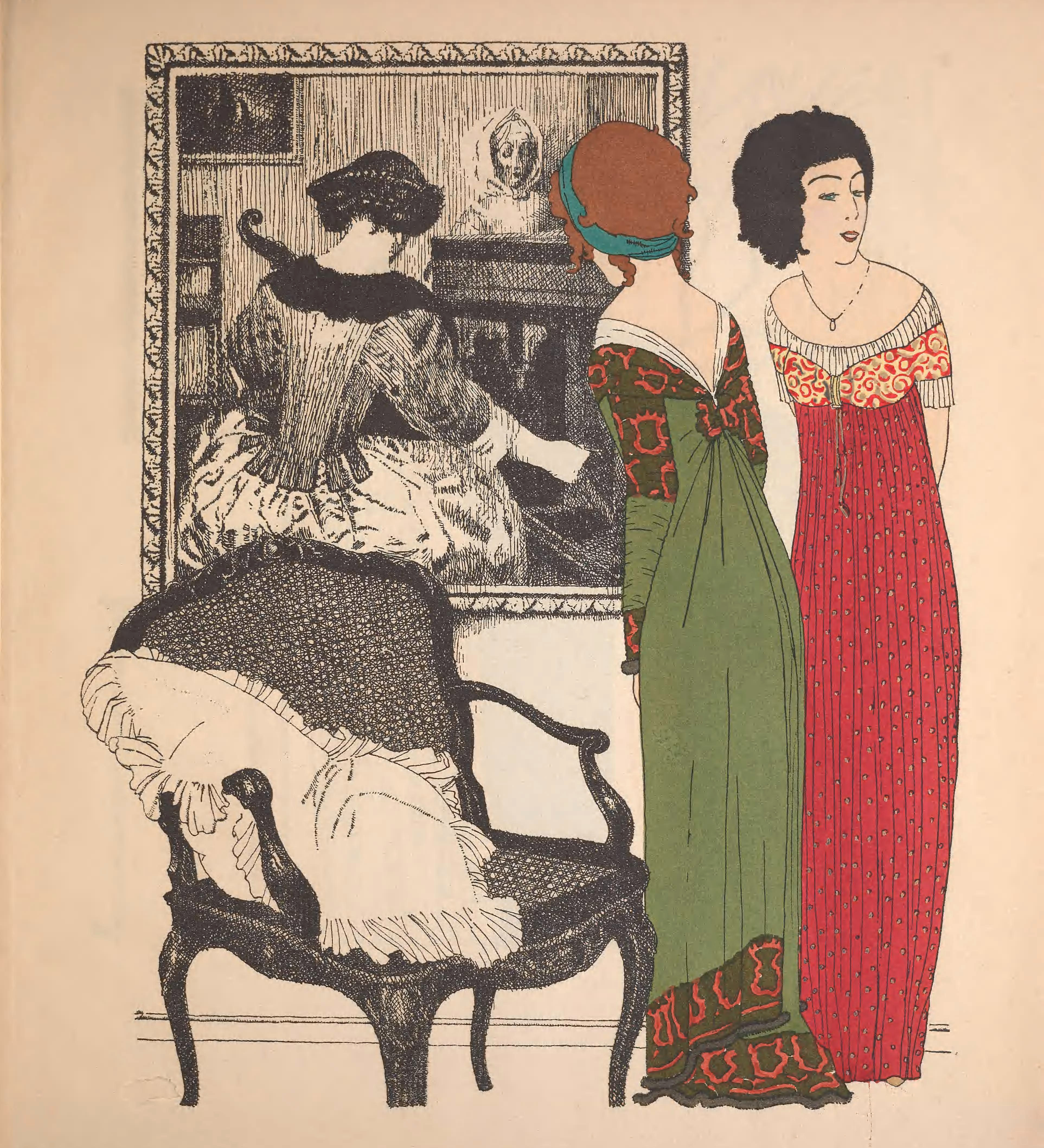
Paul Poiret's new silhouette of 1908 was a radical departure.

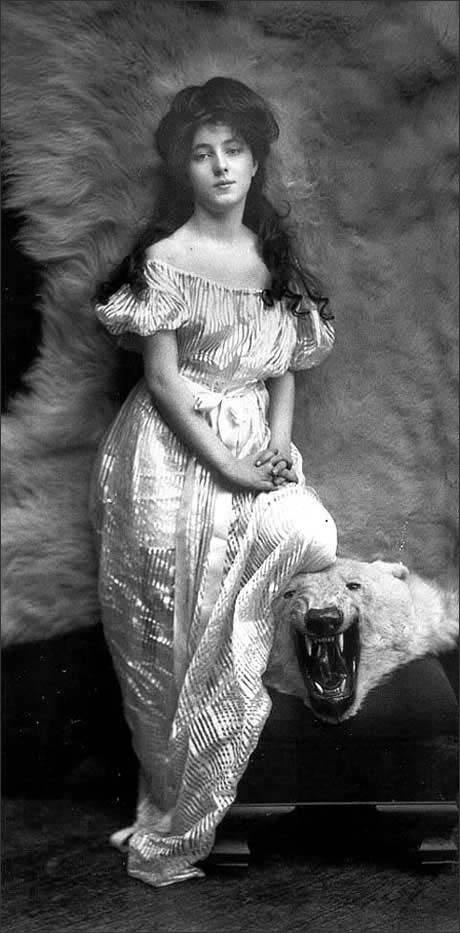
Evelyn Nesbit, in this photograph taken in 1901, has some of her wavy hair swept up to the top of her head, with the rest of her hair flowing past her shoulders in curling tendrils.

Unfussy, tailored clothes were worn for outdoor activities and traveling. The shirtwaist, a costume with a bodice or waist tailored like a man's shirt with a high collar, was adopted for informal daywear and became the uniform of working women. Wool or tweed suit (clothing) called tailor-mades or (in French) tailleurs featured ankle-length skirts with matching jackets; ladies of fashion wore them with fox furs and huge hats. Two new styles of headgear which became popular at the turn of the century were the motoring veil for driving and sailor hats worn for tennis matches, bicycling and croquet.

=== Rise of haute couture ===
This decade marked the full flowering of Parisian haute couture as the arbiter of styles and silhouettes for women of all classes. Designers sent fashion models or mannequins to the Longchamp races wearing the latest styles, and fashion photographs identified the creators of individual gowns. In 1908, a new silhouette emerged from Callot Soeurs, Vionnet at the house of Doucet, and most importantly, Paul Poiret. The styles were variously called Merveilleuse, Directoire, and Empire after the fashions of the turn of the nineteenth century, which they resembled in their narrow skirts and raised waistlines.

The new styles featured form-fitting gowns with high or undefined waists, or ankle-length skirts and long tunic-like jackets, and required a different "straight line" corset. The Paris correspondent for Vogue described this new look as "straighter and straighter ... less bust, less hips, and more waist...how slim, how graceful, how elegant...!"

=== Hats ===
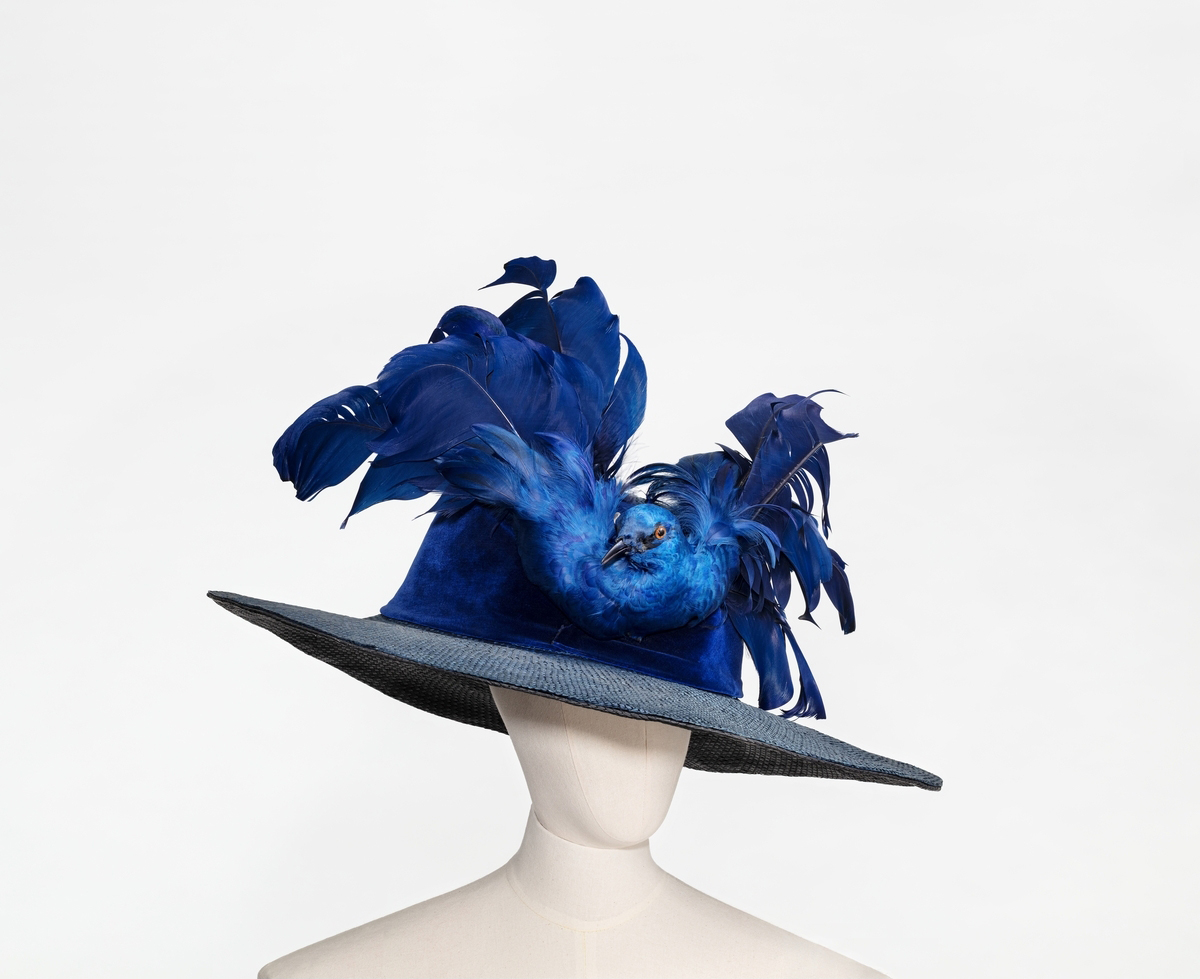
Broad-brimmed hat with stuffed blue bird, ca 1908.

Huge, broad-brimmed hats were worn in mid-decade, trimmed with masses of feathers and occasionally complete stuffed birds (hummingbirds for those who could afford them), or decorated with ribbons and artificial flowers. Masses of wavy hair were fashionable, swept up to the top of the head (if necessary, over horsehair pads called "rats") and gathered into a knot. Large hats were worn with evening wear.

By the end of the decade, hats had smaller drooping brims that shaded the face and deep crowns, and the overall top-heavy effect remained.

=== Footwear ===
Shoes were narrow and often emphasized. They had a pointed toe and a medium height heel. Buttons, patent leather, and laced models of the shoe were also manufactured and readily available. Similarly, there were shoes for every occasion: Oxfords for a tailored costume, slippers with straps for festive occasions or pumps with pearl buckles, and finally, boots which were often edged in fur to stave off the winter chill when riding in carriages. At the beginning of the 1900s, shoes still maintained the same design of the Victorian era. They were commonly made with seal skin or Moroccan leather. Ownership of seal skin boots was most common among people in higher social classes. Seal skin boots were known to be extremely durable and could be worn during every season. Boots made from Moroccan leather were more uncomfortable and stiff. World War I caused this opulent era to tone down due to the increased sanctions on the trade of leather and other fabrics, and shoes were starting to incorporate a fabric topping.

=== Style gallery 1900–1906 ===
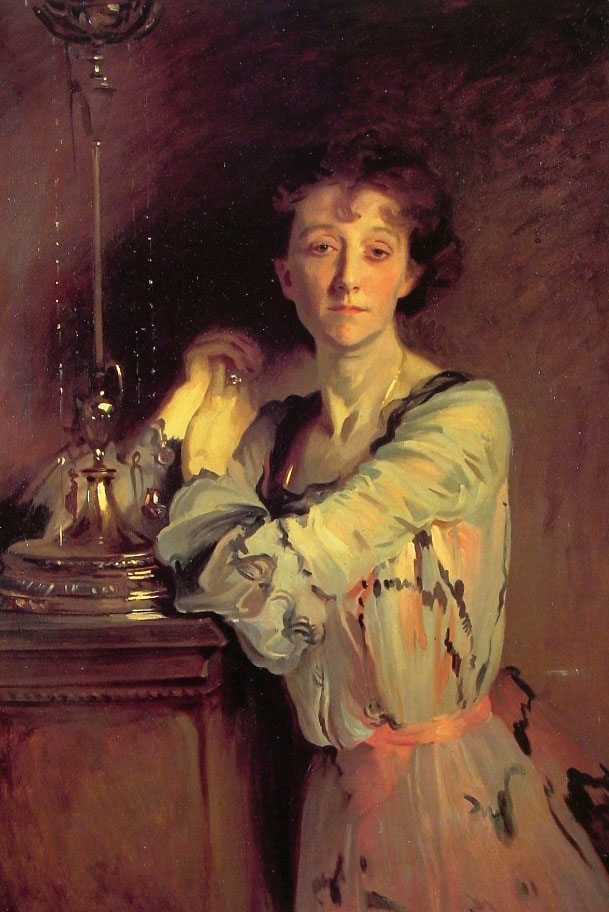
1 – 1900

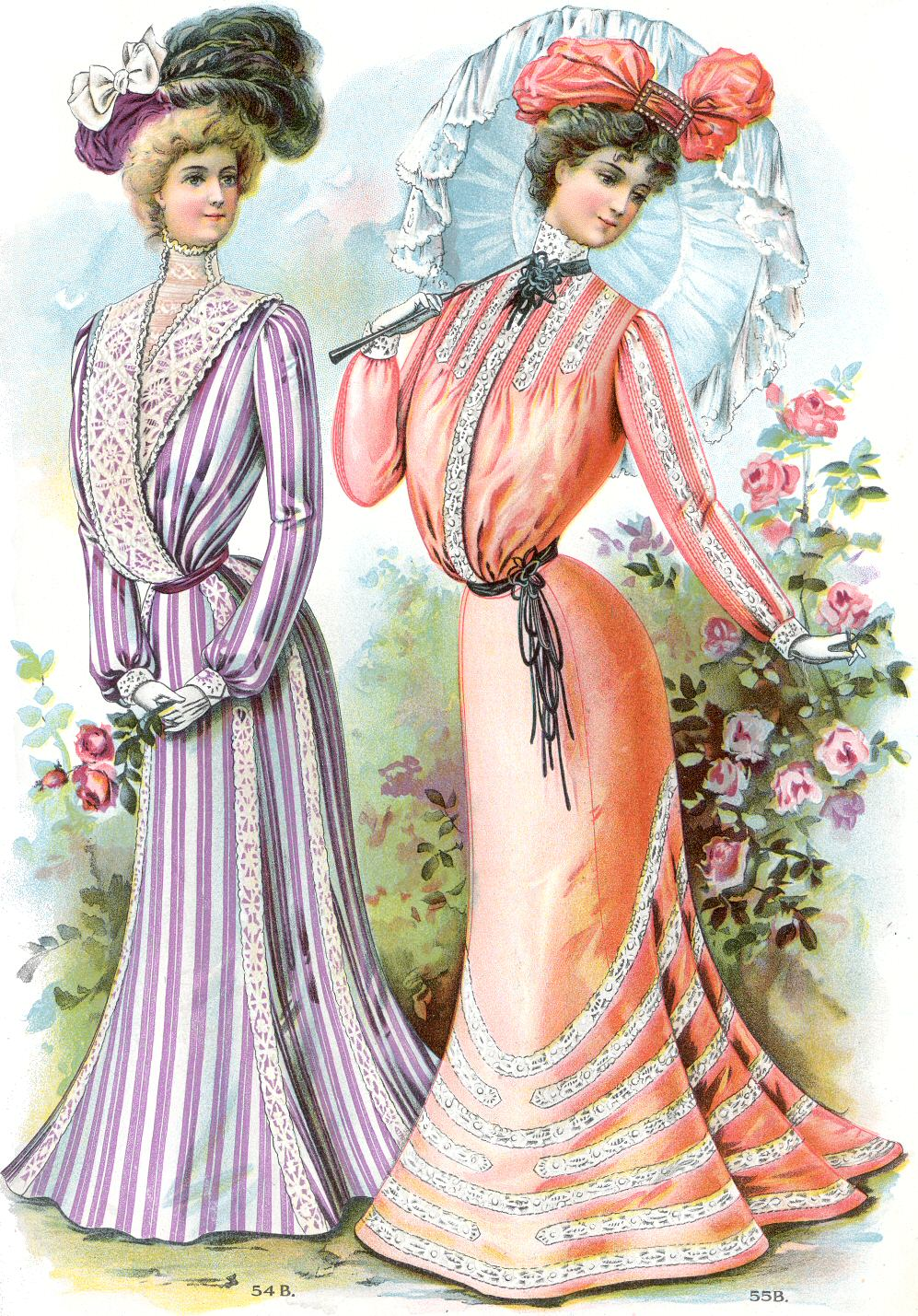
2 – 1901

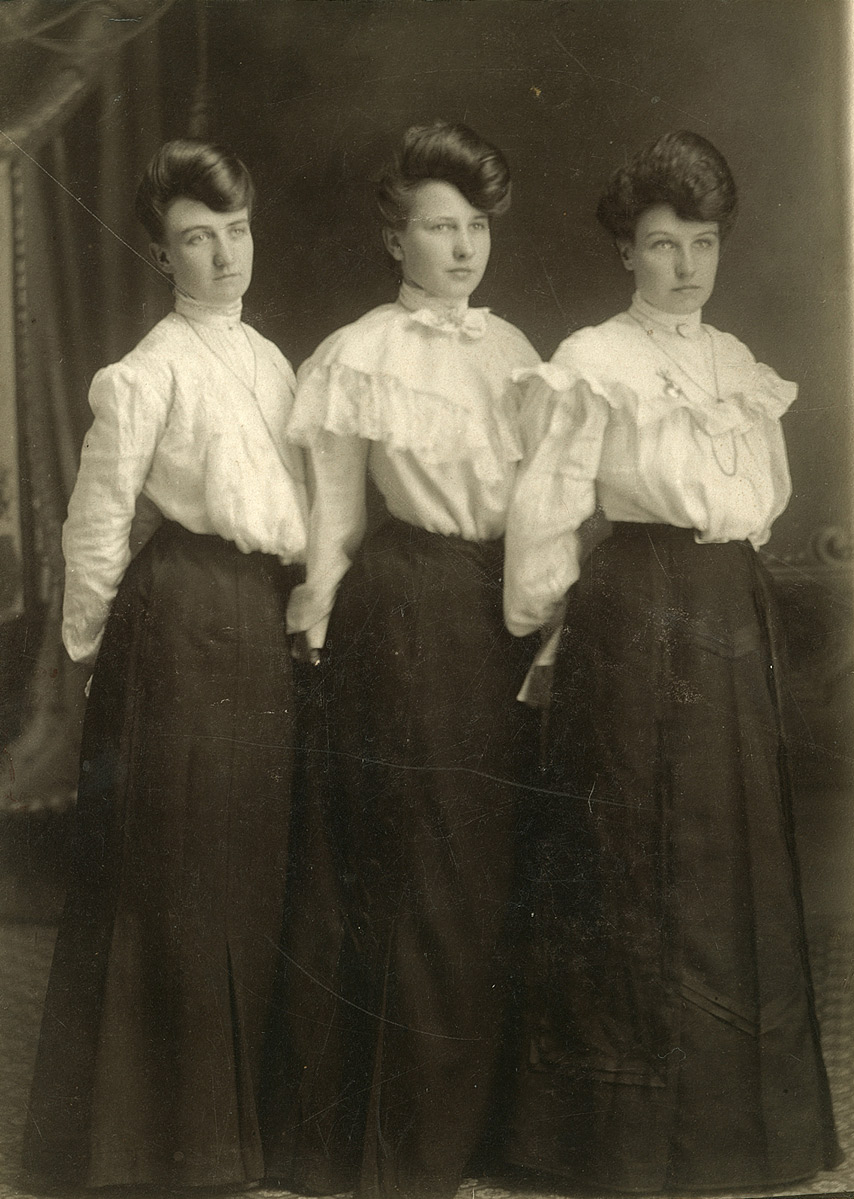
3 – 1902

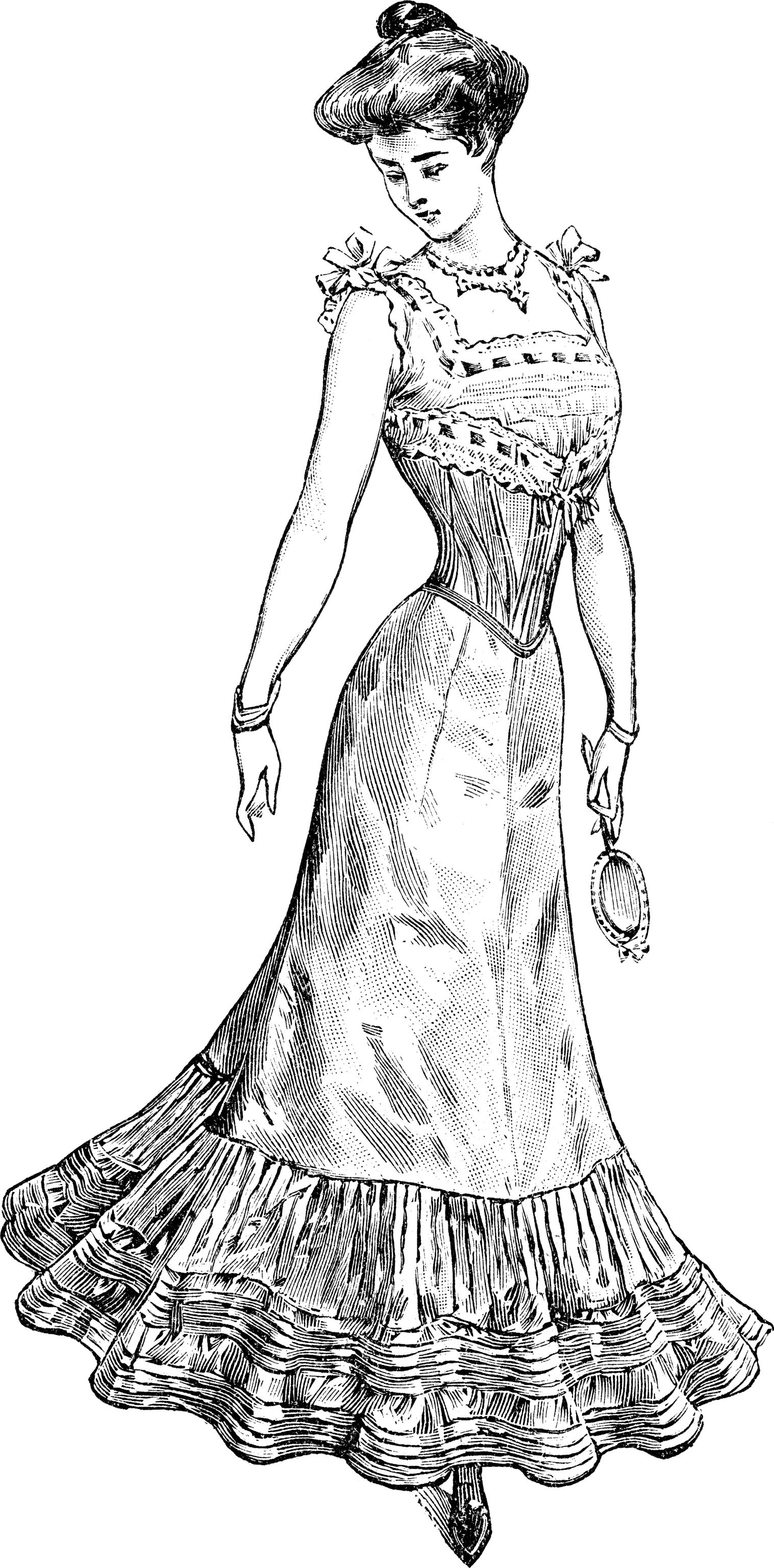
4 – 1903–04

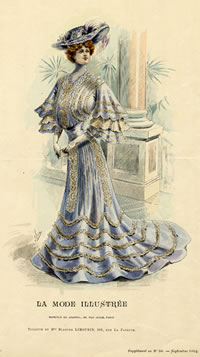
5 – 1904

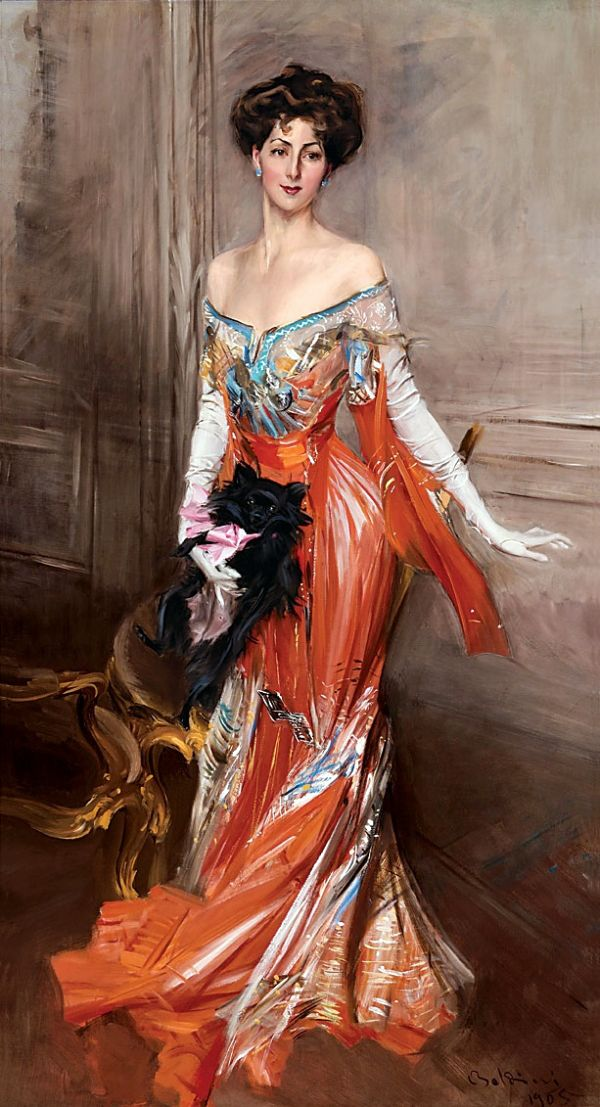
6 – 1905

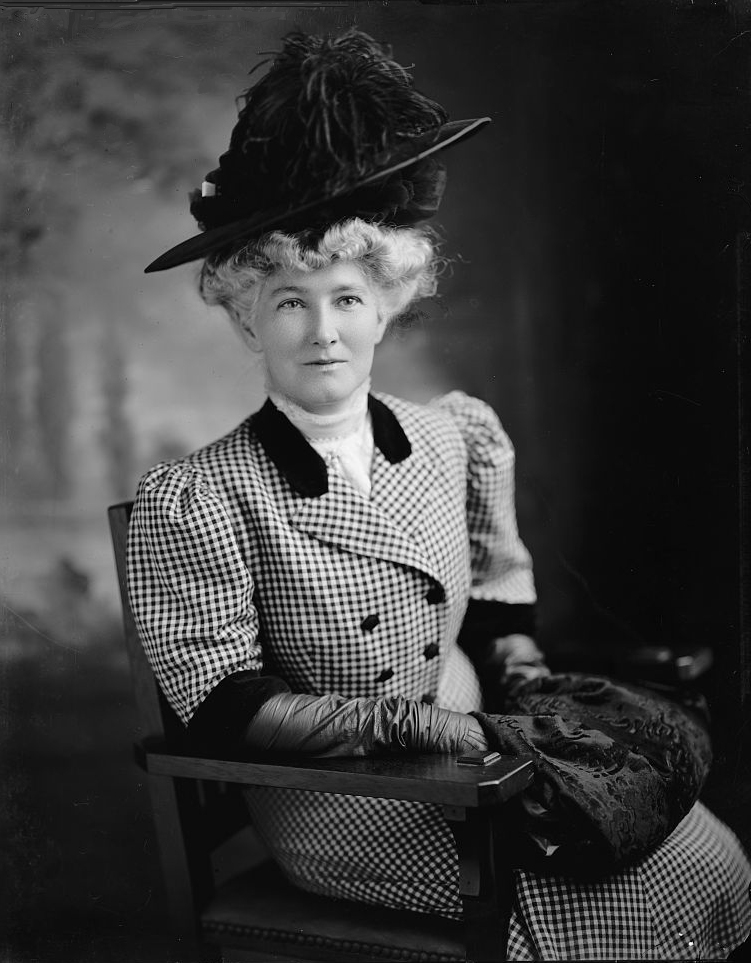
7 - c. 1905

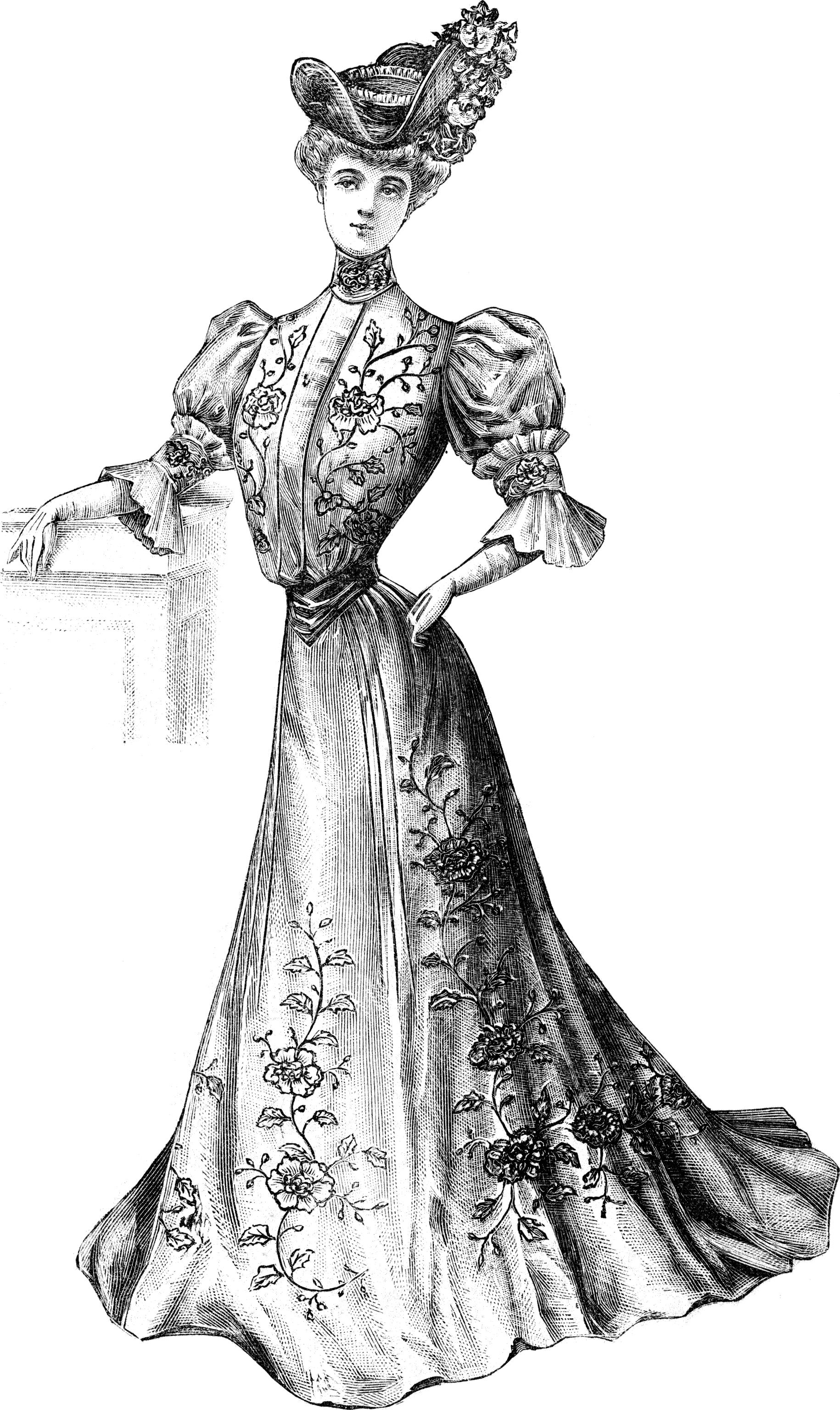
8 – 1906

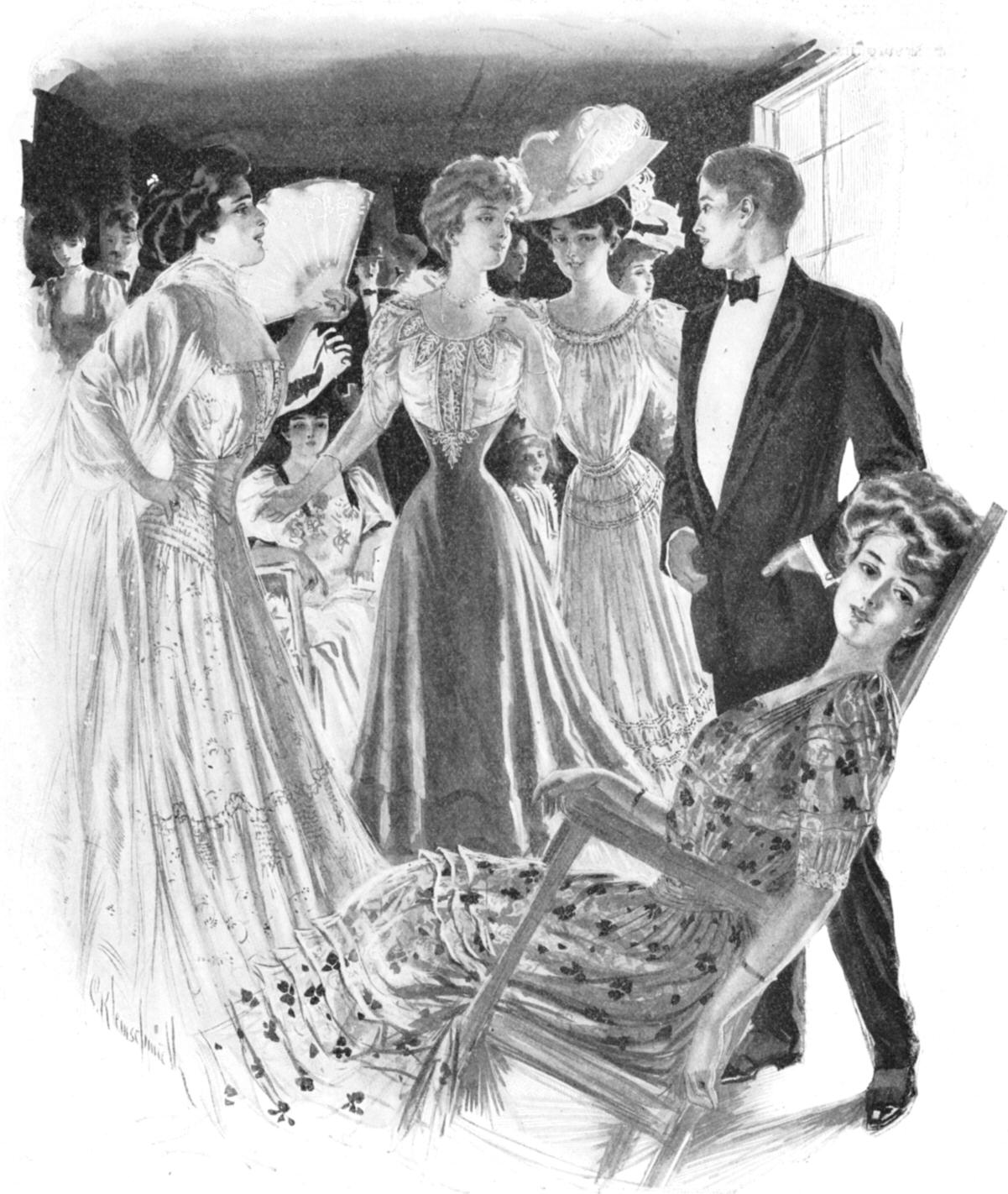
9 – 1906

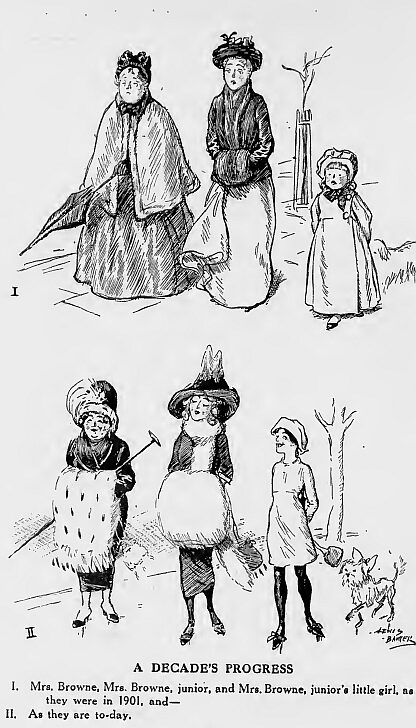
Cartoon in Punch (1911) compares changes in fashion between 1901 and 1911. "The dowdy voluminous clothes of the earlier date, making the grandmother an old lady and the mother seem plain, had been replaced by much simpler looser wear producing a sense of release for all three females."

1. Mrs. Charles Russell wears a sheer patterned dress with fullness at the front waist over a soft sash. This dress might have been called a tea gown at this time (1900).
2. Fashion illustration for Summer 1901 shows sloped waistline, "pouter pigeon" front bodices, high necklines and large hats with ribbons.
3. Photograph of three sisters c. 1902 illustrates the "pouter pigeon" blouse or shirtwaist and trumpet-skirt that was a mainstay of middle-class clothing.
4. Underwear (camisole (or, more likely, top half of combinations), corset, and trumpet-shaped petticoat) of 1903–04.
5. Fashion plate shows the frothy trained afternoon dress descended from the tea gown, worn with an oversized hat and gloves, 1904.
6. Elizabeth Wharton Drexel wears an off-the-shoulder orange gown with long gloves, 1905.
7. Mrs. John Philip Sousa wears a checked suit with elbow-length sleeves and long gloves, and carries a muff purse, c. 1905.
8. French dress of 1906 is trimmed with embroidery or passementerie. The wide-brimmed hat is cocked up on one side. Elbow-length sleeves are worn with gloves.
9. Summer evening fashions of 1906 have short or three-quarter-length sleeves. Some ladies wear hats, and the gentlemen wear dinner jackets.

=== Style gallery 1907–1909 ===
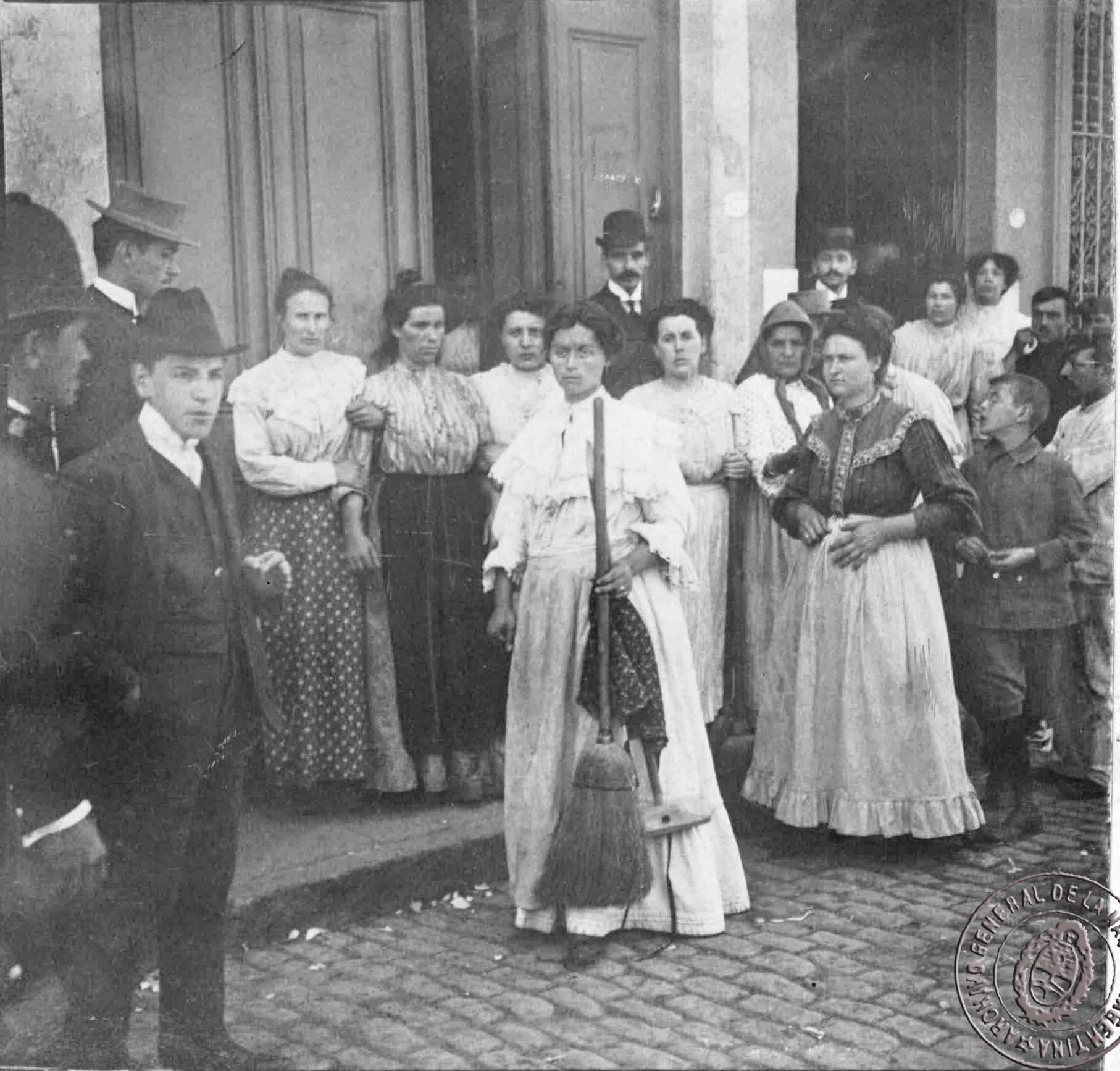
1 – 1907

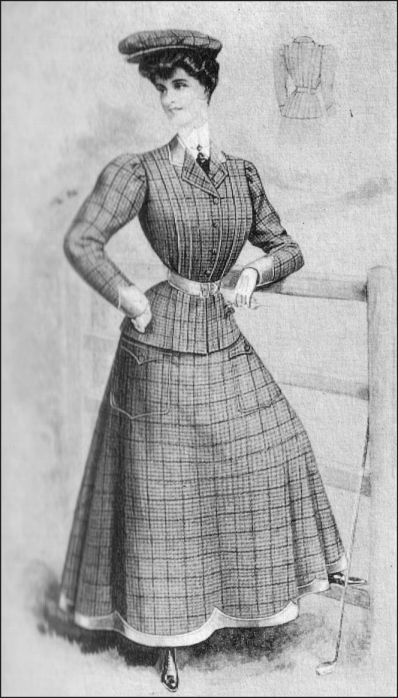
2 – 1907

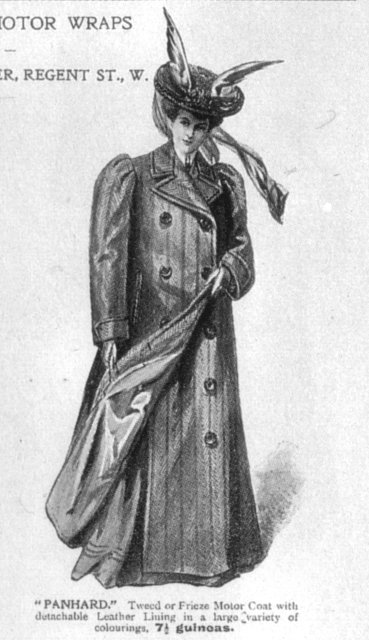
3 – 1907

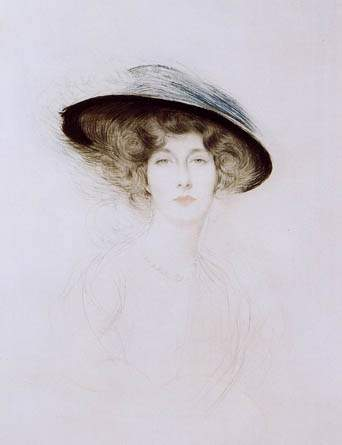
4 – 1908

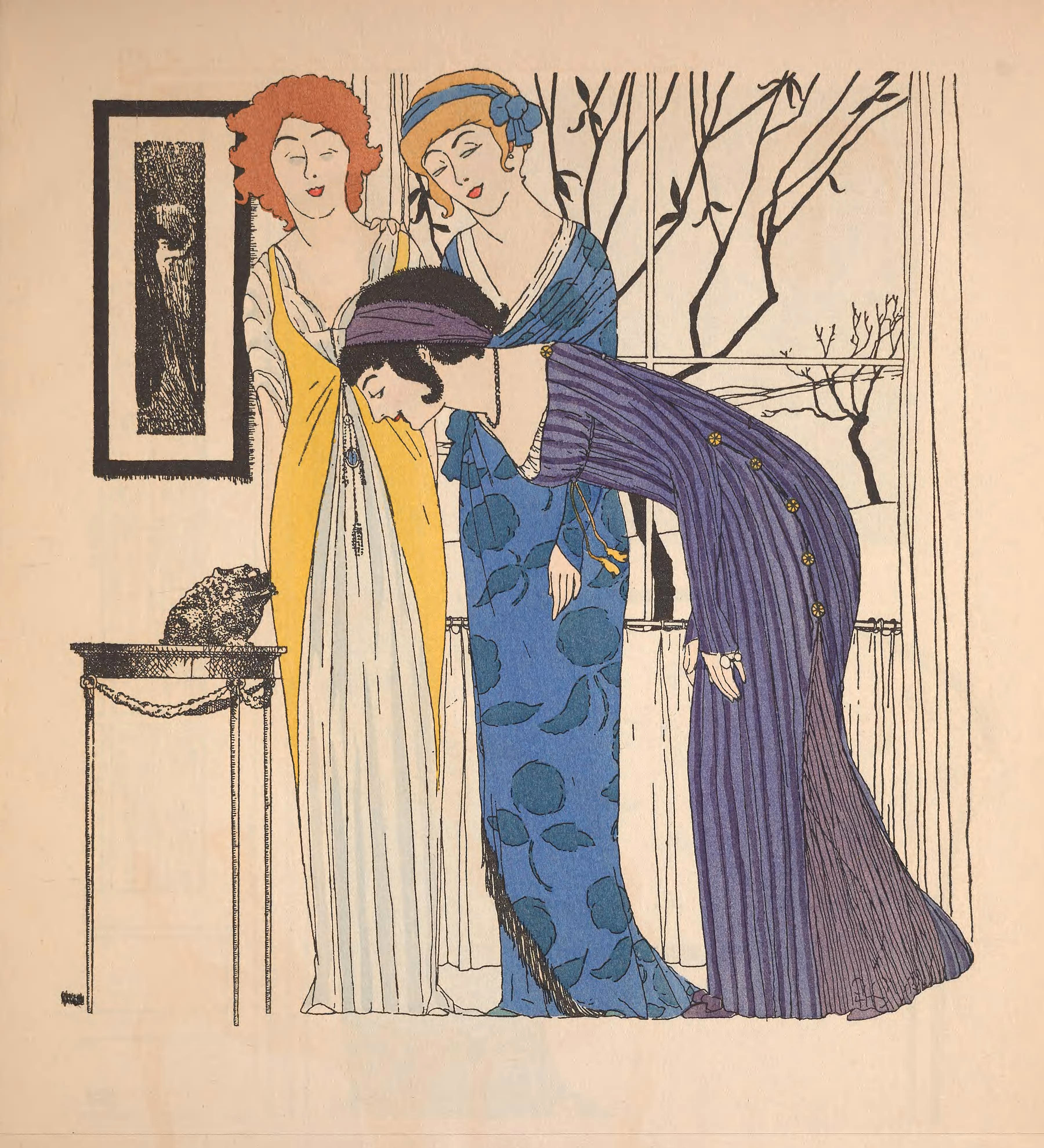
5 – 1908

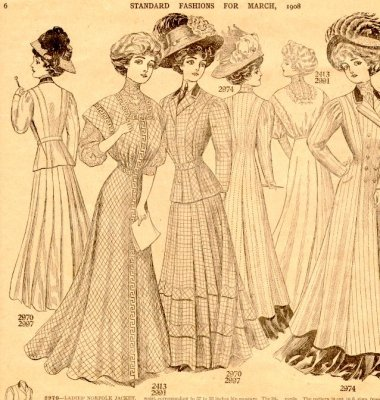
6 – 1908

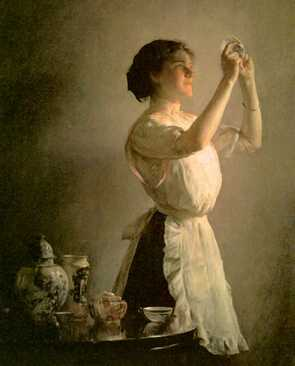
7 – 1909

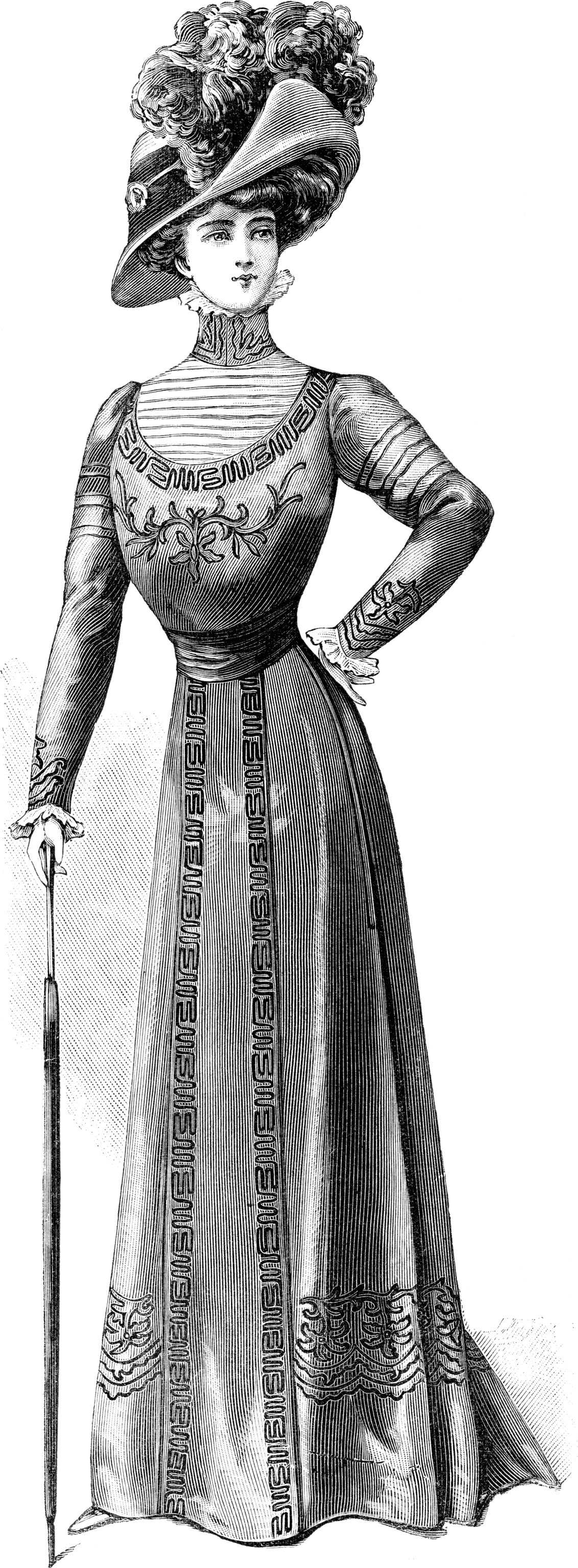
8 – 1909

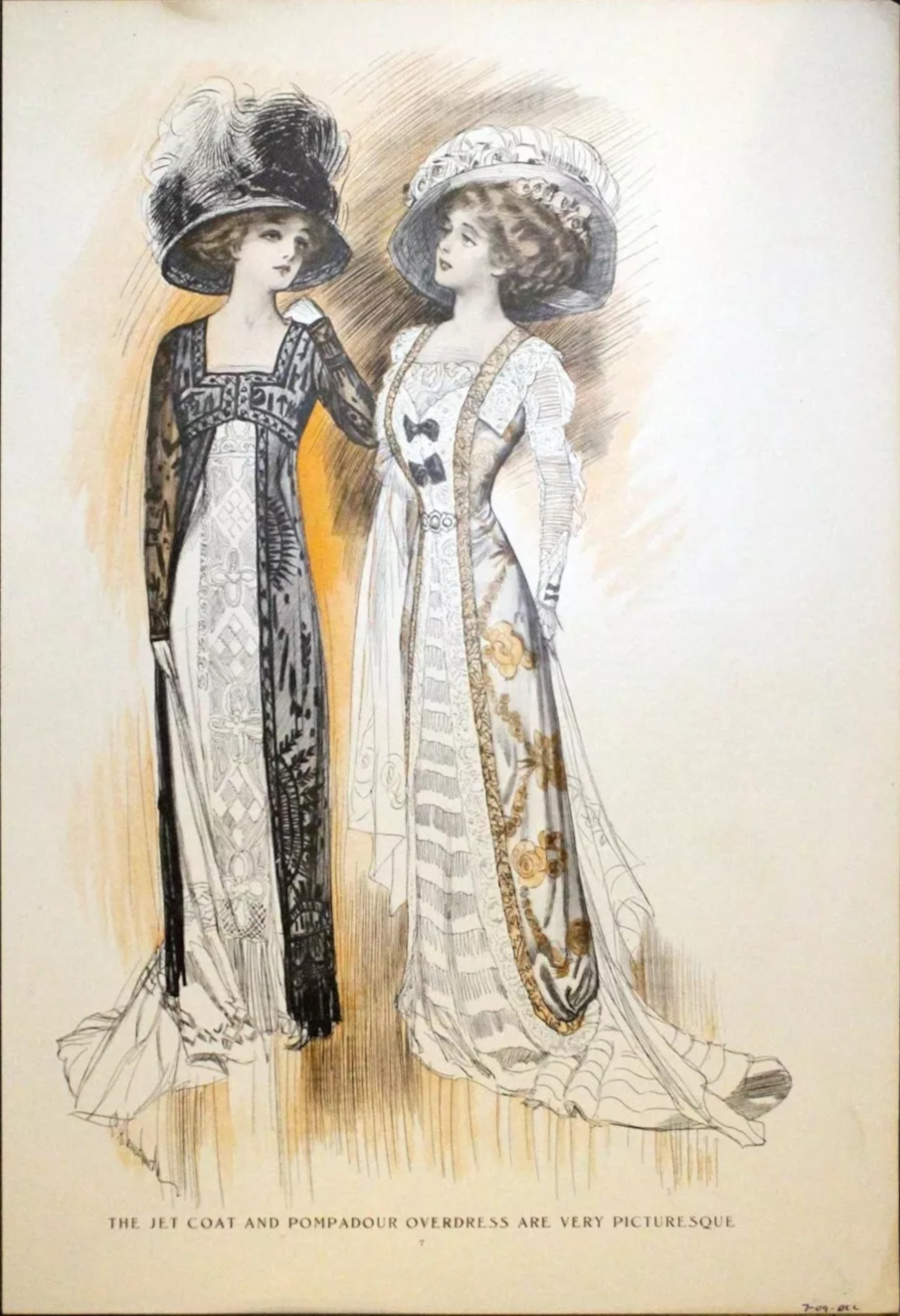
9 – 1909

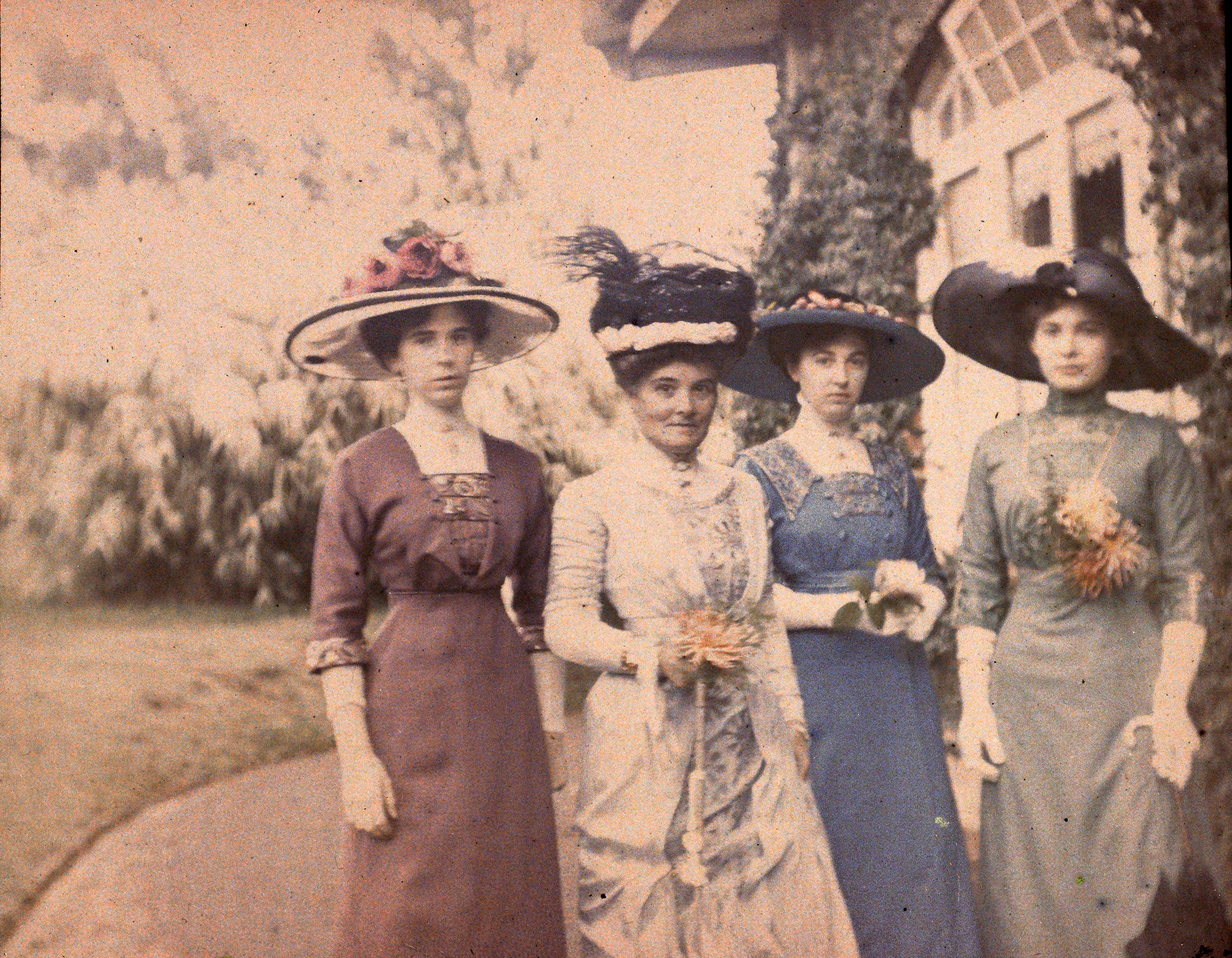
10 – ca 1909
1. Working-class women during the Tenant's Strike of 1907 in Buenos Aires.
2. Golfing costume of 1907 features a tailored jacket and matching ankle-length skirt with patch pockets.
3. Motoring required voluminous coats or dusters to keep clothes clean and wearers warm in open automobiles. They were worn with fashionable hats wrapped in veils, gloves, and often goggles, 1907.
4. 1908 portrait by Paul Helleu captures the fashionable combination of masses of wavy hair beneath a broad-brimmed hat.
5. Dresses by Paul Poiret point the way to a new silhouette, with a high waist and narrow, ankle-length skirts, 1908.
6. Newspaper insert of fashions for 1908 shows dresses of a more conservative cut than the latest Paris modes, but waists are higher and the figure slimmer and more erect than in the first half of the decade.
7. Bib-front apron with pouter-pigeon cut, 1909.
8. High-fashion costume of 1909 has a narrower silhouette. The bodice fits closer to the body, although the waist still slopes, and the hat has a deep crown.
9. Dresses of 1909 show the new fitted, higher-waisted silhouette and are worn with huge hats.
10. Gullick family ca 1909.

== Men's fashion ==
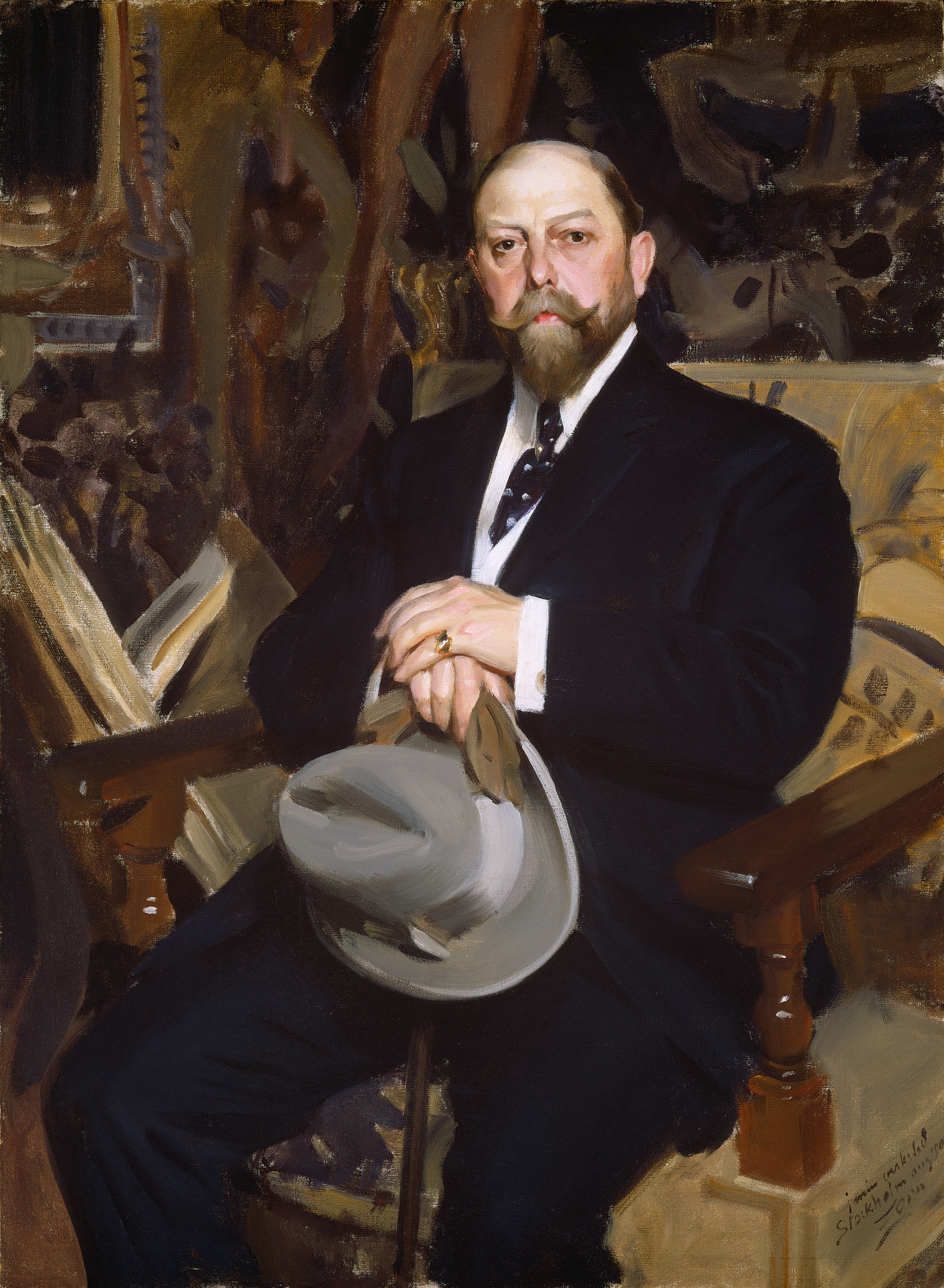
Hugo Reisinger wears a dark suit with a white waistcoat and dotted necktie. He carries the fashionable Homburg hat, 1907, painting by Anders Zorn, 1907

The long, lean, and athletic silhouette of the 1890s persisted. Hair was generally worn short. Beards were less pointed than before and moustaches were often curled.

=== Coats, waistcoats and trousers ===
The sack coat or lounge coat continued to replace the frock coat for most informal and semi-formal occasions. Three-piece suits consisting of a sack coat with matching waistcoat (U.S. vest) and trousers were worn, as were matching coat and waistcoat with contrasting trousers, or matching coat and trousers with contrasting waistcoat. Trousers were shorter than before, often had turn-ups or cuffs, and were creased front and back using the new trouser press.

Waistcoats fastened high on the chest. The usual style was single-breasted.

The blazer, a navy blue or brightly colored or striped flannel coat cut like a sack coat with patch pockets and brass buttons, was worn for sports, sailing, and other casual activities.

The Norfolk jacket remained fashionable for shooting and rugged outdoor pursuits. It was made of sturdy tweed or similar fabric and featured paired box pleats over the chest and back, with a fabric belt. Worn with matching breeches or (U.S. knickerbockers), it became the Norfolk suit, suitable for bicycling or golf with knee-length stockings and low shoes, or for hunting with sturdy boots or shoes with leather gaiters.

The cutaway morning coat was still worn for formal day occasions in Europe and major cities elsewhere, with striped trousers.

The most formal evening clothes remained a dark tail coat and trousers with a dark or light waistcoat. Evening wear was worn with a white bow tie and a shirt with a winged collar. The less formal dinner jacket or tuxedo, which featured a shawl collar with silk or satin facings, now generally had a single button. Dinner jackets were appropriate formal wear when "dressing for dinner" at home or at a men's club. The dinner jacket was worn with a white shirt and a dark tie.

Knee-length topcoats and calf-length overcoats were worn in winter.

=== Shirts and neckties ===
Formal dress shirt collars were turned over or pressed into "wings". Collars were overall very tall and stiffened. Dress shirts had stiff fronts, sometimes decorated with shirt studs and buttoned up the back. Striped shirts were popular for informal occasions.

The usual necktie was a narrow four-in-hand. Ascot ties were worn with formal day dress and white bow ties with evening dress.

=== Accessories ===
Top hats remained a requirement for upper class formal wear; soft felt Homburgs or stiff bowler hats were worn with lounge or sack suits, and flat straw boaters were worn for casual occasions.

Shoes for men were mostly over the ankle. Toe cap, lace up boots in black, gray, or brown were the most common for everyday wear. Formal occasions called for formal boots with white uppers (spat style) and buttons on the side. In the Edwardian times basic lace up oxford shoes were introduced.

=== Style gallery 1900−1906 ===
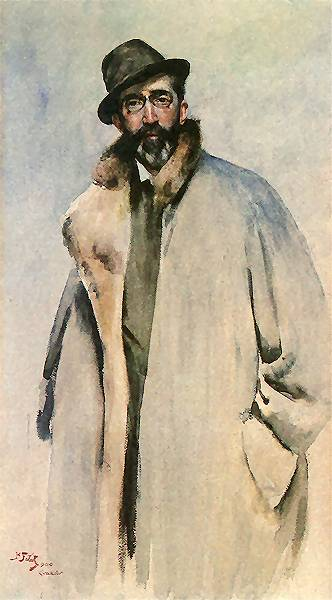
1 – 1900

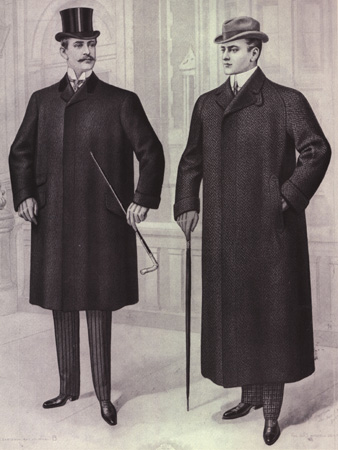
2 – 1900

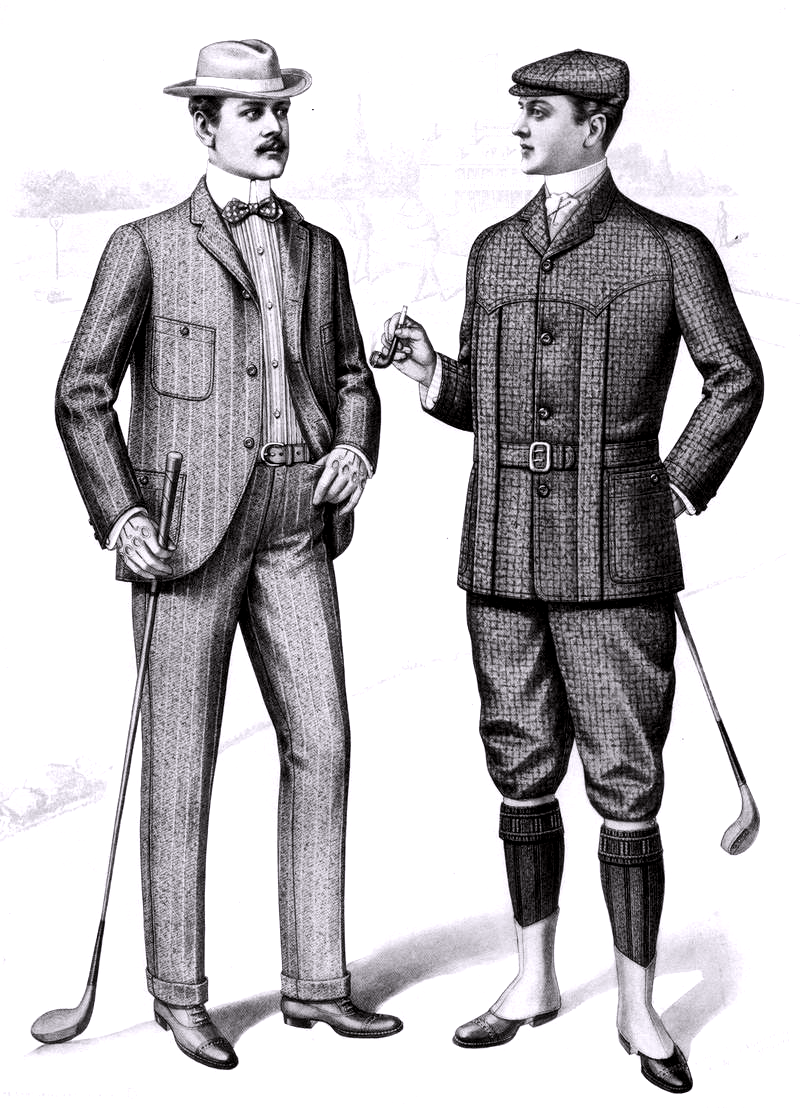
3 - 1901

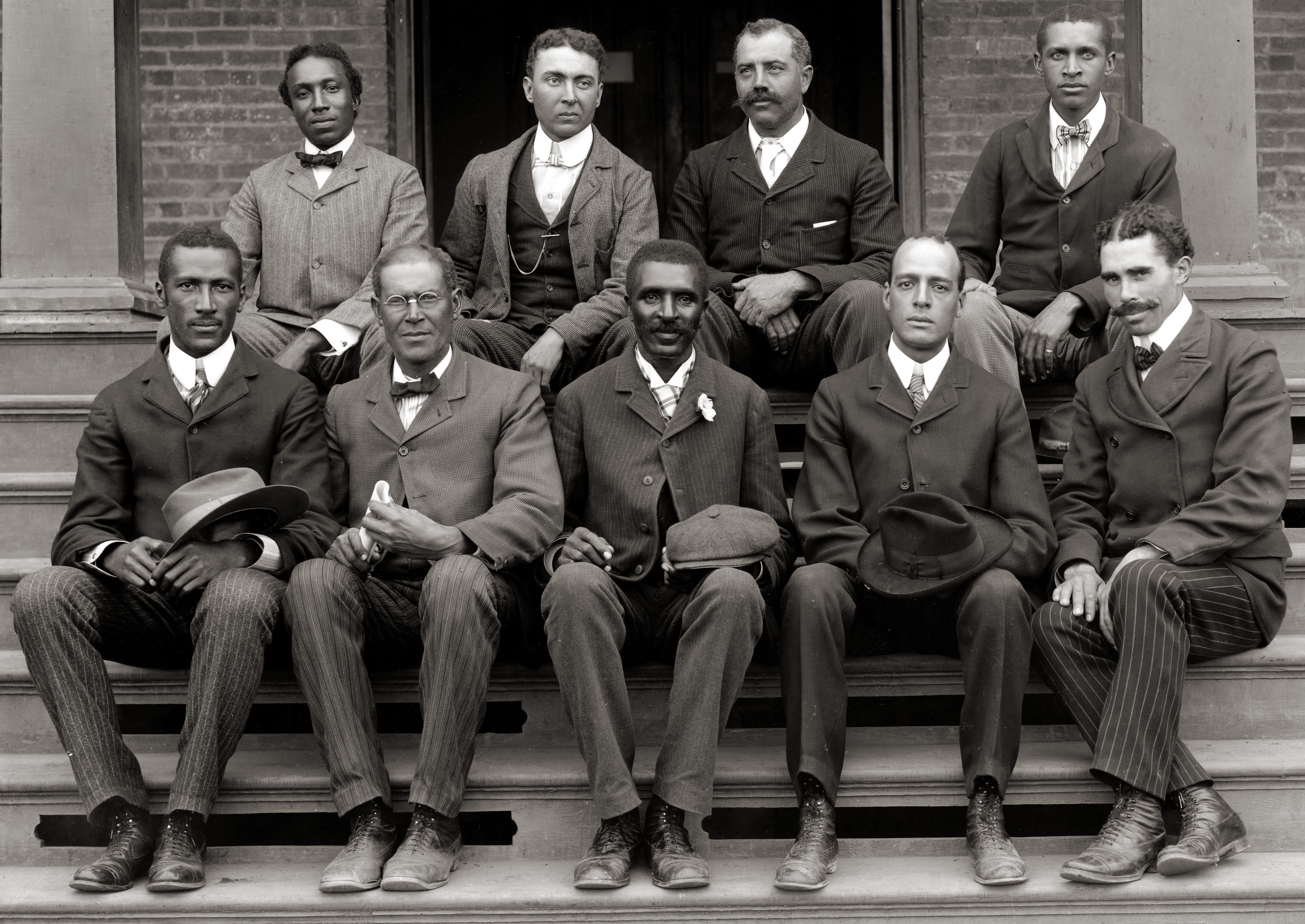
4 - c. 1902

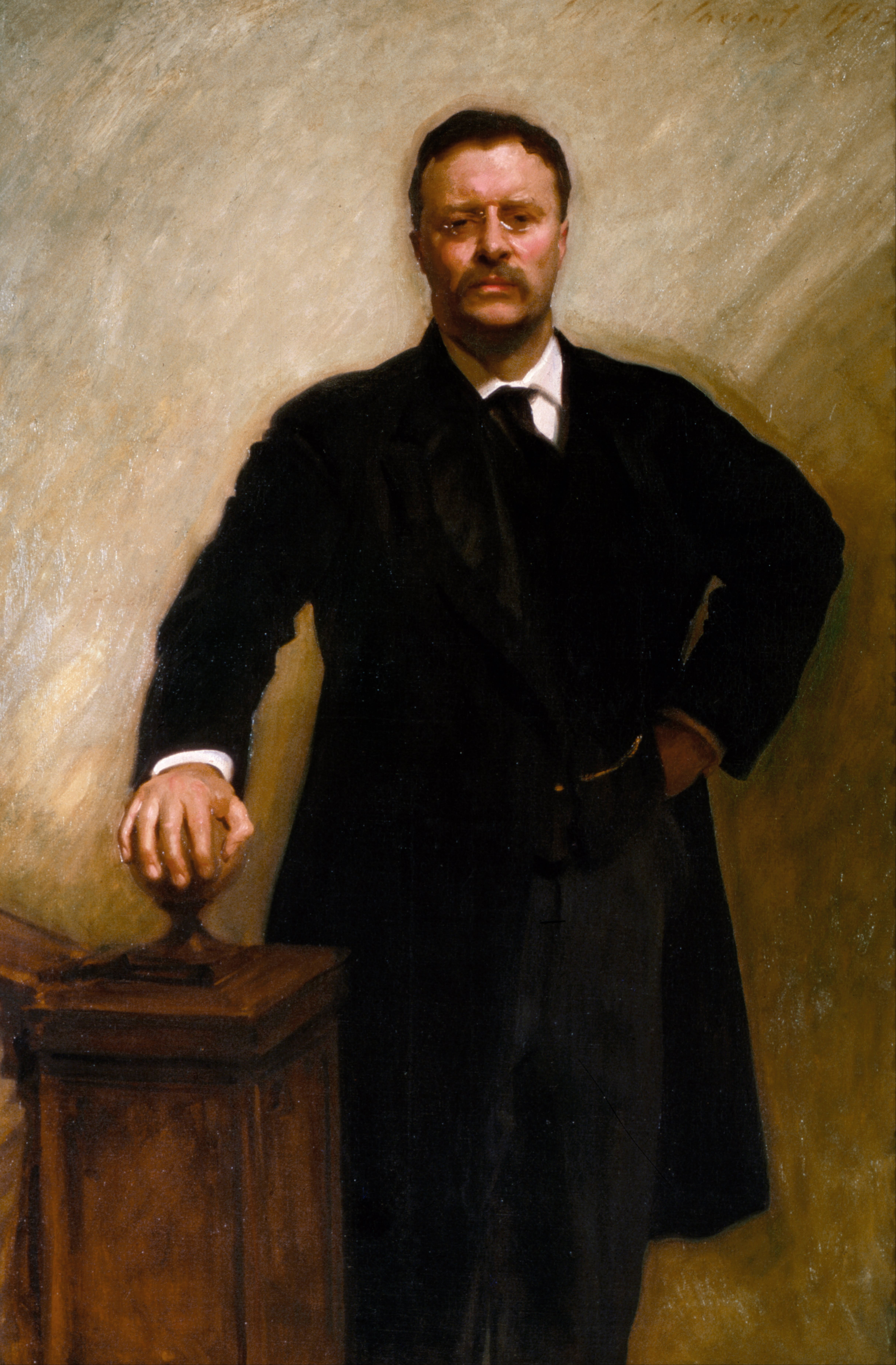
5 – 1903

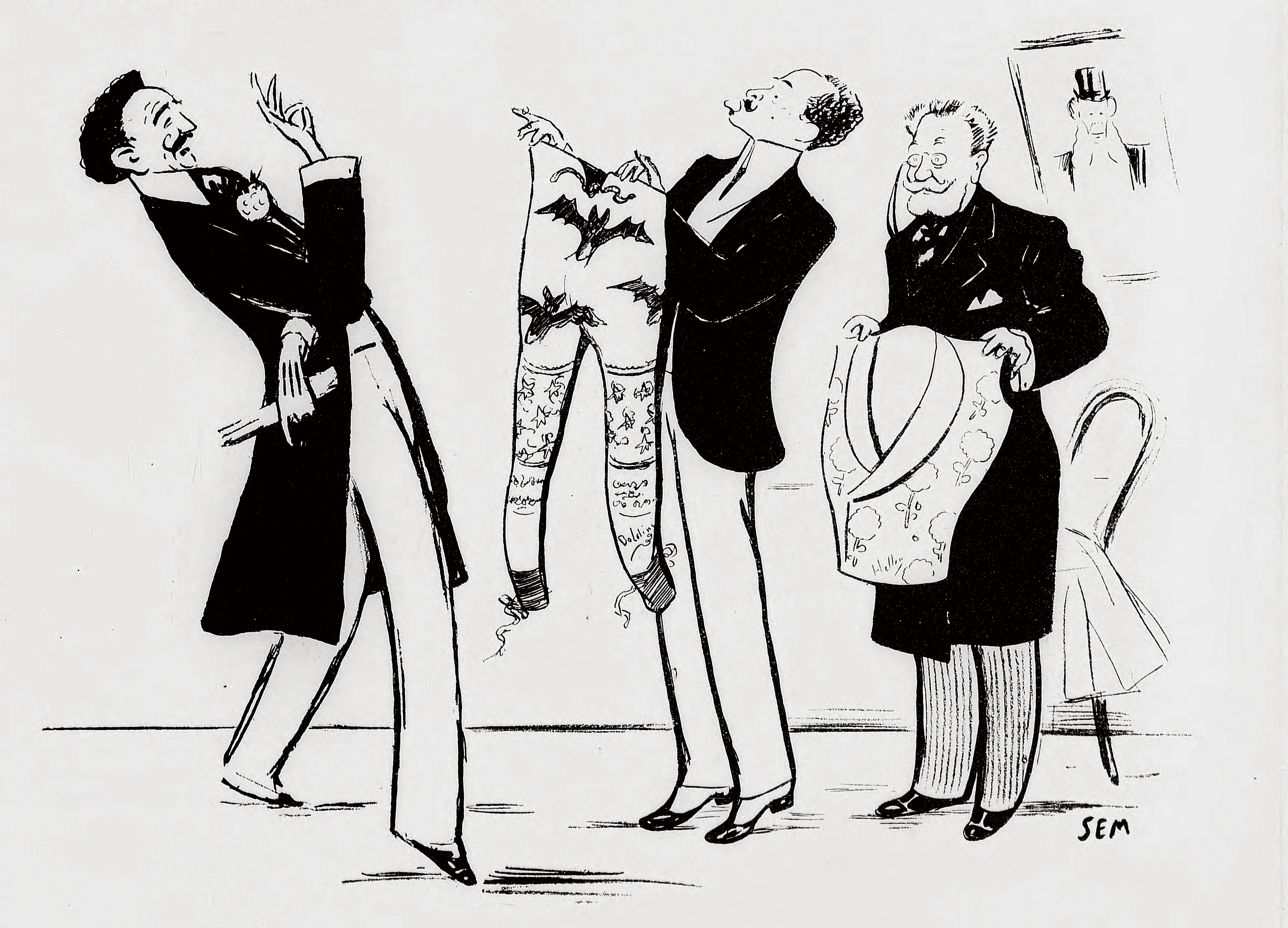
6 - 1903

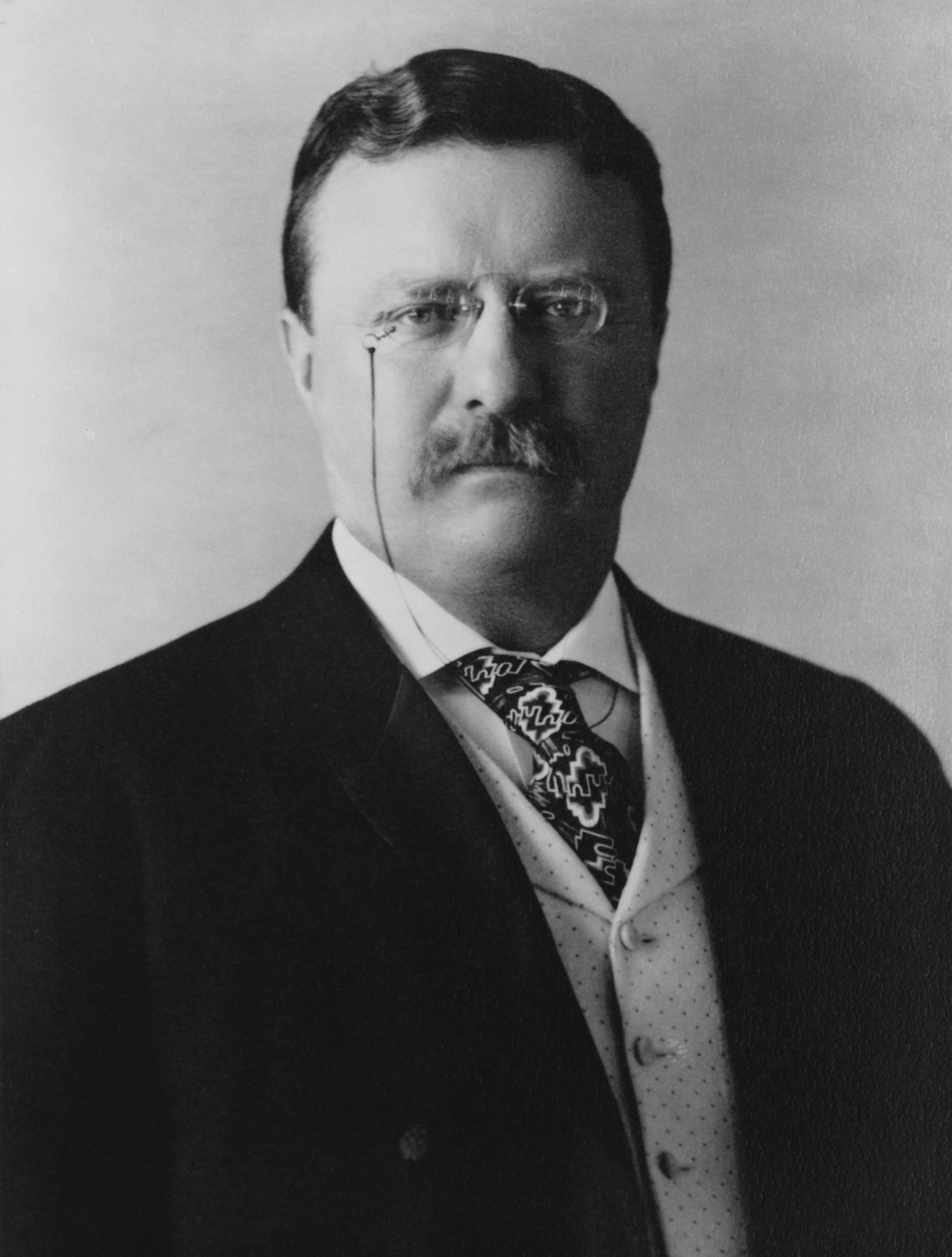
7 – 1904

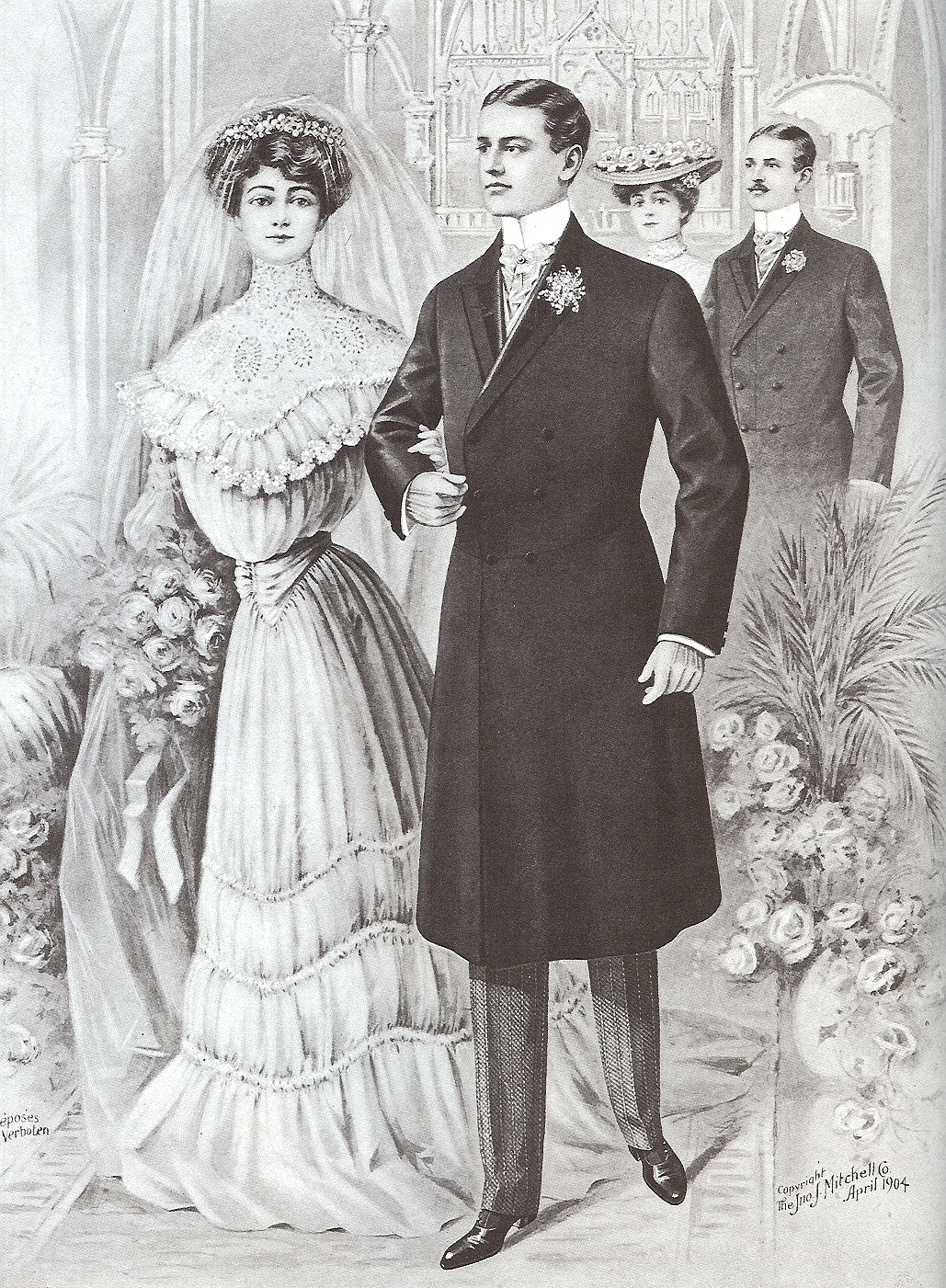
8 – 1904

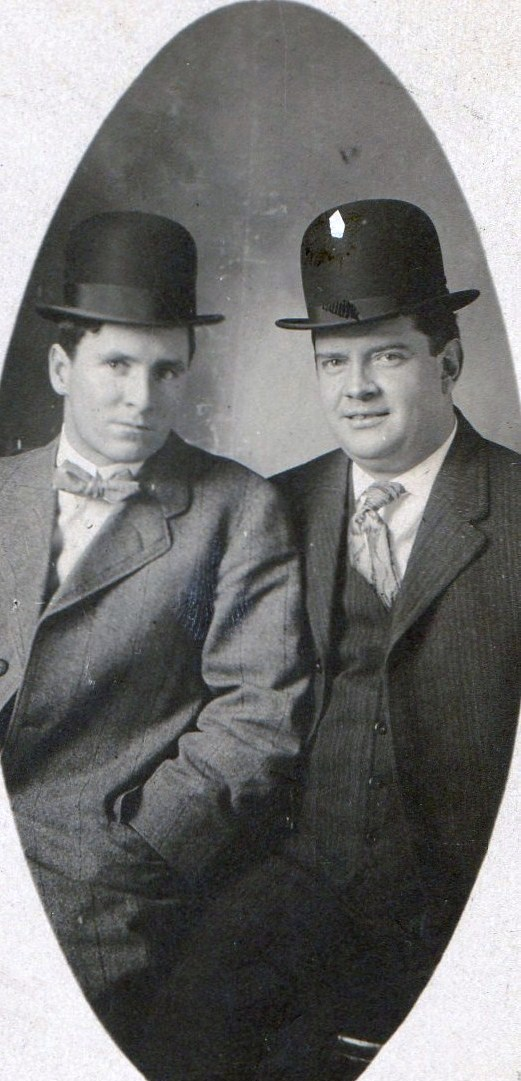
9 – 1905

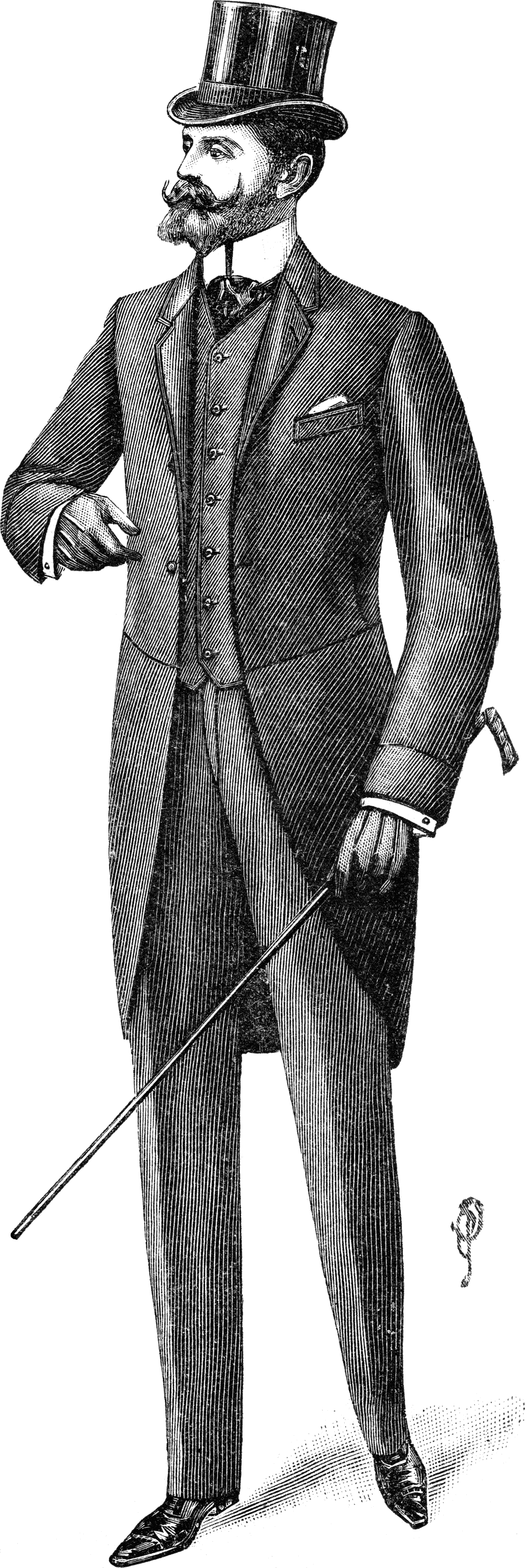
1 – 1906

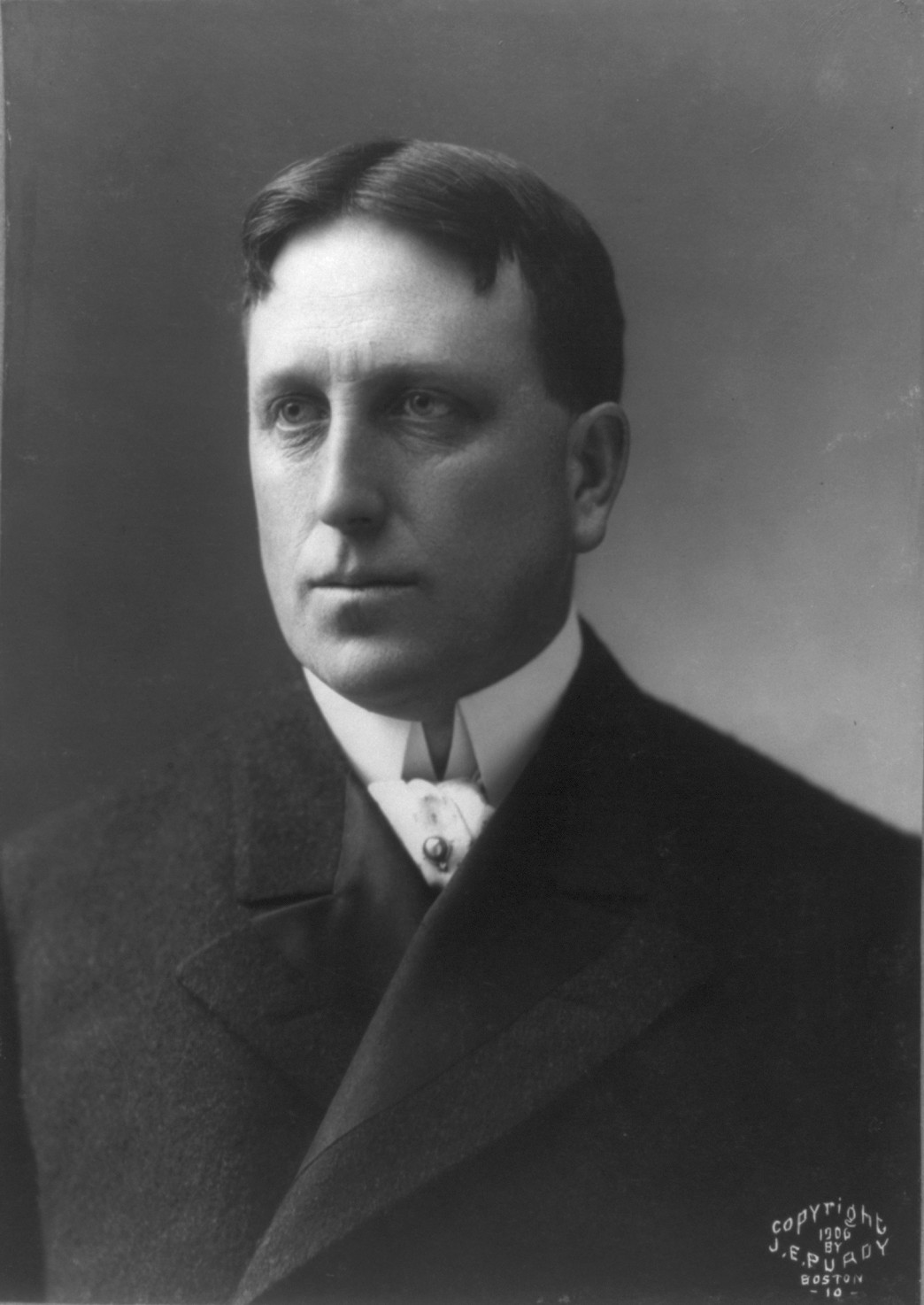
2 - 1906
1. Antoni Wodzicki wears a fur-collared overcoat and a Homburg, 1900.
2. Fashion illustration of a topcoat (left, worn with a top hat and morning dress) and overcoat (right, worn with business dress and Homburg), December 1900.
3. Fashion plate from the Sartorial Arts Journal shows a three-button suite with patch pockets (left) and a golfing costume consisting of a Norfolk jacket and knickerbockers (right), 1901.
4. Staffmembers of the Tuskegee Institute wear coats with high front openings and contrasting trousers, many striped, c. 1902.
5. Portrait of Theodore Roosevelt by John Singer Sargent in a formal frock coat, 1903.
6. Caricature of a fitting at Charvet in 1903.
7. Portrait of Theodore Roosevelt in a vividly patterned tie, light waistcoat, and dark coat, 1904. The very short hairstyle is typical of the period.
8. Formal frock coat, 1904.
9. Two Irishmen in San Francisco wearing bowler hats, 1905.
10. Men's formal daywear consists of a cutaway morning coat, high-buttoned waistcoat, and creased fly-front trousers worn with a high-collared shirt, top hat, and gloves, 1906.
11. Photo William Randolph Hearst wears a coat with a very high closure, a stiff collar, and a tie with a stickpin, 1906.

=== Style gallery 1907-1909 ===
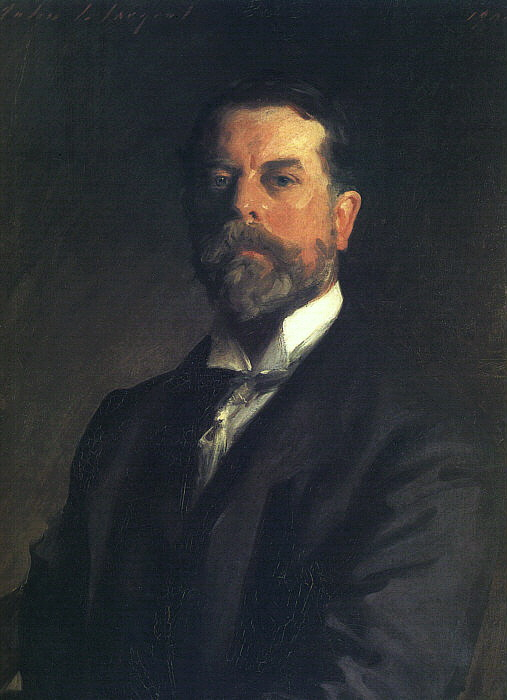
1 – 1907

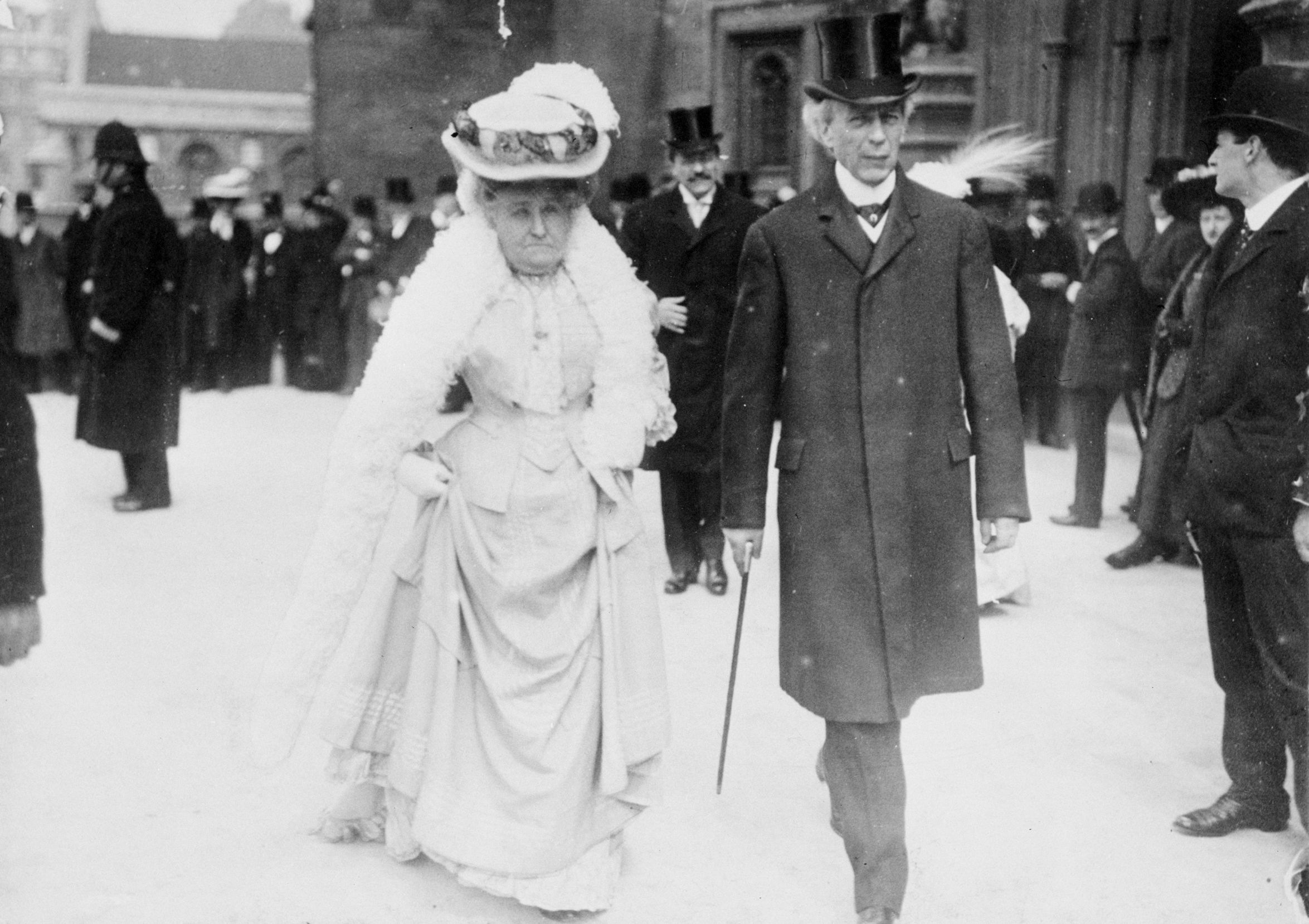
2 – 1907

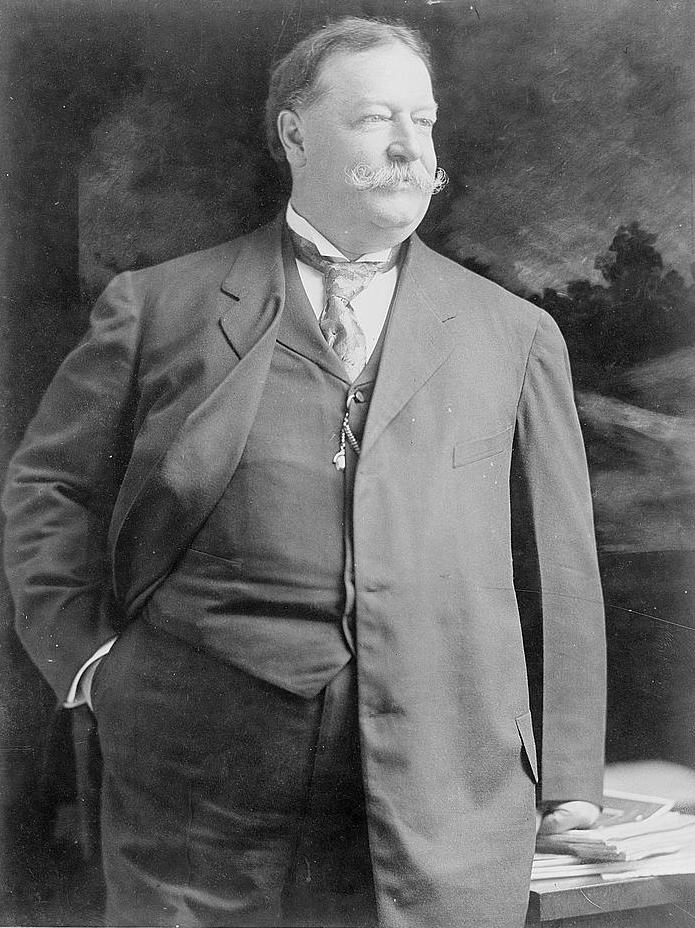
3 - c. 1907

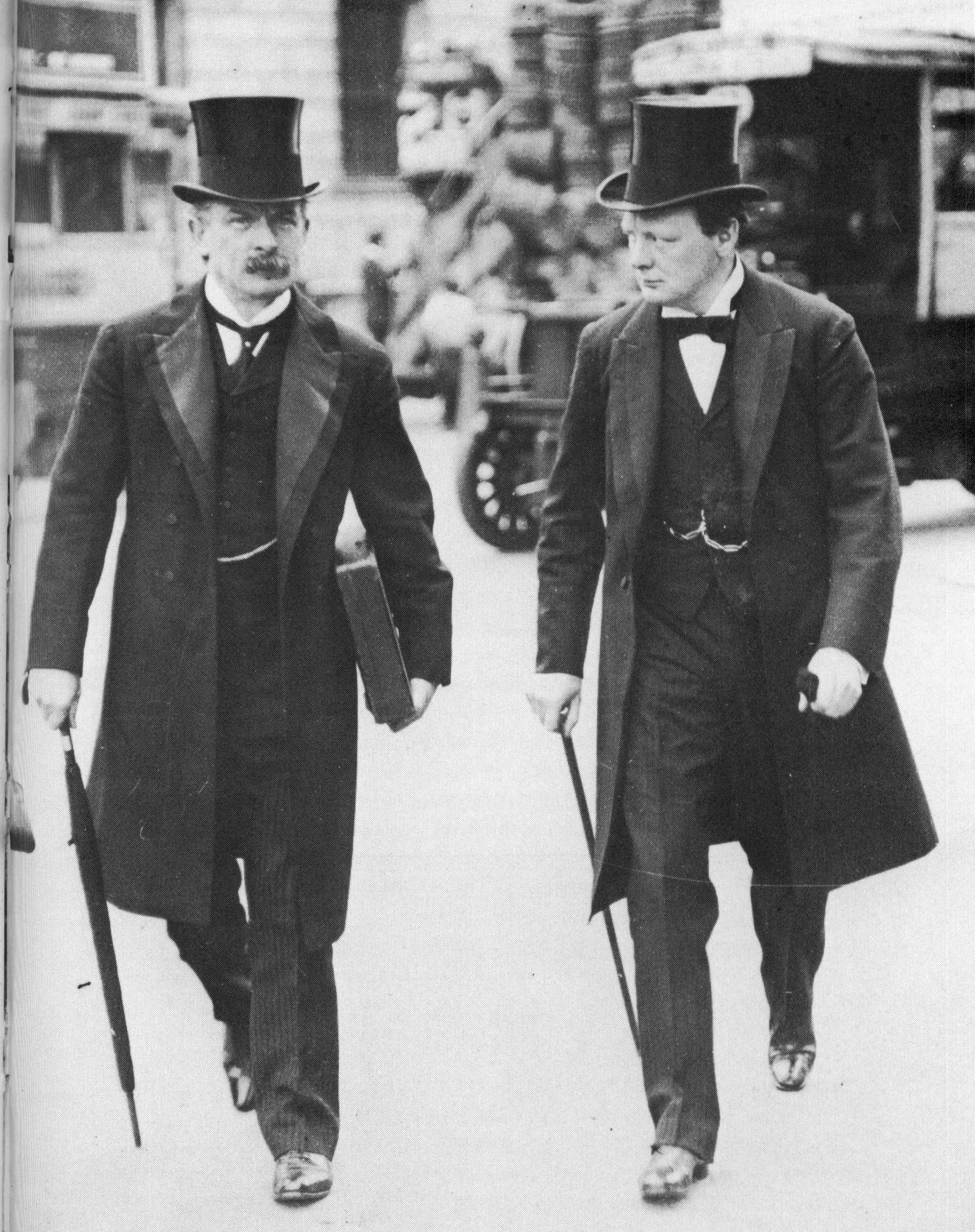
4 - 1907

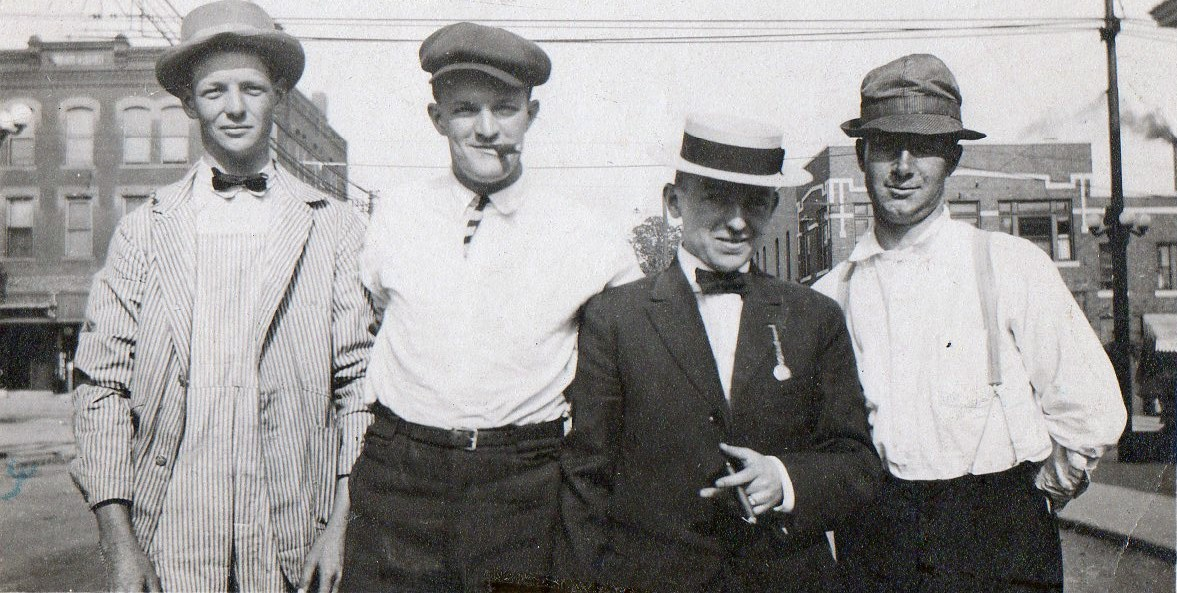
5 – 1909
1. John Singer Sargent wears a gray formal coat and a winged-collar shirt, 1907.
2. Wilfrid Laurier, the Prime Minister of Canada and his wife, 1907
3. Photo of William Howard Taft in a three-piece suit, c. 1907.
4. British formal dress: David Lloyd George (left) and Winston Churchill wear frock coats and top hats, 1907.
5. Irish immigrants in Kansas City, Missouri, 1909. The man second from the left is wearing a flat cap.

== Children's fashion ==
Girls' fashion for this time period imitated older women of the same period. Girls wore dresses of knee length, with trimmings at the hem such as lace and embroidery similar to women's lingerie dresses. Normally, black shoes or button up / lace up boots and woolen stockings went with the dress as well as kidskin or crochet gloves. Their hair was generally worn long and curly with decorations of ribbon. For play, bloomers and woolen jerseys were acceptable.

A new attempt was made to design garments that are more suitable for playing by designing girls' dresses with short sleeves. Outside, button up boots would have been worn or lace up boots also shoes with spats would have been worn in the winter spats worn over shoes created the look of wearing a long boot. Kid leather gloves would have been worn to cover the hands or lace gloves in the summer. Bonnets were being replaced by hats by the end of the Victorian era so girls would have worn a hat when out.

Young boys found comfort in Russian style blouses.

Fashionable clothing for boys included sailor suits, consisting of a shirt with a sailor collar and trousers or knickerbockers. For automobiling, boys wore a duster with knickerbockers, a flat cap, and goggles.

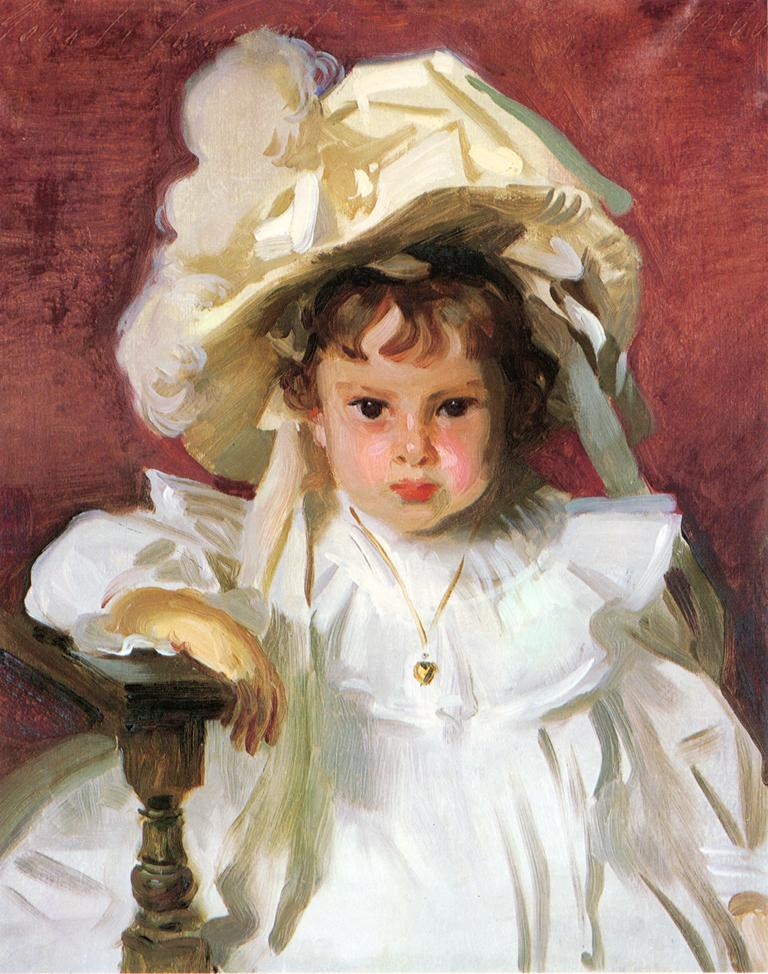
Even tiny girls were dressed in large hats, 1900

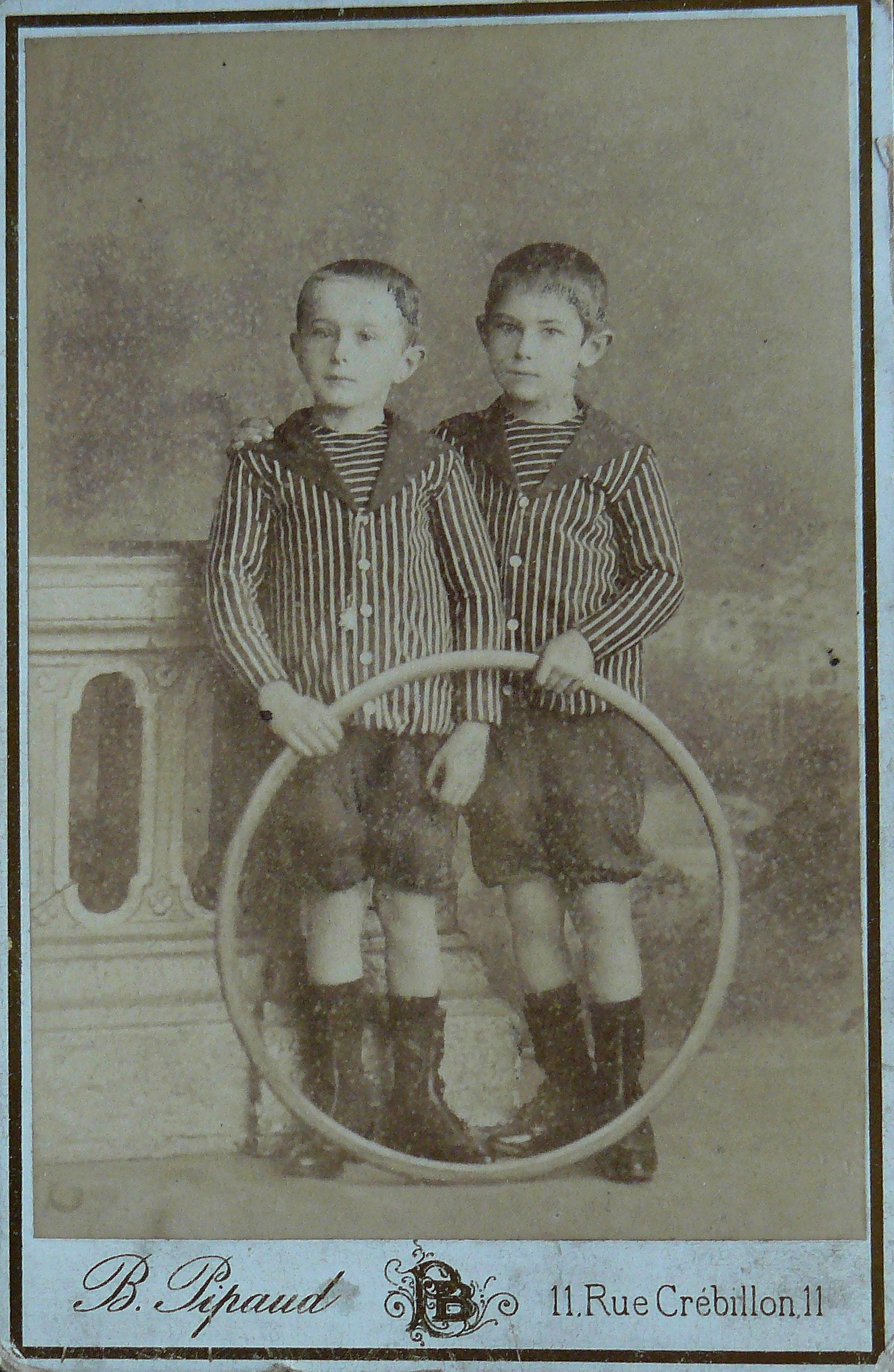
Two French boys wearing knickerbockers, 1900

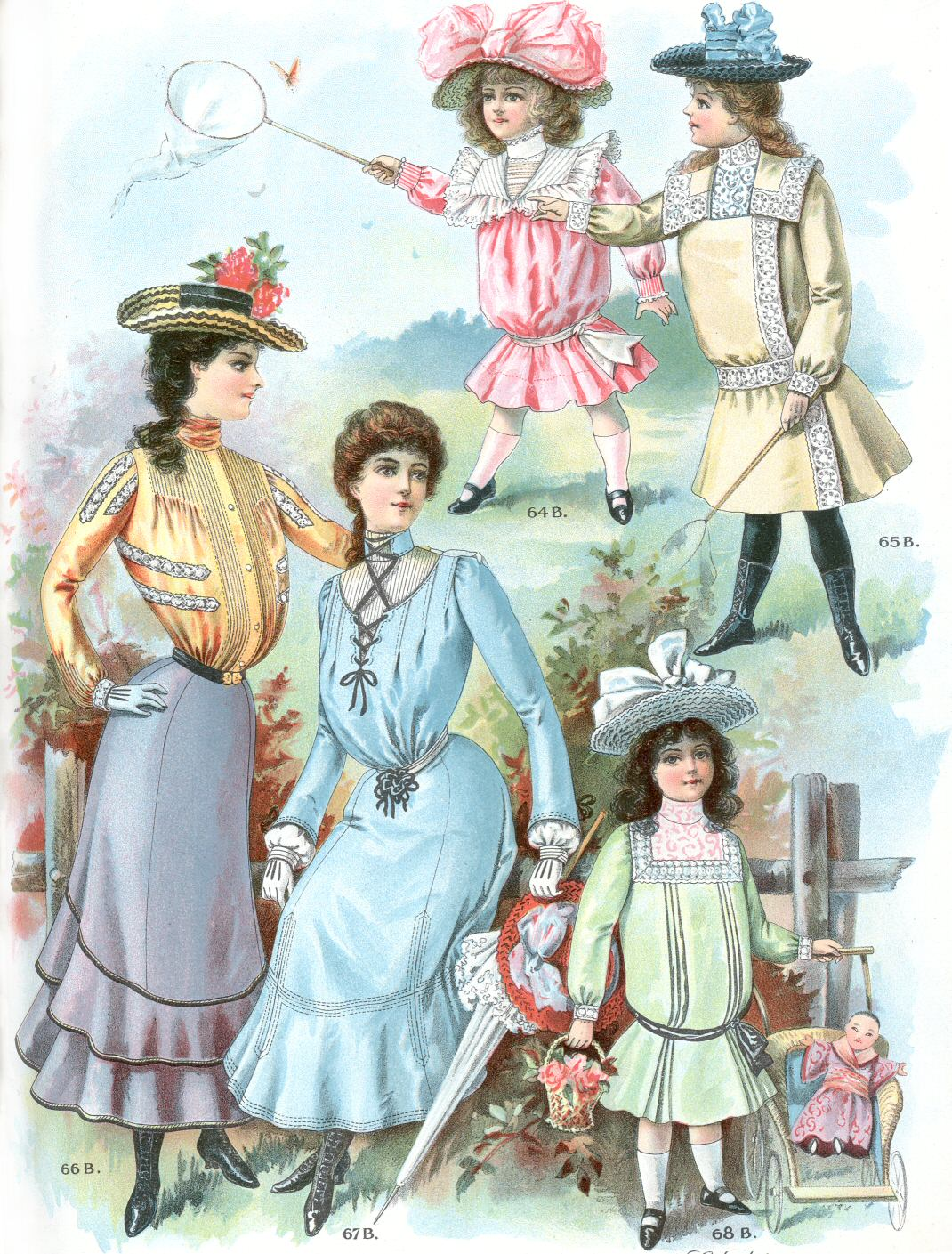
Girls' fashions for August 1901

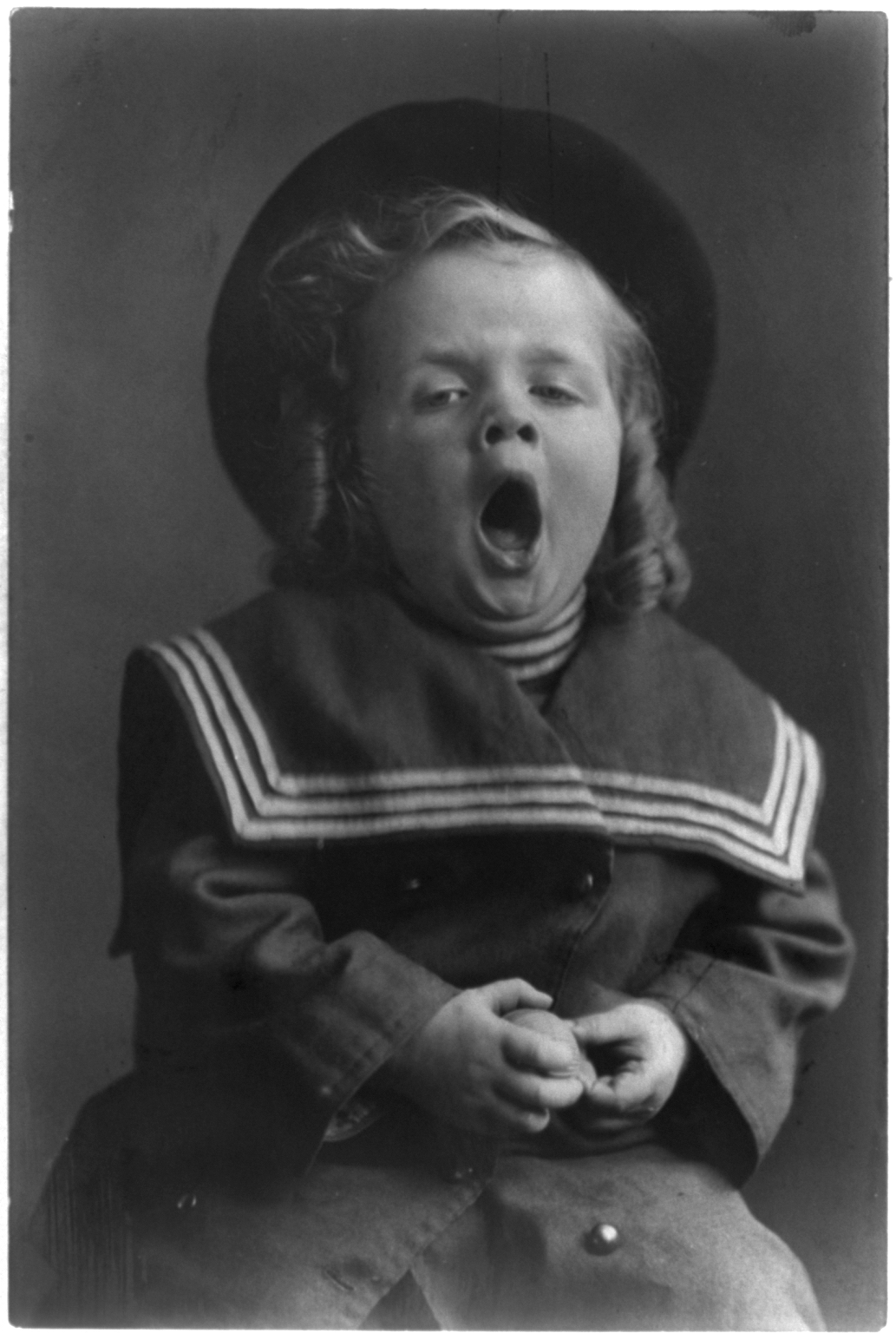
Small boy in a sailor suit, 1909

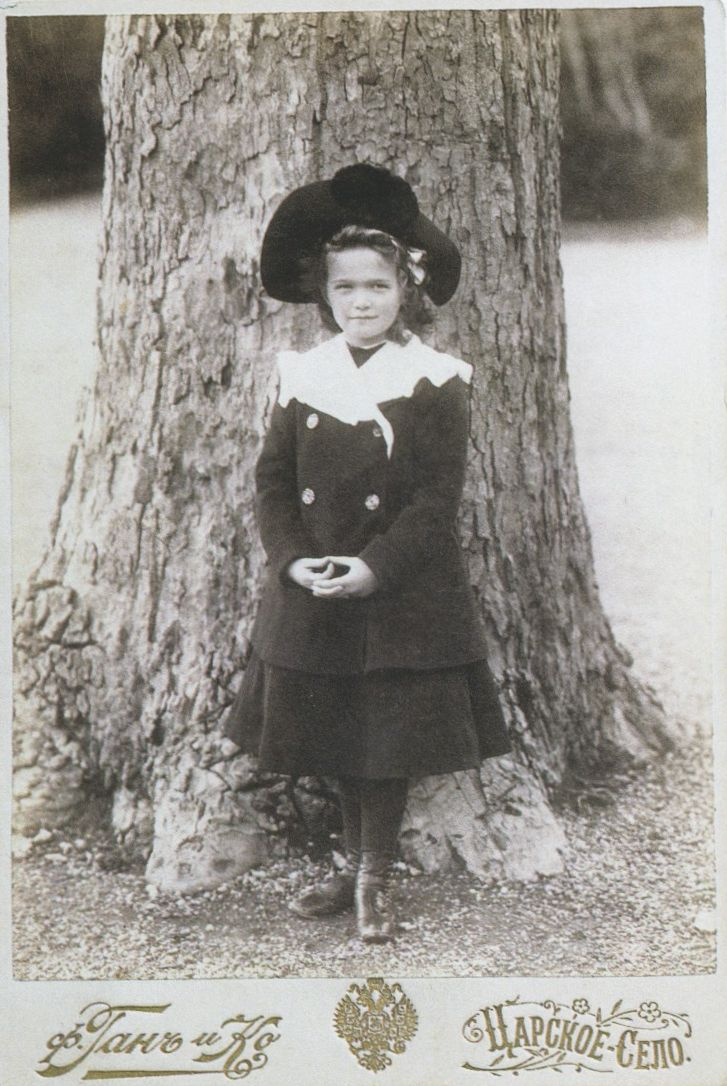
Olga Nikolaevna of Russia 1902

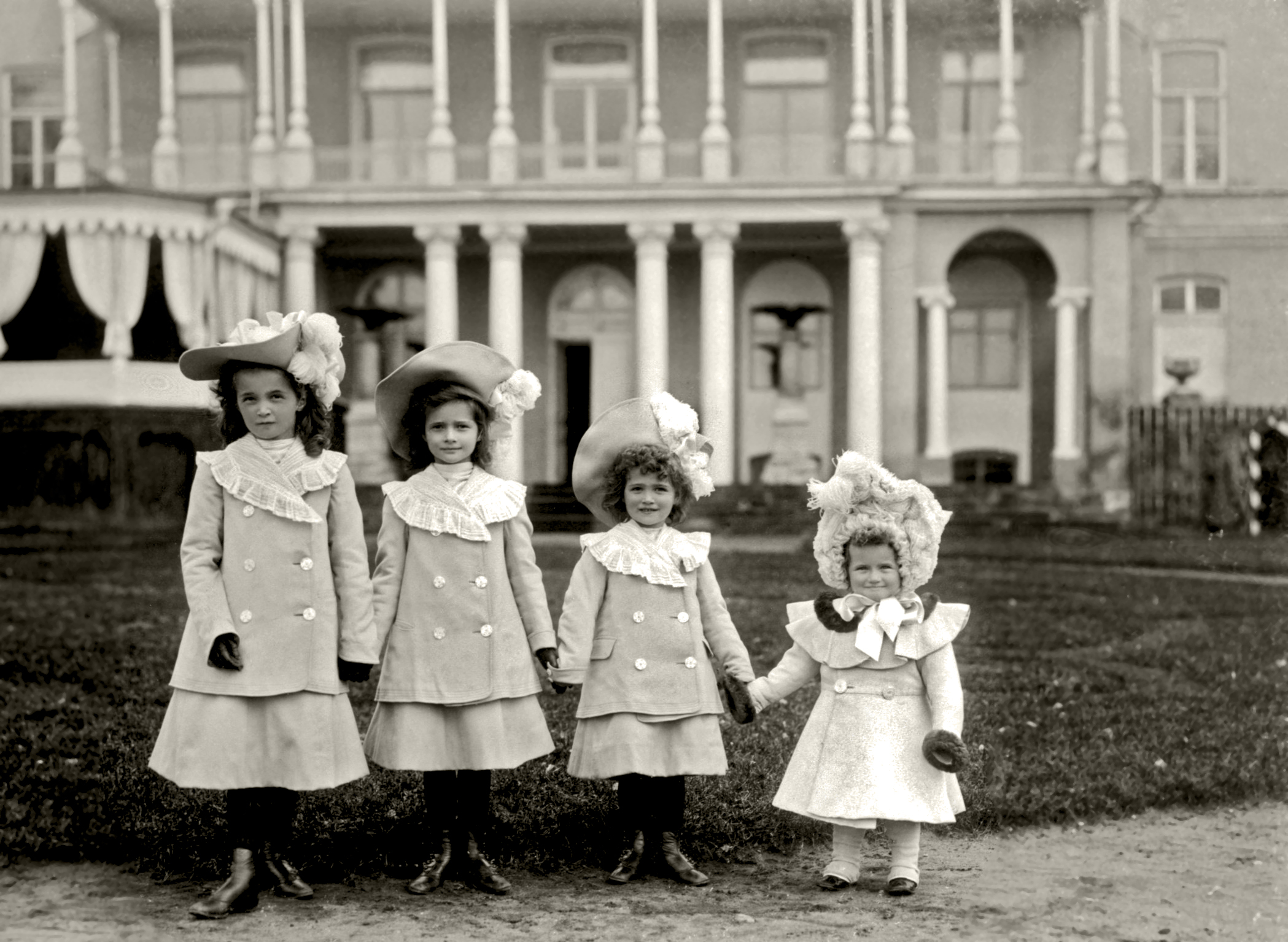
Olga, Tatiana, Maria and Anastasia Nikolaevna, 1903

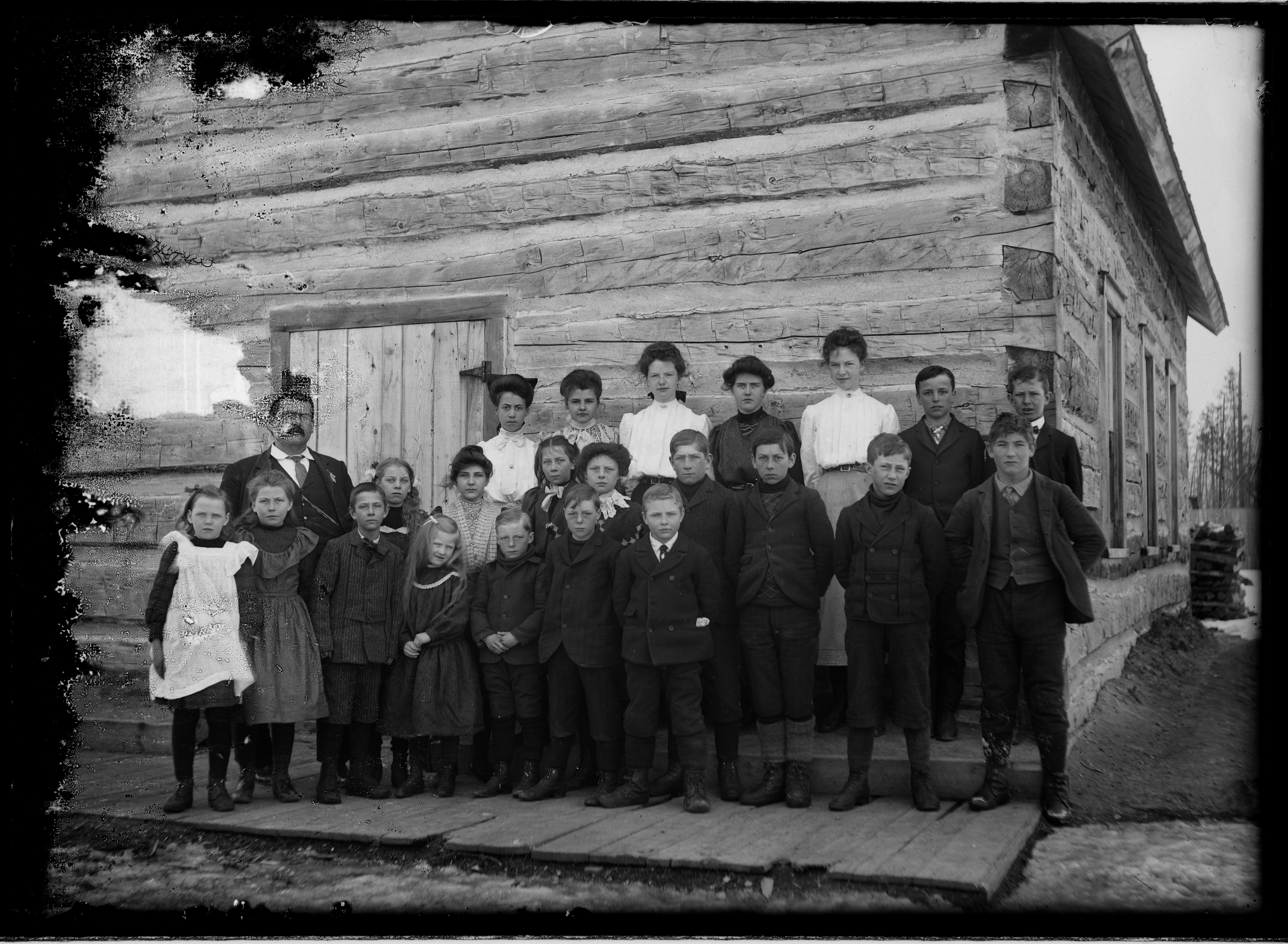
School children from the Rainy River District, 1900s.

== Working clothes ==
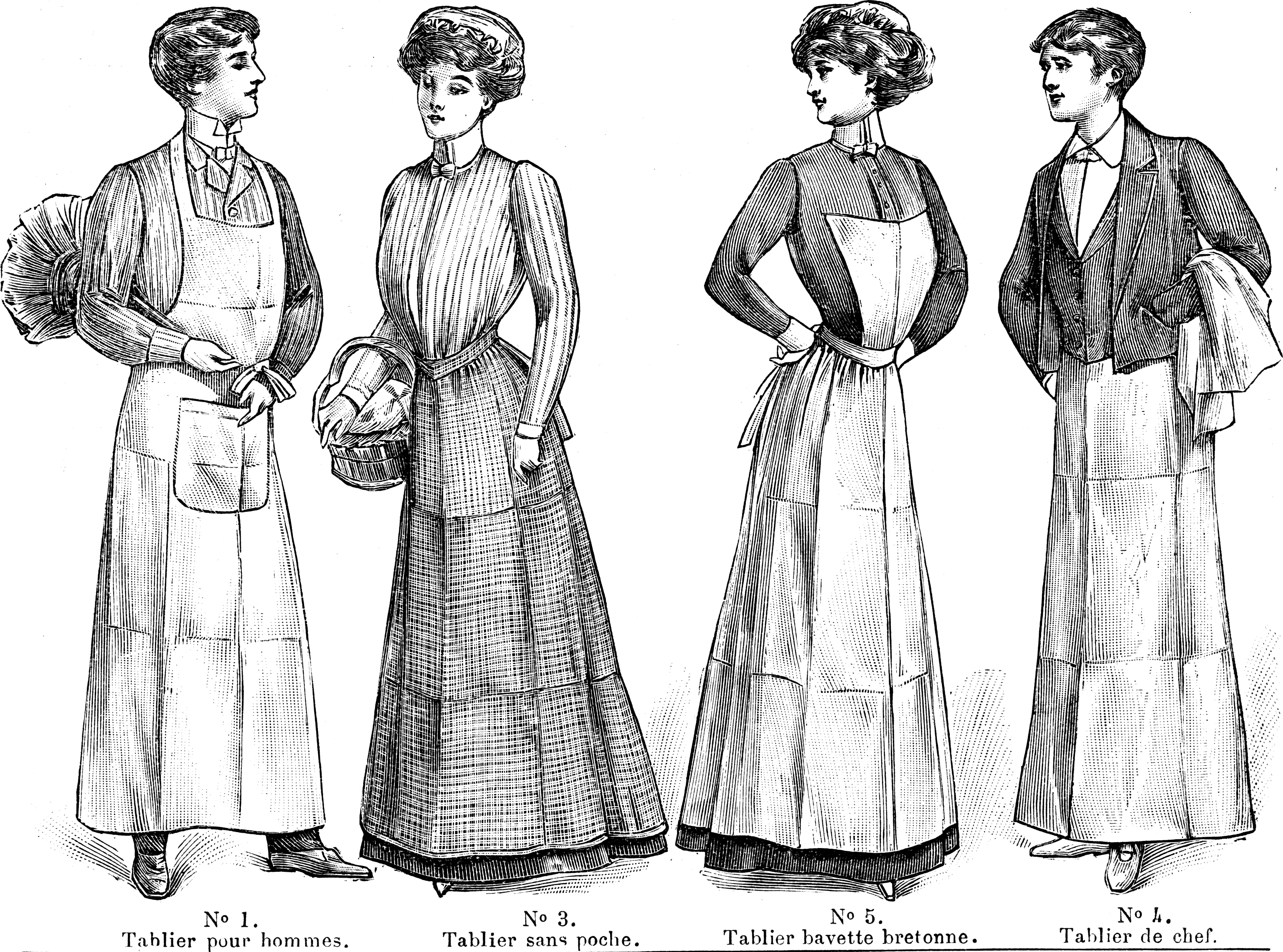
Aprons, from a 1909 catalogue

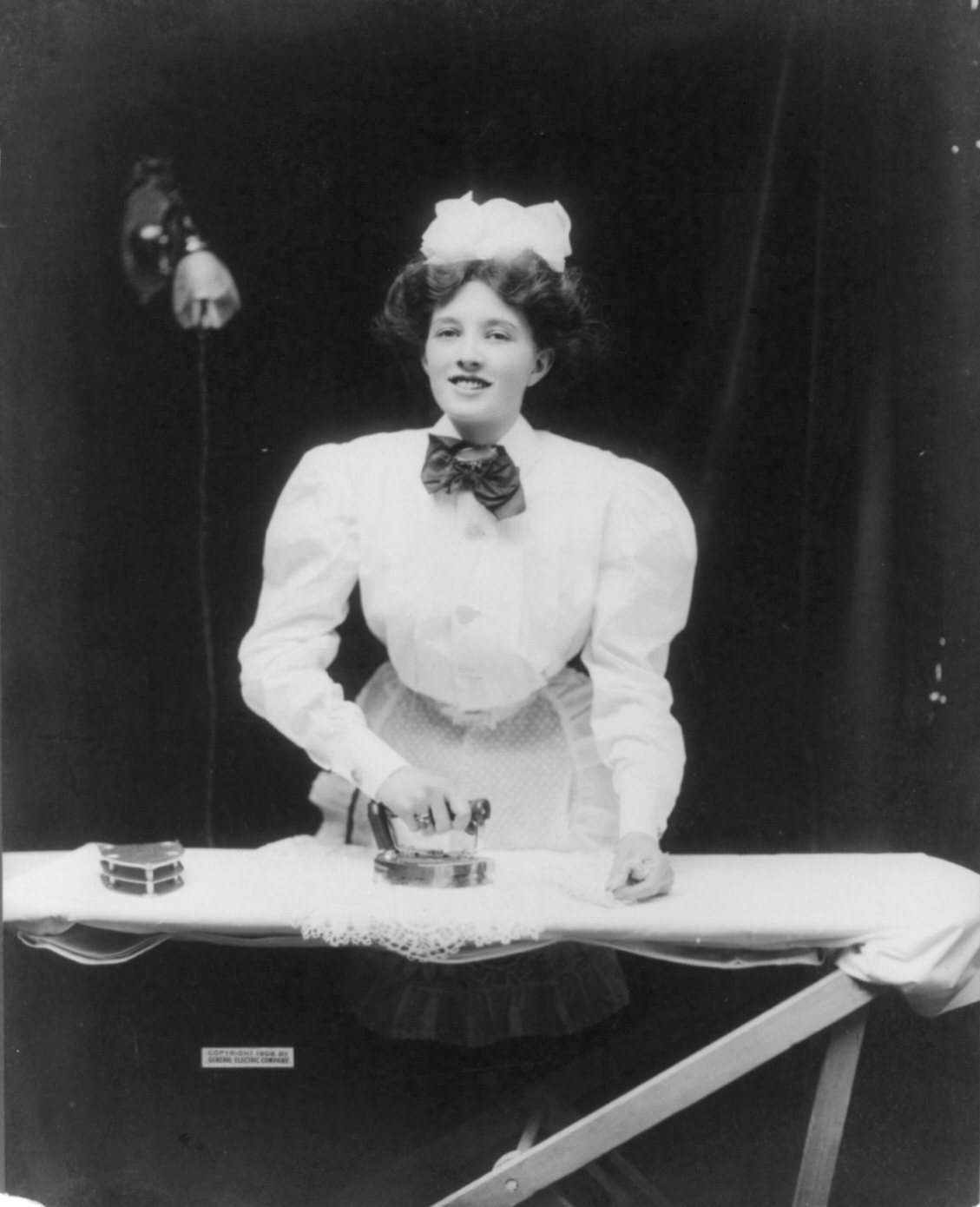
Housemaid ironing, 1908

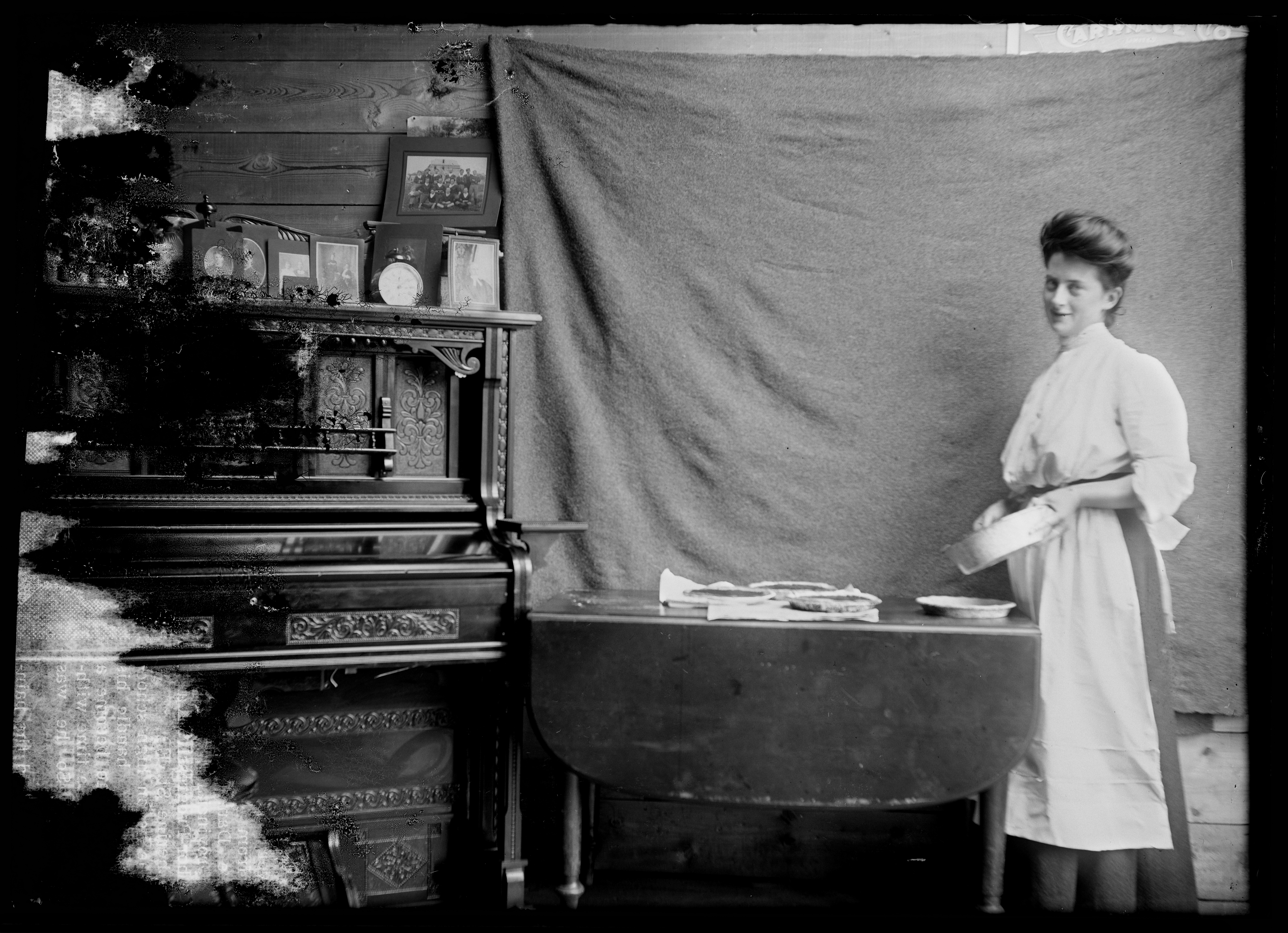
Woman in a kitchen in the Rainy River District, c. 1905.

== See also ==
- Belle Époque
- Charvet Place Vendôme
- Dress code
- Edwardian era
- History of fashion design

== Bibliography ==
- Arnold, Janet: Patterns of Fashion 2: Englishwomen's Dresses and Their Construction C.1860–1940, Wace 1966, Macmillan 1972. Revised metric edition, Drama Books 1977. ISBN 0-89676-027-8
- Ashelford, Jane: The Art of Dress: Clothing and Society 1500–1914, Abrams, 1996. ISBN 0-8109-6317-5
- Laver, James: The Concise History of Costume and Fashion, Abrams, 1979.
- Nunn, Joan: Fashion in Costume, 1200–2000, 2nd edition, A & C Black (Publishers) Ltd; Chicago: New Amsterdam Books, 2000. (Excerpts online at The Victorian Web)
- Steele, Valerie: Paris Fashion: A Cultural History, Oxford University Press, 1988, ISBN 0-19-504465-7
- Steele, Valerie: The Corset, Yale University Press, 2001

=== Surviving clothing ===
- Lingerie dresses at Kent State University
- 1900-1910 Fashions in the Staten Island Historical Society Online Collections Database
