= Andy's Gang =

American children's television series

Andy's Gang is a children's television program broadcast on NBC from August 20, 1955, to December 31, 1960, hosted by the actor Andy Devine. It was the successor to the radio and television program Smilin' Ed McConnell and His Buster Brown Gang (later shortened to Smilin' Ed's Gang). Devine took over the television program when McConnell died suddenly of a heart attack in 1954. Devine inherited a number of characters from the earlier show and the sponsor, Buster Brown shoes.

== Cast ==
The cast of the program included:

- Andy Devine
- Nino Marcel as Gunga Ram
- June Foray as the voice of Midnight the Cat and Old Grandie the Witch
- Billy Gilbert as the teacher
- Lou Krugman as the Maharajah
- Jerry Maren as Buster Brown
- Alan Reed as the poet
- Vito Scotti as Pasta Fazooli and Rama
- Bud Tollefson as the voice of Tige, the dog

== Smilin' Ed McConnell ==
Smilin' Ed McConnell and his Buster Brown Gang was one of the first children's TV shows filmed in Hollywood. In the original shows, McConnell started the program by greeting the audience—"Hiya, kids"—after which the audience sang a song for the sponsor, Buster Brown shoes: "I got shoes, you got shoes, everybody's got to have shoes, but there's only one kind of shoe for me—good old Buster Brown shoes!" Then Ed said, "Thank you buddies and sweethearts. Good old Buster Brown shoes are on the air out here in Hollywood for another good old Saturday hullabaloo." Produced on a small budget, the show was a success, bringing to life the Buster Brown advertising characters that had existed for decades and helping to sell millions of shoes. The show was initially filmed in front of a live audience, but as McConnell's health deteriorated, prefilmed children's reaction shots were intercut with the studio performance.

Music and stories from "Smilin' Ed's Storybook" were regular features. The show also featured "Gunga, the East India Boy," a serial set in India. Led by the Maharajah, Gunga Ram and his pal Rama set out on adventures around the village of Bakore in filmed segments.

A popular segment was the visit from the green puppet Froggy the Gremlin, who would appear in a puff of smoke ("Hiya, kids! Hiya, hiya, hiya!") when McConnell yelled the catchphrase "Plunk your magic twanger, Froggy!" The same phrase was later used by Andy Devine. Froggy was always interrupting the story and causing trouble.

McConnell died of a heart attack in 1954. Andy Devine took over the show in 1955.

== Andy Devine ==
After McConnell's death, the show was hosted by the rough-voiced, gentle giant Andy Devine, who had earlier appeared as Jingles on The Adventures of Wild Bill Hickok with Guy Madison. Studio reaction shots were again intercut, and Devine did his segments without a live audience. This also allowed some limited special effects, such as when Froggy appeared or disappeared.

The show began with Devine sitting in a big easy chair, reading from a book, Andy's Stories, which were illustrated by film clips. Regular characters were Midnight the Cat, Squeeky the Mouse (portrayed by a hamster), and Grandie the Talking Piano. Midnight, a big black cat, would sometimes operate an organ grinder. Midnight would also sometimes say "Nice" in a falsetto meow when asked what she thought about something.

In filmed segments, Gunga Ram was an Indian boy played by Nino Marcel. Gunga (Ghanga Rama during Smilin' Ed's tenure) and his friend Rama (Vito Scotti) helped out the Maharajah.

The comic actor Billy Gilbert regularly appeared on the show and was often interrupted by Froggy or told to do what Froggy wanted. The enraged Gilbert would then chase Froggy until he disappeared. One surviving clip shows Vito Scotti trying to explain singing while Froggy keeps interrupting or making fun of him; eventually, Scotti tries to grab Froggy, but the gremlin suddenly disappears.

Devine closed with, "Yes, sir, we're pals, and pals stick together. And now, gang, don't forget church or Sunday school."

== Legacy ==
Some of the original filmed programs hosted by Devine have survived, including a few segments filmed in color near the end of the show's run in 1960. VHS and DVD home videos of the programs have been issued. Clips of the telecasts are available on several websites. The entire inventory, over a ton of filmed programs and presumably the broadcast rights, are the property of Hubbard Broadcasting, of St. Paul, Minnesota.

Buckner & Garcia paid tribute to Smilin' Ed McConnell and Froggy the Gremlin in a 1982 novelty song, "Froggy's Lament," about the Konami arcade game Frogger, from their album Pac-Man Fever, with its lyrics "Hiya kids" and "Plunk your magic twanger, Froggy!"

Several clips from the show, including a sequence in which Midnight the Cat and Squeeky the Mouse perform the song Jesus Loves Me, were featured in the film The Movie Orgy.
