= June Foray =

American voice actress (1917–2017)

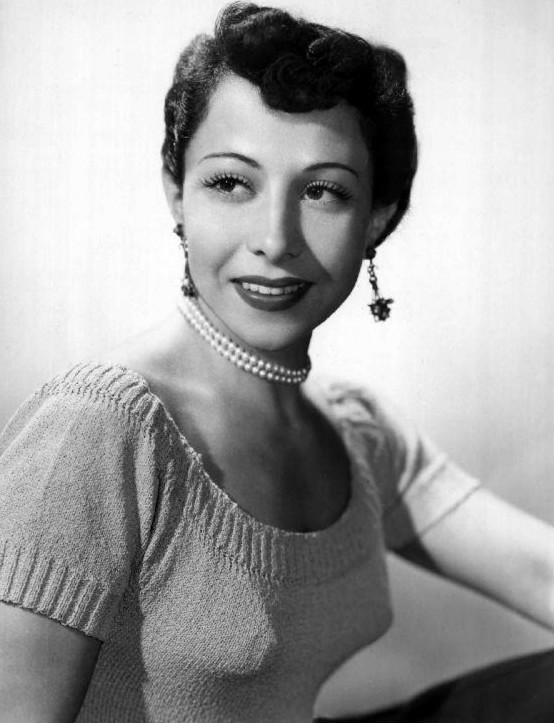
- Foray in 1952
- Born: June Lucille Forer; September 18, 1917; Springfield, Massachusetts, U.S.
- Died: July 26, 2017 (aged 99); Los Angeles, California, U.S.
- Occupations: Voice actress; radio personality
- Years active: 1929–2014
- Board member of: ASIFA-Hollywood
- Spouses: Bernard Barondess (m. 1941; div. 1953) Hobart Donovan (m. 1955; died 1976)
- Awards: Inkpot Award (1974); Annie Award (1996, 1997); Daytime Emmy Award (2012)

June Foray (born June Lucille Forer; September 18, 1917 – July 26, 2017) was an American voice actress and radio personality, best known as the voice of such animated characters as Rocky the Flying Squirrel, Natasha Fatale, Nell Fenwick, Lucifer from Disney's Cinderella, Cindy Lou Who, Jokey Smurf, Granny from the Warner Bros. cartoons directed by Friz Freleng, Grammi Gummi from Disney's Adventures of the Gummi Bears series, and Magica De Spell, among many others.

Her career encompassed radio, theatrical shorts, feature films, television, comedy and children's recordings – particularly with Stan Freberg – video games, talking toys, and other media.

Foray was one of the early members of ASIFA-Hollywood, the society devoted to promoting and encouraging animation. She is credited with the establishment of the Annie Awards, as well as being instrumental in the creation of the Academy Award for Best Animated Feature in 2001. She has a star on the Hollywood Walk of Fame honoring her voice work in television.

Chuck Jones was quoted as saying: "June Foray is not the female Mel Blanc. Mel Blanc was the male June Foray."

== Early life ==
June Lucille Forer was born on September 18, 1917, in Springfield, Massachusetts, one of three children of Ida (née Robinson, 1893–1975) and Morris Forer (1886–1958). Her mother was of Lithuanian Jewish and French Canadian ancestry, and her father was a Jewish emigrant from Odessa, Russian Empire. The family resided at 75 Orange Street, Forest Park. As a small child, Foray first wanted to be a dancer, so her mother sent her to local classes, but she had to drop out due to a case of pneumonia. Her voice was first broadcast in a local radio drama when she was 12 years old; by age 15, she was doing regular radio voice work.

Two years later, after graduating from Classical High School, she moved with her parents and siblings to live in Los Angeles, near Ida's brother, after Morris Forer, an engineer, fell on hard financial times.

== Acting career ==
After entering radio through the WBZA Players, Foray starred in her own radio series Lady Make Believe in the late 1930s. She soon became a popular voice actress, with regular appearances on coast-to-coast network shows including Lux Radio Theatre and The Jimmy Durante Show.

In the 1940s, Foray also began film work, including a few roles in live action movies, but mostly did voice over work for animated cartoons and radio programs and occasionally dubbing films and television. On radio, Foray did the voices of Midnight the Cat and Old Grandie the Piano on The Buster Brown Program, which starred Smilin' Ed McConnell, from 1944 to 1952. She later did voices on the Mutual Broadcasting System program Smile Time for Steve Allen. Her work in radio ultimately led her to recording for a number of children's albums for Capitol Records.

For Walt Disney, Foray voiced Lucifer the Cat in the feature film Cinderella, Lambert's mother in Lambert the Sheepish Lion, a mermaid in Peter Pan and Witch Hazel in the Donald Duck short Trick or Treat. Decades later, Foray was the voice of Grandmother Fa in the 1998 animated Disney film Mulan. She also did a variety of voices in Walter Lantz Productions' Woody Woodpecker cartoons, including Woody's nephew and niece, Knothead and Splinter. Impressed by her performance as Witch Hazel, in 1954 Chuck Jones invited her to work on Warner Bros. Cartoons. For Warner Bros., she was Granny (whom she had played on vinyl records starting in 1950, before officially voicing her in Red Riding Hoodwinked, released in 1955, taking over for Bea Benaderet), owner of Tweety and Sylvester, and a series of witches, including Looney Tunes' own Witch Hazel, with Jones as director. Like most of Warner Bros.' voice actors at the time (with the exception of Mel Blanc), Foray was not credited for her roles in these cartoons. She played Bubbles on The Super 6 and Cindy Lou Who, asking "Santa" why he's taking their tree, in How the Grinch Stole Christmas. In 1960, she provided the speech for Mattel's original "Chatty Cathy" doll; capitalizing on this, Foray also voiced the malevolent "Talky Tina" doll in the Twilight Zone episode "Living Doll", first aired on November 1, 1963.

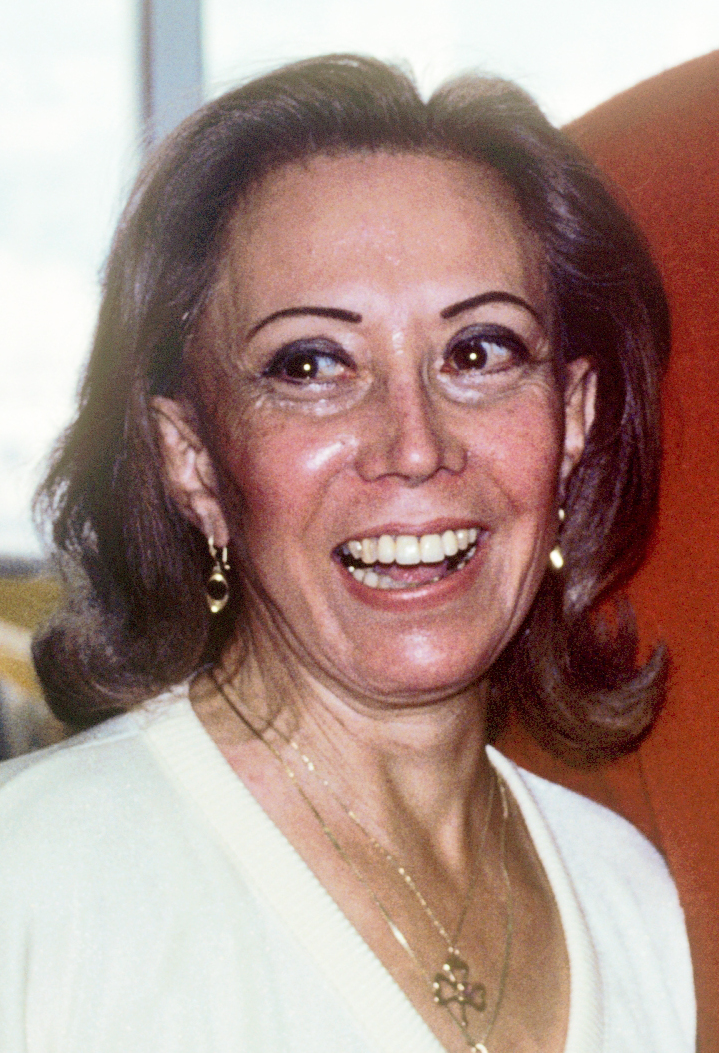
Foray in 1978

Foray worked for Hanna-Barbera, including on Scooby-Doo, Where Are You!, The Jetsons, The Flintstones and many other shows. In 1959, she auditioned for the part of Betty Rubble on The Flintstones and voiced the character in the original pilot episode, opposite Mel Blanc who voiced Betty's husband, Barney Rubble, but Bea Benaderet was eventually cast in the role; Foray described herself as "terribly disappointed" at not getting to play Betty. Foray eventually made a guest appearance on The Flintstones as the voice of Granny Hatrock in the episode "The Bedrock Hillbillies".

She did extensive voice acting for Stan Freberg's commercials, albums, and 1957 radio series, memorably as secretary to the werewolf advertising executive. She also appeared in several Rankin/Bass TV specials in the 1960s and 1970s, voicing the young Karen and the teacher in the TV special Frosty the Snowman (although only her Karen singing parts remained in later airings, after Rankin-Bass re-edited the special a few years after it debuted, with Foray's dialogue re-dubbed by an uncredited child actress, Suzanne Davidson). She voiced all the female roles in Rikki-Tikki-Tavi (1975), including the villainous cobra Nagaina. She played multiple characters on The Rocky and Bullwinkle Show, including Natasha Fatale and Nell Fenwick, as well as male lead character Rocket J. Squirrel (a.k.a. Rocky Squirrel) for Jay Ward, and played Ursula on George of the Jungle; and also starred on Fractured Flickers.

In the mid-1960s, she became devoted to the preservation and promotion of animation and wrote numerous magazine articles about animation. She and a number of other animation artists had informal meetings around Hollywood in the 1960s, and later decided to formalize this as ASIFA-Hollywood, a chapter of the Association Internationale du Film d'Animation (the International Animated Film Association). She is credited with coming up with the idea of the Annie Awards in 1972, awarded by ASIFA-Hollywood, having noted that there had been no awards to celebrate the field of animation. In 1988, she was awarded the Bob Clampett Humanitarian Award. In 1995, ASIFA-Hollywood established the June Foray Award, which is awarded to "individuals who have made a significant and benevolent or charitable impact on the art and industry of animation". Foray was the first recipient of the award. She was an enthusiastic member of the Los Angeles Student Film Institute advisory board and frequent host and/or presenter at its annual festivals. In 2007, Foray became a contributor to ASIFA-Hollywood's Animation Archive Project. She also had sat on the Governors' board for the Academy of Motion Picture Arts & Sciences and lobbied for two decades for the academy to establish an Academy Award for animation; the academy created the Academy Award for Best Animated Feature in 2001 from her petitioning.

In 2007, Britt Irvin became the first person to voice a character in a cartoon remake that had been previously played by Foray in the original series when she voiced Ursula in the new George of the Jungle series on Cartoon Network. In 2011, Roz Ryan voiced Witch Lezah (Hazel spelled backwards) in The Looney Tunes Show, opposite June Foray as Granny. Foray also voiced May Parker in Spider-Man and His Amazing Friends (1981–83), as well as Raggedy Ann on several TV movies, Grandma Howard on Teen Wolf, Jokey Smurf and Mother Nature on The Smurfs, and Magica De Spell and Ma Beagle in DuckTales. At the same time, she had a leading role voicing Grammi Gummi on Disney's Adventures of the Gummi Bears, an animated series credited with kickstarting an era of dramatically increased artistic standards for television animation, working with her Rocky and Bullwinkle co-star Bill Scott until his death in 1985.

Foray guest starred only once on The Simpsons, in the season one episode "Some Enchanted Evening", as the receptionist for the Rubber Baby Buggy Bumper Babysitting Service. This was a play on a Rocky & Bullwinkle gag years earlier in which none of the cartoon's characters, including narrator William Conrad, were able to pronounce "rubber baby buggy bumpers" unerringly. Foray was later homaged by The Simpsons, in the season eight episode "The Itchy & Scratchy & Poochie Show", in which the character June Bellamy (voiced by Tress MacNeille) is introduced as the voice behind both Itchy and Scratchy. According to The Simpsons writer and producer Mike Reiss, Foray voiced a few parts at the first table read for The Simpsons in early 1989 "but she sounded too cartoony for our show".

Foray appeared on camera in a major role only once, in Sabaka, as the high priestess of a fire cult. She also appeared on camera in an episode of Green Acres as a Mexican telephone operator. In 1991, she provided her voice as the sock-puppet talk-show host Scary Mary on an episode of Married... with Children. She had a cameo role in Boris & Natasha (1992), but once again played Rocky and Natasha throughout the feature film The Adventures of Rocky and Bullwinkle (2000). Another on-camera appearance was as herself on an episode of the 1984 TV sitcom The Duck Factory.

She was also often called in for ADR voice work for television and feature films. This work included dubbing the voice of Mary Badham in Twilight Zone episode "The Bewitchin' Pool" and the voices for Sean and Michael Brody in some scenes of the film Jaws. She dubbed several people in Bells Are Ringing, Diana Rigg in some scenes of The Hospital, Robert Blake in drag in an episode of Baretta and a little boy in The Comic.

=== Later career ===
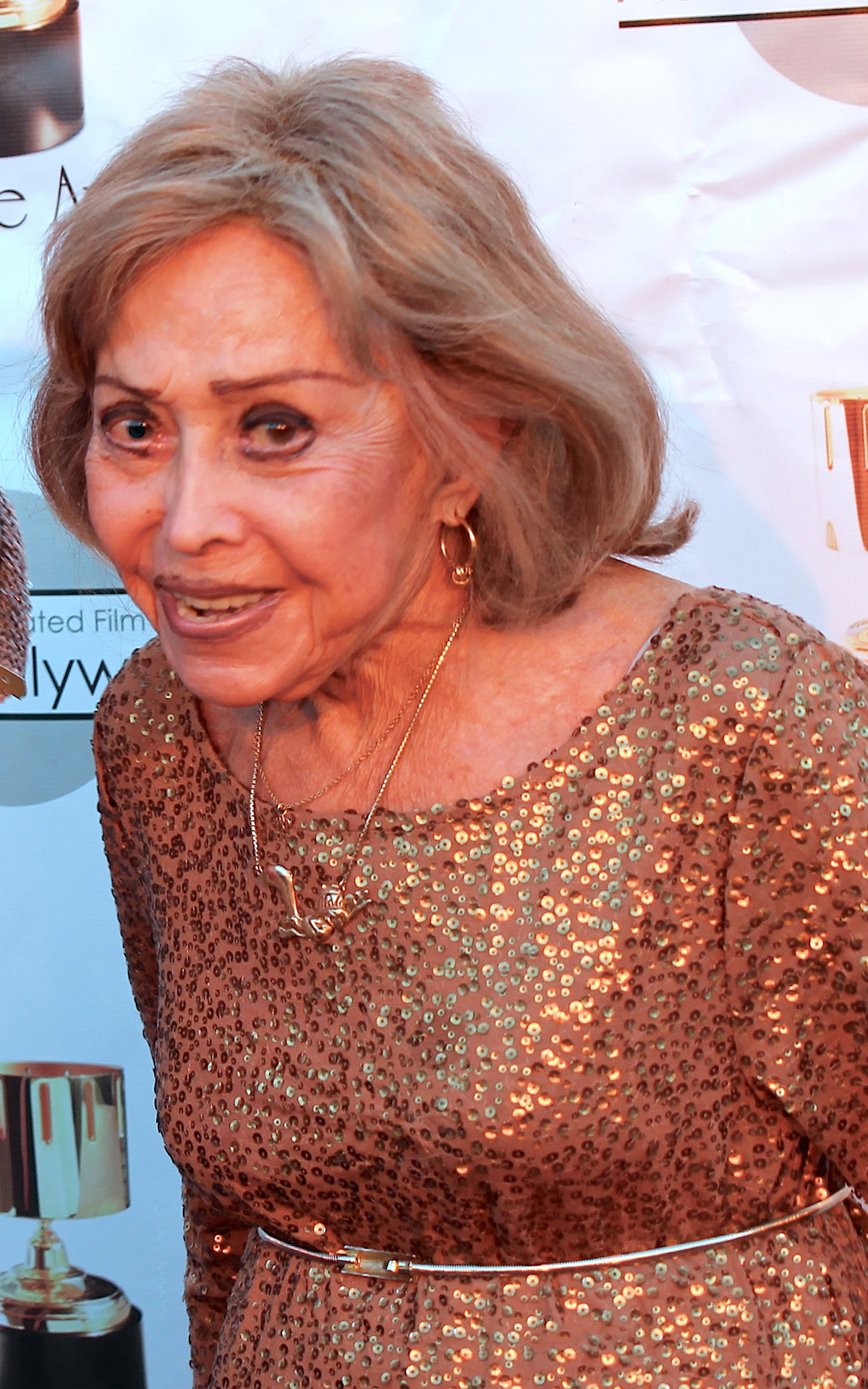
Foray in 2014

In 1996 and 1997, Foray won the Annie Award for Outstanding Individual Achievement for Voice Acting by a Female Performer in an Animated Television Production for her work in Sylvester and Tweety Mysteries. In 2000, Foray returned to play Rocky the Flying Squirrel in Universal Pictures' live-action/CGI animated film The Adventures of Rocky and Bullwinkle, co-starring and produced by Robert De Niro. On Season Three, Episode One ("The Thin White Line") of Family Guy, Foray again played Rocky in a visual gag with a single line ("And now, here's something we hope you'll really like!"). Foray voiced the wife of the man getting dunked ("Don't tell him, Carlos!") in the Pirates of the Caribbean attraction. In 2003, she guest starred as the Jay Ward inspired villain Madame Argentina in the Powerpuff Girls episode, "I See a Funny Cartoon in Your Future". During this time, Foray also had a regular role, reprising Granny on Baby Looney Tunes and also Witch Hazel in an episode of another Warner Bros. Animation series Duck Dodgers. In October 2006, she portrayed Susan B. Anthony on three episodes of the podcast The Radio Adventures of Dr. Floyd. In November 2009, Foray appeared twice on The Marvelous Misadventures of Flapjack: in one episode as Ruth, a pie-maker trapped in Bubbie's stomach, and in another episode as Kelly, a young boy having a birthday party and as Kelly's Mom and Captain K'Nuckles' kindergarten teacher.

In 2011, she reprised her role as Granny in Cartoon Network's The Looney Tunes Show, which was her last regular gig. That year, she received the Comic-Con Icon Award at the 2011 Scream Awards. She also appeared as Granny in the theatrically released Looney Tunes short, I Tawt I Taw a Puddy Tat, which was shortlisted for Academy Award consideration.

In 2012, Foray received her first Emmy nomination and won in the category of Outstanding Performer in an Animated Program for her role as Mrs. Cauldron on The Garfield Show. She thus became, at age 94, the oldest entertainer to be nominated for, and to win, an Emmy Award. In 2014, Foray reprised her role as Rocky in a Rocky & Bullwinkle short film, which served as her final voice role.

In September 2013, she was honored with the Governors Award at the 65th Primetime Creative Arts Emmy Awards. That same year, she reprised her role as Magica De Spell in the video game DuckTales: Remastered.

== Personal life ==
Foray married Bernard Barondess in 1941. The marriage ended in divorce. She met Hobart Donovan while appearing on The Buster Brown Program on radio. He was the show's main writer and had also written The Buster Brown comic book. Foray and Donovan were married from 1955 until Donovan's death in 1976. She had no children by either marriage.

In 1973, Foray was an organizer of a meat boycott in response to President Nixon's freezing of meat (and other) prices. As a result of this, Foray was included in the master list of Nixon's political opponents, commonly known as Nixon's Enemies List.

=== Death ===
Foray died of a cardiac arrest at a hospital in Los Angeles, California, on July 26, 2017, at the age of 99. She had been in declining health since an automobile accident in 2015.

== Filmography ==
=== Radio ===
Year	Title	Role	Notes
Circa 1937–1939	Lady Make Believe	Host	She also wrote the episodes
1944–1952	The Buster Brown Program	Midnight the Cat, Old Grandie	
1945–1947	Smile Time	Various characters	
1946	Cavalcade of America	Mary Anne Clark	"Danger: Women at Work"
1946	Let George Do It	Mrs. Hutchinson	"Cousin Jeff and the Pigs"
1946; 1948–1950	The Lux Radio Theatre	Additional voices	"Coney Island Repeat" "Mother Wore Tights" "Wabash Avenue"
1947	The Life of Riley	Secretary	"Riley Enrolls at Pip Instead of UCLA"
1947–1950	The Jimmy Durante Show	Various characters	
1948	NBC University Theatre	Cunégonde	"Candide"
1949	Command Performance	The Granny	
1949	Screen Directors Playhouse	Mother Zombie	"The Ghost Breakers"
1950	The Adventures of Philip Marlowe	Stewardess, Receptionist	"The Last Wish"
1952	Amos 'n' Andy	Chiquita	"Leroy's Oil Stock"
1953	Stand by for Crime	Jimmy, the paperboy	"Queenie's 10,000 Dollar Alibi"
1954	Rocky Fortune	Linda, Miss Fabian	"The Museum Murder"
1954	Our Miss Brooks	Mrs. Thundercloud	"Bartering With Chief Thundercloud"
1956–1957	CBS Radio Workshop	Amy Lesley, Convention Secretary, Edwina, Gladys Farley, Grocery Clerk, Listener #2, Rhoda Mae Flogg, Temperamental Actress, Vess Neff	4 episodes
1957	The Stan Freberg Show	Various characters	
1979	Sears Radio Theater	Spanish Lady on the Street	"Voodoo Lady"
2007	Adventures in Odyssey	Madge	"The Other Side of the Glass, Part 1"

=== Film ===
Year	Title	Role	Notes
1943	The Egg Cracker Suite	Oswald the Lucky Rabbit / Cuckoo / Rabbit	Voice role Universal short
1943	The Unbearable Bear	Sleepwalking Wife Bear	Voice role Merrie Melodies short
1946	The Lonesome Stranger	Little Orphan Fanny	Voice role Live action short
1950	Cinderella	Lucifer	
1951	Get Rich Quick	Mrs. Geef, Additional voices	Goofy short
1951	Car of Tomorrow	Fashion Car announcer, Talking Turn Signal	MGM short
1952	Trick or Treat	Witch Hazel	Donald Duck short
1952	Lambert the Sheepish Lion	Mrs. Sheep	
1952	One Cab's Family	Receptionist, Nurse, Mary the Mother Cab	MGM short
1952	How to Be a Detective	The Dame	Goofy short
1953	Little Johnny Jet	Mary	MGM short
1953	Peter Pan	Squaw	She also served as the model for one of the mermaids
1953	Father's Day Off	Goofy Jr.	Goofy short
1953	Father's Week-end	Mrs. Geef	Goofy short
1954	The Farm of Tomorrow	Hen, Female announcer	MGM short
1954	Pet Peeve	Joan	Tom and Jerry short
1955	Mouse for Sale	Joan	Tom and Jerry short
1955	Red Riding Hoodwinked	Red Riding Hood's Grandmother, Red Riding Hood	Sylvester and Tweety short
1955	This Is a Life?	Granny	Bugs Bunny short
1955	A Kiddie's Kitty	Suzanne's Mother	Sylvester short
1955	The First Bad Man	Cavewomen	MGM short
1956	The Flying Sorceress	Joan, Witch	Tom and Jerry short
1956	Broom-Stick Bunny	Witch Hazel	Bugs Bunny short
1956	Tweet and Sour	Granny	Sylvester and Tweety short
1956	Tugboat Granny	Granny	Sylvester and Tweety short
1956	Get Lost	Knothead and Splinter	Woody Woodpecker short
1956	Rocket-bye Baby	Martha Wilbur, Old Lady, P.A. voice	Merrie Melodies short
1956	Deduce, You Say	Alfie's Girlfriend, The Shropshire Slasher's Mother	Daffy Duck short
1957	Red Riding Hoodlum	Knothead and Splinter	Woody Woodpecker short
1957	International Woodpecker	Knothead and Splinter	Woody Woodpecker short
1957	Boston Quackie	Mary	Daffy Duck short uncredited
1957	Mucho Mouse	Joan	Tom and Jerry short
1957	Greedy for Tweety	Granny	Sylvester and Tweety short
1957	Rabbit Romeo	Millicent	Bugs Bunny short uncredited
1957	The Snow Queen	Court Raven, Old robber, Old Fairy	1959 English dub
1957	Tom's Photo Finish	Joan	Tom and Jerry short
1957	The Unbearable Salesman	Knothead and Splinter	Woody Woodpecker short
1958	Don't Axe Me	Elmer Fudd's Wife	Daffy Duck short
1958	Hare-Less Wolf	Charles Wolf's Wife	Bugs Bunny short
1958	A Pizza Tweety Pie	Granny	Sylvester and Tweety short
1958	The Vanishing Duck	Joan	Tom and Jerry short
1958	A Bird in a Bonnet	Granny	Sylvester and Tweety short
1959	Apes of Wrath	Mama Ape	Bugs Bunny short
1959	A Broken Leghorn	Miss Prissy	Foghorn Leghorn short
1959	China Jones	Dragon Lady	Daffy Duck short uncredited
1959	A Witch's Tangled Hare	Witch Hazel	Bugs Bunny short
1959	Loopy De Loop	Red Riding Hood, Grandma	"Wolf Hounded"
1959	Goldimouse and the Three Cats	Narrator, Mother Cat, Goldimouse	uncredited
1960	Trip for Tat	Granny	Sylvester and Tweety short
1961	The Last Hungry Cat	Granny	Sylvester and Tweety short
1962	Quackodile Tears	Daffy Duck's Wife	uncredited
1962	Honey's Money	The Wealthy Widow	Yosemite Sam short
1962	The Jet Cage	Granny	Sylvester and Tweety short
1964	Hawaiian Aye Aye	Granny	Sylvester and Tweety short
1965	Of Feline Bondage	Jerry's Fairy Godmother	Tom and Jerry short
1965	The Year of the Mouse	Second Mouse	Tom and Jerry short
1966	A-Haunting We Will Go	Witch Hazel	Daffy Duck short
1966	The Man Called Flintstone	Tanya	
1967	Congratulations, It's Pink	Baby	Pink Panther short
1970	The Phantom Tollbooth	Faintly Macabre the Witch, Princess of Pure Reason, Voice of Ralph	
1975	Jaws	Michael Brody, Sean Brody	ADR work
1981	The Looney Looney Looney Bugs Bunny Movie	Granny	
1982	Bugs Bunny's 3rd Movie: 1001 Rabbit Tales	Granny / Mother Gorilla / Goldimouse / Mrs. Sylvester / Jack's Mother	Archive footage
1983	Daffy Duck's Fantastic Island	Granny, Miss Prissy, Sylvester's wife	
1983	The Smurfic Games	Jokey Smurf	TV movie
1984	Strong Kids, Safe Kids	Jokey Smurf, Pac-Baby	Video Documentary Short
1985	Molly and the Skywalkerz: Happily Ever After	Ms. Macolla (voice)	Television film for PBS, later, VHS video
1987	Scooby-Doo Meets the Boo Brothers	Poor Old Witch	TV movie
1987	Daws Butler: Voice Magician	Herself	
1987	DTV Monster Hits	Hazel the Witch, Colleen	TV movie
1988	Tex Avery, the King of Cartoons	Herself	TV movie documentary
1988	Who Framed Roger Rabbit	Wheezy, Lena Hyena	
1988	Daffy Duck's Quackbusters		Uncredited
1989	Little Nemo: Adventures in Slumberland	Librarian	1992 English dub
1989	Molly and the Skywalkerz: Two Daddies?	Ms. Macolla (voice)	Television film for PBS, later, VHS video
1990	DuckTales the Movie: Treasure of the Lost Lamp	Mrs. Featherby	
1990	Of Moose and Men: The Rocky & Bullwinkle Story	Herself / Rocky	TV movie
1991	Problem Child 2	Voice of puppet	Live-action film
1992	Adventures in Odyssey: A Fine Feathered Frenzy	Evelynn Harcourt	Video
1992	The Magical World of Chuck Jones	Herself	Documentary
1992	Boris and Natasha: The Movie	Autograph Woman	TV movie
1993	I Yabba-Dabba Do!	Additional voices	TV movie
1994	Thumbelina	Queen Tabitha	
1994	Adventures in Odyssey: Electric Christmas	Evelynn Harcourt	Video
1996	Space Jam	Granny, Witch Hazel	
1998	Mulan	Grandmother Fa	
2000	The Adventures of Rocky and Bullwinkle	Rocky J. Squirrel, Animated Natasha Fatale, The Narrator's Mother	Voice role Live-action/animated film
2000	Tweety's High-Flying Adventure	Granny	Direct-to-video film
2003	Looney Tunes: Back in Action	Granny	Live-action/animated film
2003	Baby Looney Tunes' Eggs-traordinary Adventure	Granny	Video
2003	Looney Tunes: Reality Check	Granny	Video
2003	Looney Tunes: Stranger Than Fiction	Granny / Witch Hazel	Video
2003	Irreverent Imagination: The Golden Age of the Looney Tunes	Herself	Video Documentary
2003–2006	Behind the Tunes	Herself	Video Documentary Shorts: Short Fuse Shootout: The Small Tale of Yosemite Sam / Putty Problems and Canary Rows / Blanc Expressions / A Hunting We Will Go – Chuck Jones' Wabbit Season Twilogy / Wild Lines – The Art of Voice Acting
2004	Mulan II	Grandmother Fa	Direct-to-video film
2006	The Legend of Sasquatch	Momma Sasquach	
2006	Bah, Humduck! A Looney Tunes Christmas	Granny as The Ghost of Christmas Past	Direct-to-video film
2008	Mel Blanc: The Man of a Thousand Voices	Herself	Video Documentary
2008	I Smurf the Smurfs!	Herself / Jokey Smurf	Video Documentary Short
2011	I Tawt I Taw a Puddy Tat	Granny	Theatrical Short
2013	I Know That Voice	Herself	Documentary
2013	The One and Only June Foray	Herself	Documentary
2014	Rocky and Bullwinkle	Rocky, Fearless Leader's Mother	Direct-to-video short; Final role. Planned for Theatrical Release along with Mr. Peabody & Sherman.
2021	Tom & Jerry	Jerry	Archival voice recordings

=== Live action ===
Year	Title	Role	Notes
1954	Sabaka	Marku Ponjoy, The High Priestess of Sabaka	
1954	The Ray Milland Show	Myrna	Episode: "Fashion Model"
1954	Meet Mr. McNutley	Myrna	Episode: "Fashion Model"
1955–1956	The Johnny Carson Show	Various characters	
1957	I Love Lucy	Voice of the Dog	Episode: "Little Ricky Gets a Dog"
1966	Death of a Salesman	Jenny	Television film
1966	Bewitched	Diaper Dan Baby / Baby Gladys Kravitz / Baby Darrin Stephens	2 episodes
1967	Green Acres	Carmelita	Episode: "Don't Count Your Tomatoes Before They're Picked"
1969	The Brady Bunch	Sandra	Episode: "A Clubhouse Is Not a Home"
1969–1970	Get Smart	Impostor 99's 'real' voice / Bus Station Announcer Voice / Doll	3 episodes
1971–1972	Curiosity Shop	Aarthur the Aardvark, Hermione Giraffe, Nostalgia Elephant, additional voices	17 episodes
1974	Little House on the Prairie	Girls Voices in Play	Episode: "Ma's Holiday"
1984	The Duck Factory	Herself	"The Annies"
2000	Great Performances	Herself	Episode: "Chuck Jones: Extremes and In-Betweens – A Life in Animation"

=== Television ===
Year	Title	Role	Notes
1957	The Woody Woodpecker Show	Splinter / Knothead	
1959	The Huckleberry Hound Show	Mom	"Bear on a Picnic" (Yogi Bear segment)
1959–1964	The Rocky and Bullwinkle Show (aggregated title)	Rocky J. Squirrel, Natasha Fatale, Nell Fenwick, Additional Characters	Original titles: "Rocky and His Friends", "The Bullwinkle Show"
1959–1960; 1971–1972	Walt Disney's Wonderful World of Color	Radio Voices, Grandma Duck, Queen, Ma Beagle, Daisy Duck, additional voices	"Duck Flies Coop" "This Is Your Life Donald Duck" "Disney on Parade" "Dad, Can I Borrow the Car"
1959	The Flintstones	Betty Rubble	Flintstones pilot The Flagstones (uncredited)
1960–1961	Mister Magoo	Mother Magoo	
1960–1962	The Bugs Bunny Show	Granny / Witch Hazel	
1961	The Yogi Bear Show		
1961–1962	The Alvin Show	Daisy Bell, Reporter, Additional voices	
1961–1962	Calvin and the Colonel	Woman, Thief, Nancy, Chiquita, Operator	"The Television Job" "Cloakroom" "Calvin's Glamour Girl" "Nephew Newton's Fortune"
1963	Fractured Flickers	Various characters	
1963	Beetle Bailey	Bunny	
1963–1964	The Twilight Zone	Talky Tina, Sport Sharewood	"Living Doll" (uncredited) "The Bewitchin' Pool"
1963–1964	The Flintstones	Grandma Dynamite, Peaches, Nurse #1, Nurse #2, Granny Hatrock, Secretary, Dinosaur #2, Monkey	"Foxy Grandma" "The Dress Rehearsal" "The Bedrock Hillbillies"
1964	The Famous Adventures of Mr. Magoo		
1964	Gilligan's Island	the voice of Alice McNeil on the radio	Season 1 Episode 4: "Goodnight, Sweet Skipper"
1966	The Road Runner Show	Various Characters	
1966	Dr. Seuss' How the Grinch Stole Christmas!	Cindy Lou Who	TV special
1966–1969	The Super 6	Bubbles	
1967	Lost in Space	Gundermar	Voice "The Questing Beast" Uncredited
1967	Birdman and the Galaxy Trio	Medusa	"The Empress of Evil"
1967	George of the Jungle	Ursula, Marigold	
1967–1968	Off to See the Wizard	Dorothy Gale, Wicked Witch of the West	
1968	The Inspector	Edna, Melody Mercurochrome	"Le Ball and Chain Gang", "French Freud"
1968	The Bugs Bunny/Road Runner Hour	various characters	
1968	The Little Drummer Boy	Aaron's Mother	TV special
1968	Mouse on the Mayflower	Ms. Charity Blake, various female pilgrims	TV special
1969	The Pink Panther Show	additional voices	episode: Pinto Pink/Le Pig-al Patrol/In The Pink
1969	Scooby-Doo, Where Are You!	Gypsy Fortune Teller	"A Gaggle of Galloping Ghosts"
1969	The Pogo Special Birthday Special	Pogo, Hepzibah	TV special
1969	Frosty the Snowman	Teacher, Karen, Additional voices	TV short; was replaced by Suzanne Davidson as Karen in later airings and by Greg Thomas as Karen's friends
1969	Here Comes the Grump	The Witch	″Witch Is Witch?″
1969–1970	The Dudley Do-Right Show	Nell Fenwick, Additional voices	TV series
1970	Horton Hears a Who!	Jane Kangaroo, Mother Who, Baby Who, Additional voices	TV short
1972	The New Scooby-Doo Movies	Mrs. Baker	″The Dynamic Scooby-Doo Affair″
1972	The Thanksgiving That Almost Wasn't		TV special
1974	These Are the Days		
1975	The White Seal	Mackah	TV special
1975	Rikki-Tikki-Tavi	Nagaina the Cobra, Teddy's Mom, Darzee's Wife	TV special
1975	Yankee Doodle Cricket	Marsha the Lightning Bug / Queen Bee	TV special
1976	Mowgli's Brothers	Mother Wolf	TV special
1976	The Pink Panther Laugh and a Half Hour and a Half Show	Various Characters	TV special
1976	The Sylvester & Tweety Show	Various Characters	
1977	Bugs Bunny's Easter Special	Granny	TV special
1978	Fabulous Funnies	Broom-Hilda, Oola, Hans, Additional voices	
1978	Bugs Bunny's Howl-oween Special	Witch Hazel	TV short
1978	The Bugs Bunny/Road Runner Show	Various Characters	
1978	Raggedy Ann and Andy in The Great Santa Claus Caper	Raggedy Ann and Comet	TV special
1979	Raggedy Ann and Andy in The Pumpkin Who Couldn't Smile	Raggedy Ann, Aunt Agatha, Neighbor	Credited as Mrs. Hobart Donavan for Aunt Agatha
1979	Bugs Bunny's Looney Christmas Tales	Mrs. Claus, Clyde Bunny	TV special
1979	Bugs Bunny's Valentine Special	Additional voices	TV special
1979	Bugs Bunny's Thanksgiving Diet	Millicent / Attractive Rabbit	TV special
1979	The Bugs Bunny Mother's Day Special	Granny	
1980	Sunshine Porcupine	Honey Bunny, Amp Bamp, Rabbit Robot, Bucky, Bunny 2, Bunny 4	TV Special
1980–1982	Heathcliff	Grandma, Sonja, Crazy Shirley, Iggy, Marcy, Muggsy, Princess	
1981	Faeries	Hag	TV special
1981–1983	Spider-Man and His Amazing Friends	Aunt May Parker, Crime Computer, Judy	
1981	A Chipmunk Christmas	Mrs. Waterford / Mrs. Claus	TV special
1981–1989	The Smurfs	Jokey Smurf, Mother Nature, Additional voices	
1982	The Incredible Hulk	Additional Voices	
1982	My Smurfy Valentine		TV special
1982	The Smurfs Springtime Special	Jokey Smurf / Mother Nature	TV special
1982	The Adventures of Curious George	Narrator	
1982	The Smurfs Christmas Special	Jokey Smurf	TV special
1983–1984	Alvin and the Chipmunks	Additional Voices	
1985	Pound Puppies	Mother Superior, Old Woman	TV special
1985	The Bugs Bunny/Looney Tunes Comedy Hour	Various characters	
1985	A Chipmunk Reunion	Vinny	Uncredited
1985	The Jetsons	Lady at Gas Station, Telephone Operator	"Little Bundle of Trouble"
1985–1991	Disney's Adventures of the Gummi Bears	Grammi Gummi, Dragon, Additional voices	
1986	The Bugs Bunny and Tweety Show	Various characters	
1986–1987	Teen Wolf	Grandma Howard, Mrs. Seslick	
1986–1987	My Little Pony (TV series)	Queen Bumble	
1986–1988	Foofur	Additional voices	
1987	Tis The Season to Be Smurfy	Jokey Smurf	TV special
1987–1988	The Flintstone Kids	Grandma Cavemom	3 episodes
1987–1990	DuckTales	Ma Beagle / Magica De Spell / Mrs. Featherby / additional voices	
1988	Denver, the Last Dinosaur	Bertha	
1988–1989	A Pup Named Scooby-Doo	Constance McSnack / Granny Sweetwater	
1989	Slimer! and the Real Ghostbusters	Mrs. Belle Dweeb	2 episodes
1990	Tom and Jerry Kids Show	Witch	"Doom Manor"
1990	The Simpsons	Happy Little Elf, Rubber Baby Buggy Bumper Babysitting Service Receptionist	"Some Enchanted Evening"
1990–1991	Tiny Toon Adventures	Granny	
1990–1993	Garfield and Friends	Various characters	
1991	Garfield Gets a Life	Mona, Librarian	TV special
1991	Bugs Bunny's Lunar Tunes	Additional voices	TV special
1991	Married... with Children	Voice of Scary Mary	Episode "God's Shoes"
1992	The Plucky Duck Show	Granny	
1993	All-New Dennis the Menace	Martha Wilson	
1993	Rugrats	Blocky, Svetlana the Spy	"Sour Pickles"
1993	2 Stupid Dogs	Red Riding Hood's Grandmother	2 episodes
1993	Bonkers	Ma Barker	"Calling All Cars"
1995	Weird Science	Baby Ruth, Tammy	Voice role Live-action television series
1995	Tiny Toons' Night Ghoulery	Witch Hazel	TV special
1995–2000	The Sylvester & Tweety Mysteries	Granny, Witch Hazel	Annie Award for Outstanding Individual Achievement for Voice Acting by a Female Performer in an Animated Television Production (1996–1997)
1996	Cave Kids	Rat	"Soap Bubble Dreams"
1996	The Bugs n' Daffy Show	Various Characters	
2001	Family Guy	Rocky J. Squirrel	"The Thin White Line"
2002–2006	Baby Looney Tunes	Granny	
2005	The Powerpuff Girls	Madame Argentina	"I See a Funny Cartoon in Your Future"
2005	Duck Dodgers	Lezah the Wicked	"M.M.O.R.P.D."
2009	Random! Cartoons	Mall Walker, Old Man #1, Man at Garbage Can, Woman	2 Episodes
2009	The Marvelous Misadventures of Flapjack	Ruth, Kid, Kelly, Kelly's Mother, K'nuckles' Kindergarten Teacher	"Bubbie's Tummy Ache" "Flapjack Goes to a Party"
2011	The Garfield Show	Mrs. Cauldron, Additional voices	Daytime Emmy Award for Outstanding Performer In An Animated Program (2012)
2011–2014	The Looney Tunes Show	Granny	

=== Video games ===
Year	Title	Role
1997	Lego Island	Mama Brickolini, Polly Gone, Parrot
1998	Rocky and Bullwinkle's Know-It-All Quiz Game	Rocky, Natasha Fatale, Nell Fenwick
1998	Mulan Animated Storybook	Grandmother Fa
1999	Bugs Bunny: Lost in Time	Granny, Witch Hazel
2000	Donald Duck Going Quackers	Magica De Spell
2000	Looney Tunes: Space Race	Granny
2000	Bugs Bunny & Taz: Time Busters	Granny
2003	Looney Tunes: Back in Action	Granny
2007	Looney Tunes: Acme Arsenal	Granny
2008	Disney Think Fast	Magica De Spell
2013	DuckTales: Remastered	Magica De Spell
