= Sabaka =

1955 film

- Film poster
- Directed by: Frank Ferrin
- Written by: Frank Ferrin
- Produced by: Frank Ferrin (producer); Ralph Ferrin (associate producer)
- Starring: Boris Karloff; Nino Marcel; June Foray; Victor Jory; Peter Coe
- Cinematography: Jack McCoskey; Alan Stensvold
- Edited by: John M. Foley
- Music by: V. Dakshinamoorthy
- Distributed by: United Artists
- Release dates: 15 May 1953 (Premiere screening as The Hindu)${ref1}; February 1955 (general release as Sabaka)
- Running time: 77 minutes
- Country: United States
- Language: English

Sabaka (originally to be called Gunga Ram) is a 1953 American adventure film written, directed and co-produced by Frank Ferrin, filmed partially on location in India. The film also starred Victor Jory, Boris Karloff, Peter Coe, Reginald Denny, June Foray and Jay Novello.

The film was about the adventures of an Indian boy named Gunga Ram, played by Nino Marcel. (Ferrin also produced and directed the 1955 television show Andy's Gang, and a number of Gunga Ram's Indian adventures were later broadcast on Andy's show as short subjects. "Gunga Ram" actor Nino Marcel actually appeared live on the show with Andy Devine on two occasions.)

In February, 1953, immediately following the completion of Abbott and Costello Meet Dr. Jekyll and Mr. Hyde, it was announced that Boris Karloff would return to England to star in a Jules Verne movie, but the project was cancelled and Karloff was signed for Sabaka instead. Most of Sabaka was shot in India, but Karloff's and Victor Jory's scenes were all shot in Hollywood.

The film was originally to be titled Gunga Ram, but RKO Pictures complained the title was too similar to their Gunga Din (1939). The picture was briefly renamed The Hindu for its May 15, 1953 premiere screening, and was later again changed to Sabaka just before its general release in February 1955.

== Plot ==
Set in India, Gunga Ram, a young Indian boy, swears vengeance on the members of a religious death cult that murdered his sister Indria and her husband. The killings were ordered by the High Priestess of Sabaka (June Foray) and Ashok (Victor Jory). The Maharajah of Bakore disbelieves him, and when he turns to the Maharajah's General Pollegar (Boris Karloff), he is once again denied justice. Gunga Ram sets out with his two animal companions, a pet tiger and a trained elephant, to destroy the evil cult of Sabaka's fire shrine.

== Cast ==
- Nino Marcel as Gunga Ram
- Boris Karloff as General Pollegar
- Lou Krugman as the Maharajah of Bakore
- Reginald Denny as Sir Cedric
- June Foray as Marku Ponjoy, High Priestess of Sabaka
- Victor Jory as Ashok
- Jay Novello as Damji
- Lisa Howard as Indria
- Peter Coe as Taru
- Paul Marion as Kumar
- Vito Scotti as Rama
- Louis Merrill as Koobah
- Jeanne Bates as Durga
- K. K. Sinha as Fire Dancer

== Taglines ==
- You'll Never Forget the Thundering Feet of 150 Elephants! The Wild-Eyed Terror of a Mad Buffalo Stampede!
- SEE Barefoot Fire-dancers walk thru bed of live coals!
- SEE Nini Marcel, newest screen sensation, fight fear, force and the fire demon!
- India's mightiest dramatic pageant!
