= E.T., I Love You =

1993 album

E.T., I Love You and Other Extra-Terrestrial Songs for Children

Studio album by Starlight Children's Chorus
- Recorded: 1983
- Genre: Children's music, pop
- Length: 25:49
- Label: Kid Stuff

E.T., I Love You and Other Extra-Terrestrial Songs for Children is an album by the group the Starlight Children's Chorus, released in 1983 under Kid Stuff Records. It featured a song "E.T., I Love You" by Buckner & Garcia, which was originally written to accompany the major motion picture E.T. the Extra-Terrestrial.

== Background ==
The song "E.T., I Love You" was originally written by Buckner & Garcia and was recorded and released under Columbia Records in 1982. Appearing on a 7" vinyl as a single, their version of the song was written as a ballad. It was by permission and the liking of Steven Spielberg, intended to be released as a tribute song for the film E.T. the Extra-Terrestrial. But during virtually the same time period, Neil Diamond, another artist under CBS at the time, had recorded his own tribute song which caused a potential conflict for the record label to release and promote two songs on the same subject. Buckner & Garcia's song was held for release until later that year by the label in favor of "Heartlight", although their song remains to be seen as part of the movies' subsequent merchandising craze. It was performed by them on September 25, 1982 at the Georgia Music Festival, prior to receiving an award for Songwriters of the Year by the Atlanta Songwriters Association.

Released under Kid Stuff, a record label devoted entirely to producing music catered for children, "E.T., I Love You" appeared on E.T., I Love You and Other Extra-Terrestrial Songs for Children. It also features six other alien related songs and an overture at the beginning, where a childlike voice with high levels of reverb asks questions like "Where did you come from? Another world?". Overall, the album has been called "freaky";. "So Near and Yet So Far" has been described as up-tempo, comparable to Debbie Gibson, and features the sound effects of robots and a toilet flushing, and "Please Phone Ring-a-Ling" is in the realm of doo-wop style of music. Although being recorded under the group title of "Children's Starlight Chorus", it is not actually sung by any children, but rather an alto female singer attempting to mimic the voice of a young boy. None of the music or any sound clips from the movie appear on the album.

E.T., I Love You and Other Extra-Terrestrial Songs for Children has been described as sounding odd, and off-putting. The album has been noted as being obscure among purveyors of rare music.

=== Unauthorized use of "E.T., I Love You" ===
Nearly two decades later, Mr. Garcia was contacted regarding the version of their song "E.T., I Love You" appearing on the album by the Starlight Children's Chorus. He claimed to have no knowledge of that version. However, in both a 1999 5-song release called Now & Then, and in a 2002 re-release of their chart-topping album, Pac-Man Fever, Buckner & Garcia included their original version.

== Track listing ==
No.	Title	Length
1.	"E.T. Overture"	3:13
2.	"E.T., I Love You"	3:22
3.	"So Near and Yet So Far"	3:26
4.	"Where Did You Come From?"	3:21
5.	"Another World for Me and You"	4:03
6.	"Please Phone Ring-a-Ling"	2:51
7.	"Just Us Two"	2:38
8.	"Come Back Again"	2:51
Total length:		25:49

Information for track listing.

== Sources ==
- McAleer, Dave (1990). The omnibus book of British and American hit singles, 1960-1990. Omnibus Press. p. 224. ISBN 0-7119-2180-6.
- Sellers, John (2001). Arcade fever: the fan's guide to the golden age of video games. Running Press. p. 106. ISBN 0-7624-0937-1.
- Shaw, Russell (October 9, 1982). "Awards Highlight Georgia Fest". Billboard Magazine. Nielsen Business Media, Inc. p. 102. ISSN 0006-2510.
