= Vito Scotti =

American actor (1918–1996)

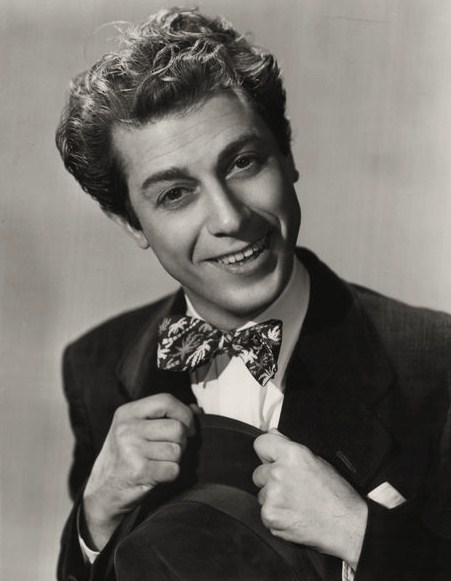
- Scotti in 1953
- Born: Vito Giusto Scozzari; January 26, 1918; San Francisco, California, U.S.
- Died: June 5, 1996 (aged 78); Woodland Hills, California, U.S.
- Resting place: Hollywood Forever Cemetery
- Occupation: Actor
- Years active: 1937–1995
- Spouses: Irene Aida Lopez Scozzari (m. 1949; died 1979); Beverly Scotti ( –1996)
- Children: 2

Vito Giusto Scozzari (January 26, 1918 – June 5, 1996), also known as Vito Scotti, was an American character actor who played both dramatic and comedy roles on Broadway, in films, and later on television, primarily from the late 1930s to the mid-1990s. He was known as a man of a thousand faces for his ability to assume so many divergent roles in more than 200 screen appearances in a career spanning 50 years and for his resourceful portrayals of various ethnic types. Of Italian heritage, he played everything from a Mexican bandit, to a Russian doctor, to a Japanese sailor, to an Indian travel agent.

== Early life and career ==
Vito Giusto Scozzari was born January 26, 1918, in San Francisco, California. He was the son of Giusto and Virginia Ambroselli Scozzari (1889–1982). His father died in Tunis while Vito was still an infant. His family spent the early 1920s in Naples, Italy. The family returned to the United States on July 4, 1924, and lived briefly at 802 South 8th Street in Philadelphia before moving to New York City the following year.

In 1925, his mother became a diva in New York City theater circles and his father an impresario. Scotti worked the night club circuit as a stand-up magician and Mime artist mainly following the Commedia dell'arte style. He made his debut on Broadway in Pinocchio, where he played a small role.

=== Film and television ===
After serving in World War II, Scotti entered movies and television in the late 1940s. He made his film debut with a trio of uncredited roles in 1949.

By 1953, Scotti replaced J. Carrol Naish as Luigi Basco, an Italian immigrant who ran a Chicago antique store, on the television version of the radio show Life with Luigi. Five years later, he portrayed another "ethnic" character, Rama from India (among other characters) in the live-action segment "Gunga Ram" on the Andy Devine children's show, Andy's Gang, where he also played music teacher Pasta Fazooli, a foil to the trickster Froggy the Gremlin. He was cast as French Duclos in the 1959 episode "Deadly Tintype" of the NBC Western series, The Californians.

In 1955, Scotti was reportedly injured while filming with an Elephant named Emma. Emma was reportedly spooked by the faux flora used to dress the set. The elephant shook Scotti and fellow actor Nino Marcel from her back. Scotti suffered a concussion and broken arm. Scotti would work successfully with animals later in his career.

In 1963, Scotti was cast as the Italian farmer Vincenzo Peruggia in the episode "The Tenth Mona Lisa" of the CBS anthology series, General Electric True, hosted by Jack Webb. In the episode set in the year 1911, Peruggia steals the Mona Lisa from the Louvre museum in Paris but is apprehended by a French detective when he attempts to unload the painting on an art dealer.

Scotti also appeared in television series, such as How to Marry a Millionaire (as Jules in the 1958 episode "Loco and the Gambler"), in four episodes of The Rifleman, three episodes of Tales of Wells Fargo, Rescue 8 (1959), State Trooper (1959), Sugarfoot (1959), The Texan (1959), Johnny Staccato (1960), The Twilight Zone ("Mr. Bevis", 1960 and "The Gift", 1962), The Investigators (1961), Target: The Corruptors! (1962), Lassie, Stoney Burke (1963), Wide Country (1963), Dr. Kildare (1963), Going My Way (1963), Breaking Point (1963), The Dick Van Dyke Show (1963), The Addams Family (1964–1965), To Rome with Love and The Andy Griffith Show ("The Gypsies", 1966).

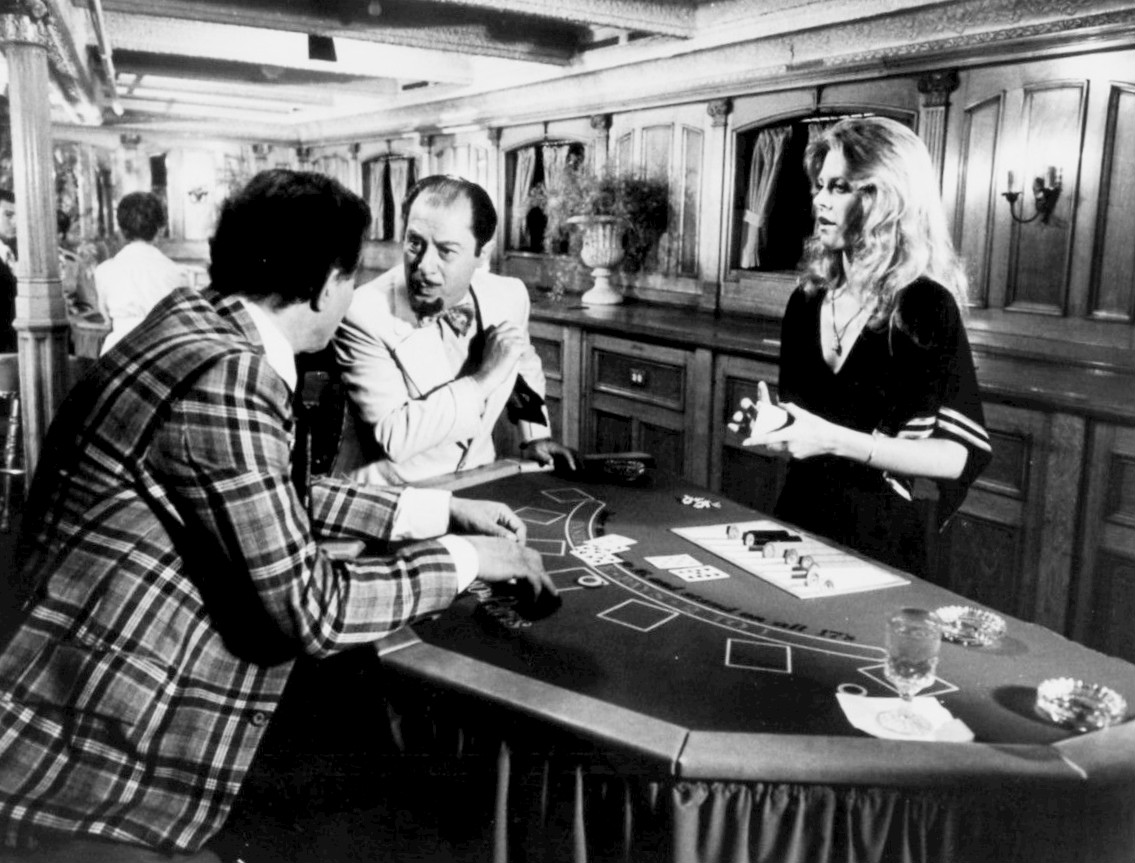
Scotti with Lindsay Wagner (right) from the television series, The Bionic Woman in 1976

Scotti appeared in two episodes of Bonanza, in Gunsmoke (1965–1970), The Man from U.N.C.L.E. (1965 and 1967), The Wild Wild West, Ironside, The Monkees, The Flying Nun, Get Smart, Hogan's Heroes, as one of The Penguin's henchmen in two episodes of Batman, two episodes of The Bionic Woman (1976), and two episodes of The Golden Girls (1988-1989). He played Geppetto in Geppetto's Workshop in the 1980s.

He appeared four times on Gilligan's Island in the 1960s: in season one, episode 15 (1964–65) as a Japanese sailor who did not know World War II was over, later in season one, episode 31, as the same sailor in scenes where Ginger, the skipper, and Mister Howell reflect in diaries on their versions of how a rescue transpired in the above-mentioned episode 15, and twice as Dr. Boris Balinkoff, a mad scientist, in seasons two and three. He appeared in six episodes of Columbo, as a befuddled maître d’, a snobbish clothing store salesman, a soliciting undertaker, an erudite street bum, and a soybean wholesaler, and in one episode as Vito when the series was revived in 1989.

Scotti was cast as a Mexican bandit in two one-hour episodes of Zorro titled "El Bandido" and "Adios El Cuchillo" alongside Gilbert Roland, and an Italian restaurant owner in episode 35 of season one of Bewitched.

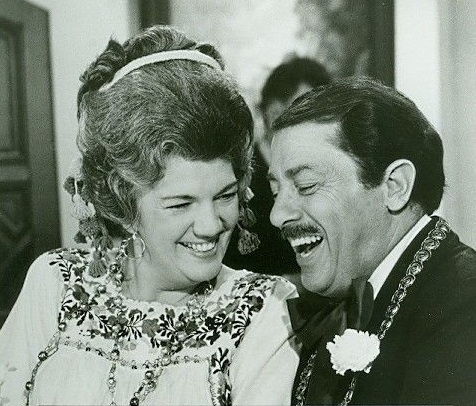
Scotti with Carmen Zapata (left) in Love, American Style in 1973

The actor appeared in many films, including a prominent role as the "Italian Train Engineer" in Von Ryan's Express who leads the escaped prisoners to Switzerland, as Nazorine in The Godfather (1972), as Vittorio in Chu Chu and the Philly Flash (1981), and most notably as the scene-stealing cook in How Sweet It Is! (1968). In the pivotal scene, Scotti grabs a flustered Debbie Reynolds and plants a kiss on her midriff.

Scotti portrayed Colonel Enrico Ferrucci in The Secret War of Harry Frigg (1968) and later appeared in the Academy Award-winning comedy Cactus Flower (1969), as Señor Arturo Sánchez, who unsuccessfully tries to seduce Ingrid Bergman's character.

Scotti voiced the Italian Cat in the Walt Disney animated film The Aristocats (1970), and appeared with Lindsay Wagner on her television special, Another Side of Me (1977). Scotti's last screen performance was as the manager at Vesuvio's in the criminal comedy Get Shorty (1995).

== Death ==
Scotti died of lung cancer at the Motion Picture & Television Country House and Hospital in Woodland Hills, California, on June 5, 1996. He was interred at Hollywood Forever Cemetery, with his first wife Irene, in the Abbey of the Psalms Mausoleum.

== Personal life ==
In addition to his accomplishments as an actor, Scotti was highly regarded as a cook. He loved Italian cooking, especially the recipes of his beloved mother and grandmother. Scotti also enjoyed painting in his spare time.

Scotti was married to former Peruvian Flamenco dancer Irene A. Scozzari from 1949 until her death at age 54 on April 15, 1979. They had two children together; Carmen Antoinette (born 1953) and Ricardo Antonio (born 1956). After Irene's death, Vito married Beverly Scotti. They were together until his death. Scotti was a dedicated fundraiser for the "Carmen Fund", set up by the Joaquin Miller High School Parents Guild, to assist the school's special-needs students. The fund was named after the Scottis’ daughter, one of the first patients to undergo pioneering spinal implant surgery.

== Filmography ==
- Criss Cross (1949) as Track Usher (uncredited)
- Illegal Entry (1949) as Mexican Youth (uncredited)
- East Side, West Side (1949) as Sistina Son (uncredited)
- The Capture (1950) as Truck Driver (uncredited)
- Deported (1950) as Guido's Henchman (uncredited)
- Up Front (1951) as Sergeant Clerk (uncredited)
- Stop That Cab (1951) as Henry (uncredited)
- The Light Touch (1951) as Hotel Clerk (uncredited)
- The Fabulous Senorita (1952) as Esteban Gonzales
- Bal Tabarin (1952) as Police Secretary (uncredited)
- The Miracle of Our Lady of Fatima (1952) as Villager (uncredited)
- Assignment – Paris! (1952) as Italian Reporter (uncredited)
- Shield for Murder (1954) as Joe—Bartender (uncredited)
- Sabaka (1954) as Rama
- Conquest of Space (1955) as Sanella
- The Broken Star (1956) as Pepe (uncredited)
- The Black Orchid (1958) as Paul Gallo (uncredited)
- Party Girl (1958) as Hotel Clerk (uncredited)
- Pay or Die (1960) as Officer Simonetti
- The Facts of Life (1960) as Fishing Boat Driver (uncredited)
- Where the Boys Are (1960) as Maitre D' of The Tropical Isle (uncredited)
- Gold of the Seven Saints (1961) as Gondara's Cook (uncredited)
- Master of the World (1961) as Topage
- The Explosive Generation (1961) as H.S. - Custodian
- Pocketful of Miracles (1961) as Priest (uncredited)
- Saint of Devil's Island (1961) as Louis
- Two Weeks in Another Town (1962) as Assistant Director
- The Courtship of Eddie's Father (1963) as Rick - Flute Player (uncredited)
- Dime with a Halo (1963) as Doorman
- Captain Newman, M.D. (1963) as Maj. Alfredo Fortuno
- Wild and Wonderful (1964) as Andre
- Honeymoon Hotel (1964) as Waiter (uncredited)
- Rio Conchos (1964) as Mexican Bandit
- The Pleasure Seekers (1964) as Neighborhood Man
- Von Ryan's Express (1965) as Italian Train Engineer
- Made in Paris (1966) as Fedya (uncredited)
- Blindfold (1966) as Michaelangelo Vincenti
- What Did You Do in the War, Daddy? (1966) as Frederico
- Warning Shot (1967) as Designer
- The Caper of the Golden Bulls (1967) as François Morel
- The Perils of Pauline (1967) as Frandisi
- The Secret War of Harry Frigg (1968) as Col. Enrico Ferrucci
- How Sweet It Is! (1968) as Cook
- Head (1968) as I. Vitteloni
- Cactus Flower (1969) as Señor Arturo Sánchez
- The Boatniks (1970) as Pepe Galindo
- The Aristocats (1970) as Peppo - Italian Cat (voice)
- The Godfather (1972) as Nazorine
- Napoleon and Samantha (1972) as The Clown
- When the Legends Die (1972) as Meo (Dillon's caretaker)
- The Bull of the West (1972)
- The World's Greatest Athlete (1973) as Games spectator
- How to Seduce a Woman (1974) as Bill
- Herbie Rides Again (1974) as Taxi Driver
- The Wild McCullochs (1975) as Tony, the Bartender
- I Wonder Who's Killing Her Now? (1976) as Col. Guido Ameche
- The Big Bus (1976) as Barber
- Paesano: A Voice in the Night (1977) as Al Lozio
- Zero to Sixty (1978) as Benny
- The One Man Jury (1978) as Poker Player #9
- The Nude Bomb (1980) as Italian Delegate
- Herbie Goes Bananas (1980) as Armando Moccia
- Chu Chu and the Philly Flash (1981) as Vittorio
- CBS Children's Mystery Theatre (1981, episode The Haunting of Harrington House) as Marco Roselli
- Stewardess School (1986) as Carl Stromboli
- Side Roads (1988)
- Beverly Hills Brats (1989) as Jerry
- Loaded Weapon 1 (1993) as Tailor
- Get Shorty (1995) as Manager at Vesuvio's

=== Television ===
- Andy's Gang (1955-1957)
- How to Marry a Millionaire (1958) as Jules
- The Lucy–Desi Comedy Hour (1958) as Shop Owner
- Rescue 8 (1959) as Dal Singh
- Perry Mason (1959) as Joseph D'Amato
- Sugarfoot (1959) as Ramon Acquistapace
- State Trooper (1959) as Reggie Sorbin
- Playhouse 90 (1959) as Cabinet Minister
- Peter Gunn (1959) as Pete's Guest / Herman Klip / Joe
- Wagon Train (1959) as Tony
- Tales of Wells Fargo (1959-1961) as Joe Caboose / Abner Dabler / Mr. Mute
- Johnny Staccato (1960) as Carlos Lascaratti
- Cheyenne (1960 episode "Counterfeit Gun") as Julio
- Zorro (1960) as Chato
- The Real McCoys (1960-1961) as Pablo / Carlos
- Bonanza (1961, 2 episodes) as Pooch / Leon Flores
- The Investigators (1961, episode "A Man of Means")
- Rawhide (1962) as Manuel
- Target: The Corruptors! (1962) as Garcia
- The Twilight Zone (1960-1962) as Rudolpho / Peddler
- Lassie (1962) as Magico the Great
- The Dick Powell Show (1961-1963) as Karam / Dolpho
- Stoney Burke (1963) as Polo
- The Dick Van Dyke Show (1963) as Vito Giotto
- Breaking Point (1963) as Tony
- Going My Way (1963) as Mr. Molletti
- Wide Country (1963) as Carlos Grijalves
- The Rifleman (1962-1963) as Alphonso / Marcello Ciabini / Soto
- The Joey Bishop Show (1963) as Supermarket Manager / Frank the Barber
- My Favorite Martian (1963-1964) as Waiter / Junkyard Manager
- Bob Hope Presents the Chrysler Theatre (1963-1964) as The Lieutenant / Harry
- The Danny Thomas Show (1964) as The Tailor
- The Donna Reed Show (1964) as Prince Georgivani
- Dr. Kildare (1962-1964) as Signore Fortuno / Jesus Munoz / Grocer
- The Jack Benny Program (1961-1965) as Mexican Captain / Mexican cafeteria employee
- Bewitched (1965) as Mario
- Laredo (1965) as Chicho
- The Virginian (1965) as Gilly
- The Addams Family (1964-1965) as Sam Picasso / Professor Altshuler / Miri Haan
- The Farmer's Daughter (1964-1965) as Llewellyn / Ambassador Cortez
- The Andy Griffith Show (1966) as Murrillos (Episode, "The Gypsies")
- The Lucy Show (1962-1966) as Sam Boscovitch / Fencing Instructor
- The Munsters (1965-1966) as Roman Broadcaster / Man on Radio
- The John Forsythe Show (1966) as Gonzales
- Gilligan's Island (1965-1966) as Japanese Sailor / Dr. Boris Balinkoff
- Batman (1966) as Matey Dee
- The Wild Wild West (1966) as Cefalu
- Rango (1967) as El Carnicero (Episode: "Viva Rango")
- The Monkees (1967) as Dr. Marcovich in S1:E17, "The Case of the Missing Monkee"
- The Girl from U.N.C.L.E. (1967) as Dr. Igor Gork
- The Man from U.N.C.L.E. (1965-1967) as Beirut / Charles Chikhli
- Daniel Boone (1967) as Priest
- The Flying Nun (1967-1969) as Capt. Gaspar Fomento / Captain Dominic Lopez
- Hogan's Heroes (1969) as Major Bonacelli
- Ironside (1969) as Manuel Rodriguez Sr.
- Get Smart (1965-1970) as Gino Columbus / Dante
- Gunsmoke (1965-1970) as The Indian / Indiana / Savrin / Torreon
- To Rome with Love (TV series) (1969-1971) as Nico
- Barefoot in the Park (1970) as Victor Velasquez
- The Odd Couple (1971) as Pepe
- The Brady Bunch (1971) as Cooking Show Host (voice, uncredited)
- The Six Million Dollar Man (1973) as 2nd Taxi Driver
- McMillan & Wife (1971-1974) as Sykes / Alonzo / Guido Barteloni
- Get Christie Love! (1974) as Emilio
- Adam-12 (1974) as Charley Prender
- Shaft (1974) Murder One / The Killing
- The Bionic Woman (1976) as Romero
- Monster Squad (1976) as Albert/Alberta
- Police Woman (1977) as Luigi
- C.P.O. Sharkey (1977) as Vito
- Baretta (1977) as Franco
- Happy Days (1979) as Otto
- Charlie's Angels (1980) as Tyrone
- Hawaii Five-O (1980) as Bill Baskin
- Vega$ (1980-1981) as Casino Manager / Valeria Viceria
- Hart to Hart (1981) as Vito
- Madame's Place (1982) as Inspector Putzeau, Episode: "The Stolen Portrait"
- Fantasy Island (1979-1982) as Vito Orsotti / Antoine de Vouvray
- CHiPs (1977-1983) as Charles / Emilio
- Walt Disney's Wonderful World of Color (1975-1983) as Games Spectator / Taxi Driver / Pepe Galindo
- Blood Feud (1983) as Vince Bocca
- Trapper John, M.D. (1984)
- Who's the Boss? (1985 & 1988) as Uncle Aldo Micelli
- Charles in Charge (1988) as Dino Firenzi
- The Golden Girls (1988-1989) as Dominic Bosco / Vincenzo
- Columbo (1973-1989) as Vito / Salvatore Defonte / Thomas Dolan / Mr. Grindell / Chadwick / Maitre d'
- The Fanelli Boys (1990) as Sicilian #1
- Northern Exposure (1992) as Godfather
- Empty Nest (1994) as Mr. Tartaglia
- Mad About You (1995) as Antonio
