= Smilin' Ed McConnell =

American radio personality

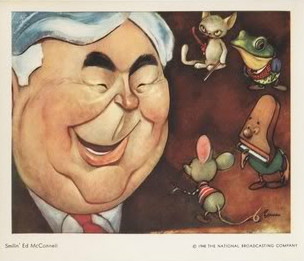
A drawing of Smilin' Ed and the cast of Smilin' Ed's Buster Brown Gang, 1947.

Smilin' Ed McConnell (born James McConnell; 1882 – July 23, 1954) was a radio personality, best known as the host of the children's radio and television series, Smilin' Ed's Gang, closely identified with its sponsor, Buster Brown shoes, and also known as The Buster Brown Program. For his work in radio, McConnell was honored with a star on the Hollywood Walk of Fame.

== Early life ==
Born James McConnell in Atlanta, Georgia, the son of a minister, McConnell began to sing at age three and soon learned how to play drums and the piano. He was athletic as a teenager, and after attending William Jewell College, he became a professional boxer. He enlisted in the United States Army during World War I.

According to an NBC press release, "A troop train on which he was traveling was wrecked in Arkansas by a German sympathizer and Ed wound up in a river. When he was pulled out, an Army surgeon pronounced him dead, but a buddy finally revived Ed with artificial respiration."

== Radio ==
After his discharge from the Army, McConnell was a gospel vocalist with several evangelists. He entered radio in Atlanta in 1922 as a substitute when a scheduled performer failed to arrive. He married in 1928, and four years later joined the CBS network.

In 1937, he moved to NBC as their "Sunshine Melody Man", offering hymns and uplifting messages. McConnell’s blend of "songs, humor and philosophy" aired over network affiliates at 5:30pm. Guests included the Doring Trio, The Four Grenadiers, The Campus Choir and the Rhythmaires.

In 1936, McConnell was featured in Acme Sunshine Melodies on WMAQ in Chicago. The Sunday afternoon program was sponsored by Acme White Lead and Color Works.

McConnell became known in New York City when he was heard over WJZ, though the show was broadcast from Chicago and he lived in Elk Rapids, Michigan. McConnell's time-slot and sponsors also changed. For a while, he was heard at 10:30 am doing a 15-minute program sponsored by the Air Conditioning Training Corporation of Youngstown, Ohio. Variety noted that aside from such hymns as "God Understands," he "unloads a hokey hodgepodge of songs and you-know-me-I wouldn't-steer-you-wrong-blather."

McConnell grabbed children's attention when he created the character Froggy the Gremlin, performing with Irma Allen on the organ or Del Owen on the piano. Even though McConnell became famous as "Smilin' Ed," he continued to host programs for religious adults. While his Buster Brown show was running, McConnell presided over a five-minute show sponsored by the American Poultry Journal. It reached over 50 stations.

Variety said:

"Anyone who's been laboring under the impression that a dash of American folk music and a hymn or two is strictly for farm listeners is apparently off the beam, because here's a series of 48 shorties that two metropolitan stations - Chicago's NBC flagship, WMAQ and Minneapolis' WCCO-CBS have latched on to for a 16 week ride ... Packaged by E. H. Brown Agency for American Poultry Journal, (transcription) disks which feature two songs apiece by Smilin' Ed McConnell, with Irma Glen accompanying on the Hammond, are blanketing the east and midwest now. McConnell plugs the mag ("If you've got a poultry problem, write to APJ's Problem Corner and get a personal reply from the editor...send in a subscription too, only 50 cents for two years!") and sings... Cornfed delivery of a song like "Come Along My Mandy" and hymn "When Cares of Life Distress You" on one platter, cues the general format, but the star of NBC's live "Buster Brown Show" knows how to put over the old "neighborly feeling." And he's no slouch at plugging the Journal, it might be added.

Another Smilin' Ed show was a 15-minute program sponsored by the Purity Baking Company. The Variety review went as follows:

"One of the veterans of radio, Ed McConnell mines the rich veins of American sentiment among those who are white-haired, churchgoing, rural and simple. He has a disarming style that has been analyzed in these columns on previous occasions and for other sponsors. This show differs only that he sticks to hymns and is necessarily serious in comment, with none of the semi-light folksy gab he could more appropriately introduce in a framework not devoted to ecclesiastical music alone. Aiming at a selective audience, the program will no doubt do well. McConnell puts it on a personal basis. Even while telling his listeners this is one program that will not "be cluttered up with long-winded advertising" he is sledge-hammering the important thought - his listeners need to support his sponsors. "My friends who love me will support me by buying Tasty Bread" he announces..."
"McConnell has a good Epworth League baritone and a down home rhetorical sloppiness. It's "you-all" or "ya" and no fuss. In fact, this is about the most calculatedly unpretentious program of the season. McConnell is probably the most humble man in America, making $100,000 or better, a year."

In the early 1930s Smilin' Ed McConnell promoted Aladdin Kerosene Lamps with remarkable success over WLW in Cincinnati, Ohio. He became a well-known radio personality as "The Aladdin Lamp Man", who sang songs, told stories and sold Aladdin lamps over the air.

By 1948, 145 ABC stations were subscribing to his 15-minute programs. Smilin' Ed's humor, songs, and music were condensed into a five-minute program especially for electric lamp dealers. So it is very likely that this series originated after 1948.

=== The Buster Brown Show ===
For The Buster Brown Show, Ed had support from producer Frank Ferrin, writer Hobart Donavan (who also wrote the Buster Brown comic book giveaways) and director Arthur Jacobson. When Ed started this show, some radio listeners recalled Buster Brown faintly from a 1929 DBS radio series. By the time Smilin' Ed got his kiddie show, Buster Brown was no longer well remembered as a comic strip because the character was merely the trademark symbol for a shoe company.

Buster Brown and Smilin' Ed were joined in 1944, with "Smilin' Ed's Buster Brown Gang" taking to the airwaves on September 2. The show continued on NBC radio every Saturday morning at 11:30 through April 11, 1953. There was an adventure story to open the show, plugs for Buster Brown shoes, and Froggy the Gremlin might sing a song or annoy a guest, such as Shortfellow the Poet or Alkali Pete the Cowboy.

The character "Midnight the Cat" actually spoke a few lines on the show and Smilin' Ed was always prone to sing a novelty song or two by plunking his magic twanger. The term "plunking" may have come from McConnell's habit of plunking the strings on his piano to emphasize some of the action in his stories. McConnell was the voice of Froggy, putting on a low, gruff, Popeye-like croak.

However, whenever McConnell had to sing a duet with Froggy, announcer Archie Presby was the voice of Froggy. And when there was a live audience, Archie would sometimes dress up in a frog costume and carry on to the delight of the screaming kids. The cast included June Foray and John Dehner. The cast took part in the adventure stories. Foray was called upon to voice "Midnight" and "Old Grandie the Piano", and Bud Tollefson, the sound effects engineer, growled the voice of "Tige the Dog." Child actor Patrick Curtis (Baby Beau Wilkes in "Gone With The Wind") played Buster Brown in 1949-50. "That's my dog Tige, he lives in a shoe, I'm Buster Brown, look for me in there too!"

Smilin' Ed used the show to promote not only the Buster Brown shoes but also the comic books, which featured McConnell and usually a little story involving the "Buster Brown Gang" of Midnight, Squeaky and Froggy.

== Television ==
Smilin' Ed MConnell and His Buster Brown Gang debuted on NBC on August 26, 1950 and ran through May 1951. From August 1951 to April 1953, the show moved to CBS, and it then moved to ABC from August 1953 to April 23, 1955.

== Death ==
Smilin' Ed McConnell died on July 23, 1954, at Newport Beach, California, as a result of a heart attack.

== Tribute ==
- Buckner & Garcia paid homage to these characters on a 1982 novelty song about the arcade game Frogger called "Froggy's Lament" from their album Pac-Man Fever with its lyrics "Hiya kids" and "Plunk your magic twanger, Froggy!".

== Listen to ==
- Aircheck of Smilin' Ed McConnell singing "Aladdin Lamp Man" jingle
