= Buster Brown suit =

Historical children's clothing

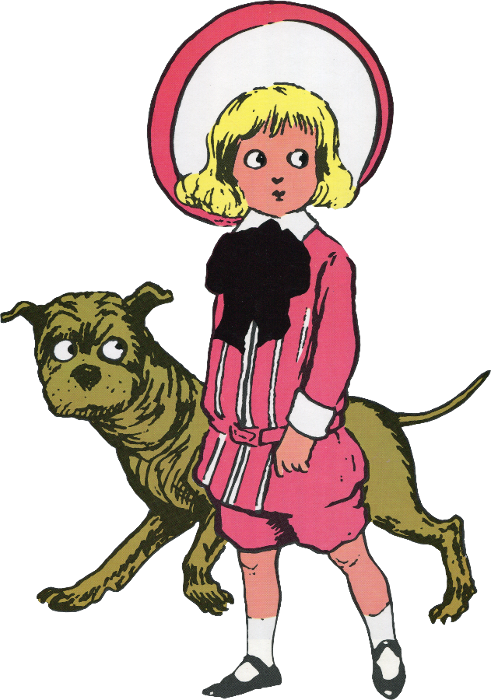
The comic strip character Buster Brown, wearing the outfit that took his name

A Buster Brown suit was a very popular style of clothing for young boys in the United States during the early 20th century. It was named after the comic strip character Buster Brown, created in 1902 by Richard Felton Outcault.

It typically consisted of a belted, double-breasted tunic or jacket worn with a large round collar, floppy bow, and shorts or knickerbockers. It was often worn with a round straw hat and a haircut with bangs. Along with the sailor suit, the Eton suit, the Norfolk suit and the Fauntleroy suit, the Buster Brown suit is cited as one of the key looks in boys' clothing of the period.

== Background ==
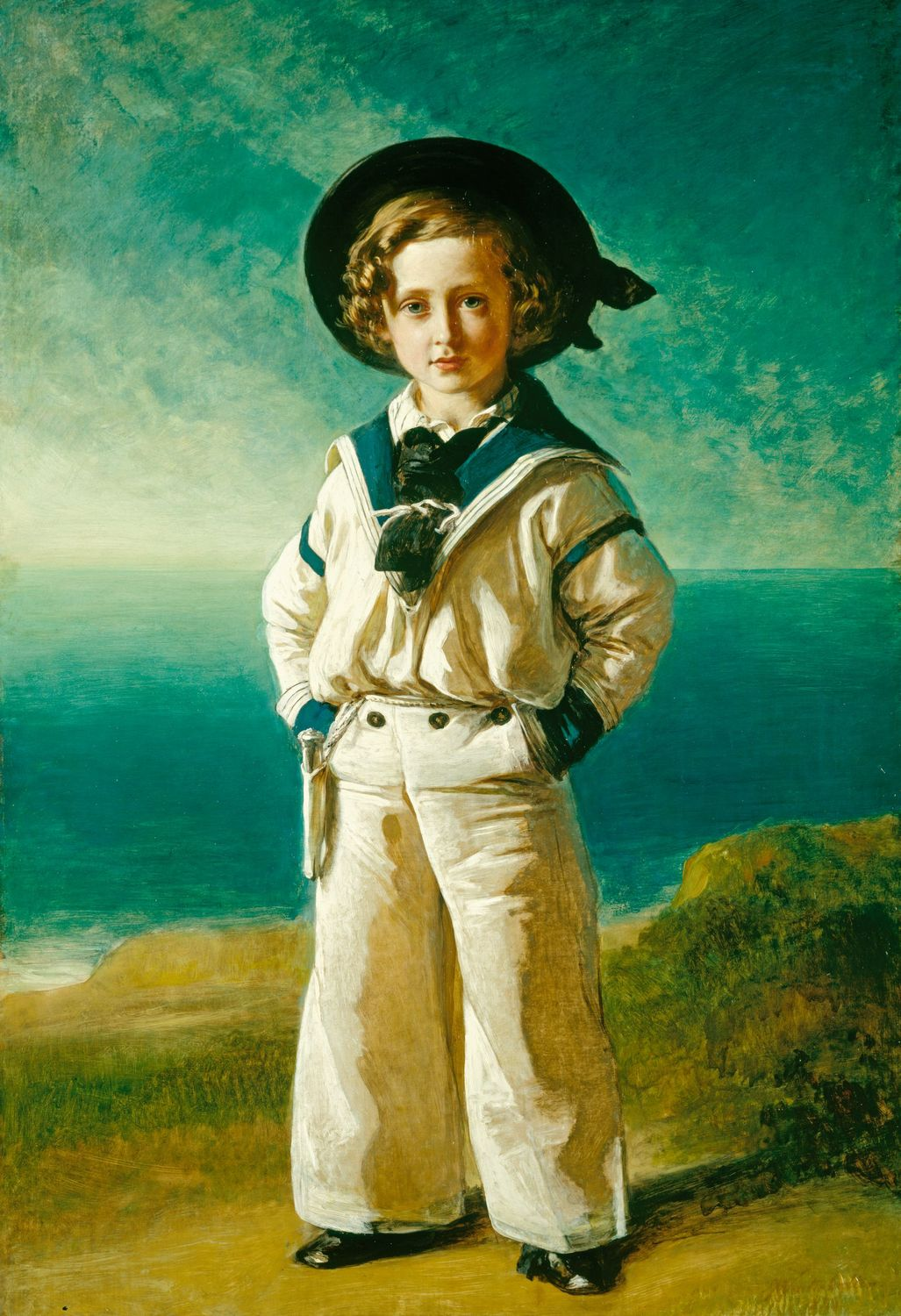
Portrait of Edward, Prince of Wales by Franz Xaver Winterhalter, 1846

Outcault got the idea for this suit from Prince Edward (later King Edward VII). As a child, Edward's mother, Queen Victoria, had him dressed in suits that looked like sailor suits that the British Royal Navy would wear. It was common in the 19th century for royal children to wear clothes similar to those of the military because it showed off their future roles of power and was also a sign of respect and loyalty to their country. On a visit to Ireland, Edward wore a sailor suit and had his portrait painted by Franz Xavier Winterhalter, the court artist. After the painting was done, copies were made as steel engravings for public sale. This is what launched the suits into becoming more popular and a greater symbol of class and power.

The comic book character Buster Brown had very wealthy parents, so drawing him dressed up in a sailor suit was a symbol of his wealth and also a symbol of class, alluding to royalty and power. Knowing that sailor suits had this reputation and background explains why mothers chose to dress their sons in them, especially if they were trying to hide the fact that they were poor.

== Usage ==
The suit was often chosen by mothers for their sons against their children's wishes. It was perceived by mothers as a symbol of neatness and gentility but could lead to its wearer being mocked by other children and called a "sissy".

Mark Rothko, who arrived in the United States as a child immigrant with his family in 1913, was deliberately dressed in a Buster Brown suit made in Daugavpils to camouflage both the family's poverty and their Russian-Jewish origins. The Buster Brown suit was also occasionally worn by older boys and men, such as the teenaged Eugene Bullard, a fan of the comic strip, who in the late 1900s purchased a Buster Brown suit with knickerbockers for Sunday best.

== See also ==
- Collar (clothing)
