= Pac-Man Fever (song) =

1981 single by Buckner & Garcia

- A-side label of U.S. vinyl single

Single by Buckner & Garcia

from the album Pac-Man Fever
- B-side: "Pac-Man Fever" (Instrumental)
- Released: December 1981
- Recorded: 1981
- Genre: Pop rock; novelty
- Length: 3:48; 5:51 (extended 12-inch version)
- Label: Columbia/CBS; 18-02673 (7-inch single); 44-02762 (12-inch single)
- Songwriters: Jerry Buckner; Gary Garcia
- Producers: Buckner & Garcia

"Pac-Man Fever" is a 1981 novelty song by Buckner & Garcia. Capitalizing on the video game craze of the early 1980s, the song, referencing the arcade game Pac-Man, peaked at number 9 on the Billboard Hot 100 in the United States in March 1982.

That same month, it was certified Gold by the Recording Industry Association of America for over one million units shipped to retailers; the single sold 1.2 million copies by the end of 1982, and 2.5 million copies in total as of 2008. VH1 ranked it at number 98 on their list of 100 Greatest One Hit Wonders of the 80s.

A follow-up release in May 1982, "Do the Donkey Kong" (another novelty song referencing Nintendo's Donkey Kong) just missed the Billboard chart, ranking number 103.

== Composition ==
Sheet music for the song shows common time with a moderate tempo of 138 beats per minute, in the key of F major.

== Background ==
Buckner and Garcia were in the Atlanta area in 1981, recording TV jingles and other low-profile studio work. They were eating at a restaurant down the road in Marietta, and they saw other diners swarming around a brand new Pac-Man machine. The duo had never heard of the game before, but they waited their turn and played it too, and ended up playing for two hours straight. After that, they decided to write a novelty song about the game. Their manager shopped the song at radio stations nationwide, but no one wanted to play it. However, when they shopped it locally, 94Q (WQXI-FM) in Atlanta decided to play it for fun on their show one morning. The station was bombarded with calls from listeners who begged to hear it again and again. This got the attention of CBS Records as well as other stations across the country, and the single hit #9 on the US Billboard charts in 1982.

== Chart performance ==
=== Weekly charts ===
Chart (1982)	Peak position
Canada RPM Top Singles	9
US Billboard Hot 100	9
U.S. Cashbox Top 100	7

=== Year-end charts ===
Chart (1982)	Rank
US Top Pop Singles (Billboard)	42
US Cash Box Top 100	47
US American Top 40	58
Canada	92

== Certifications ==
Region	Certification	Certified units/sales
United States (RIAA)	Gold	1,000,000^{^}
^{^} Shipments figures based on certification alone.

== Re-recorded album ==
In 1998, the duo was asked to record an unplugged version of "Pac-Man Fever" exclusively for the syndicated radio show Retro Rewind. In 1999, a re-recorded version of the album was released independently by Buckner and Garcia, which was released commercially through K-Tel in 2002. However, Buckner and Garcia could not obtain the original master recordings from Sony Music Entertainment, so the duo was forced to record new performances of the songs and recreate a lot of the sound effects either digitally or musically.

In honor of the release of the 2015 film Pixels, Jerry Buckner, and Danny Jones with Jace Hall, took the vocals from Gary Garcia's master recording, and created a new version called "Pac-Man Fever Eat Em' Up".

== Appearances in media ==
This song was referenced in The Simpsons episode "A Tale of Two Springfields".

This song was additionally featured in the South Park episode "Splatty Tomato" as well as the Family Guy episode "The D in Apartment 23", both aired in 2017.

This song was also featured in the video game Lollipop Chainsaw, released for PlayStation 3 and Xbox 360.

== Related song ==
"Weird Al" Yankovic recorded a similar song in late 1981 called "Pac-Man", during the height of the game's popularity. It is based on The Beatles' song "Taxman". The song was released on the compilations Dr. Demento's Basement Tapes No. 4 and Squeeze Box: The Complete Works of "Weird Al" Yankovic.
