= Pac-Man Fever (album) =

- Cover illustration of 1999 re-release

Studio album by Buckner & Garcia
- Released: January 1982
- Recorded: 1981
- Genre: Rock, novelty, new wave
- Length: 33:24
- Label: Columbia/CBS Records (1982); RC 37941; Buckner & Garcia Productions (1999); K-tel Entertainment (2002 version)
- Producer: Buckner & Garcia

Buckner & Garcia chronology
Pac-Man Fever (1982)	Now & Then (1999)

Professional ratings
Review scores
Source	Rating
AllMusic	3/5 stars

Pac-Man Fever is a 1982 album recorded by Buckner & Garcia. Each song on the album is about a different arcade game and uses sound effects from that game. The album was originally released on LP, cassette, and 8-track tape in January 1982, and was later completely re-recorded for re-release on CD in 1999 and 2002.

The title song, "Pac-Man Fever", was released as a single in December 1981 and became a top 10 hit, peaking at #9 in March 1982 on the Billboard Hot 100 and earning gold certification by the RIAA for selling over one million copies; the single sold 2.5 million copies in total as of 2008. It was released independently earlier in the year on the BGO Records label before being picked up by Columbia/CBS. The album's second single, "Do the Donkey Kong", peaked at #3 on the Bubbling Under Hot 100 chart. Like the title track, the album went on to receive a gold certification from the RIAA, for over 500,000 records sold; the album had sold 1,200,000 copies in total by the end of 1982. The duo performed both of these singles on American Bandstand on March 20, 1982, and appeared later that day on Solid Gold to perform the title track.

The album was completely rerecorded in 1999 for CD release because the original album is still owned by Sony Music Entertainment, which declined to re-release it.

== Track listing ==
No.	Title	Game	Length
1.	"Pac-Man Fever"	Pac-Man	3:48
2.	"Froggy's Lament"	Frogger	3:18
3.	"Ode to a Centipede"	Centipede	5:37
4.	"Do the Donkey Kong"	Donkey Kong	4:24
5.	"Hyperspace"	Asteroids	4:07
6.	"The Defender"	Defender	4:02
7.	"Mousetrap"	Mouse Trap	4:01
8.	"Goin' Berzerk"	Berzerk	4:17

== Personnel ==
- Gary Garcia: vocals, keyboards, synthesizers, cowbell
- Jerry Buckner: vocals, keyboards, synthesizers
- Mike Stewart: Moog synthesizer (7, 8)
- Chris Bowman, Rick Hinkle: electric guitar
- Larry McDonald: bass guitar
- Ginny Whitaker: drums, percussion
- David "Cozy" Cole: electronic drums

"Froggy's Lament" also pays tribute to Smilin' Ed McConnell and Froggy the Gremlin from Andy's Gang with its lyrics "Hiya, kids" and "Plunk your magic twanger, Froggy!"
