= Buster Brown =

20th century U.S. cartoon character, shoe mascot, and suit prototype

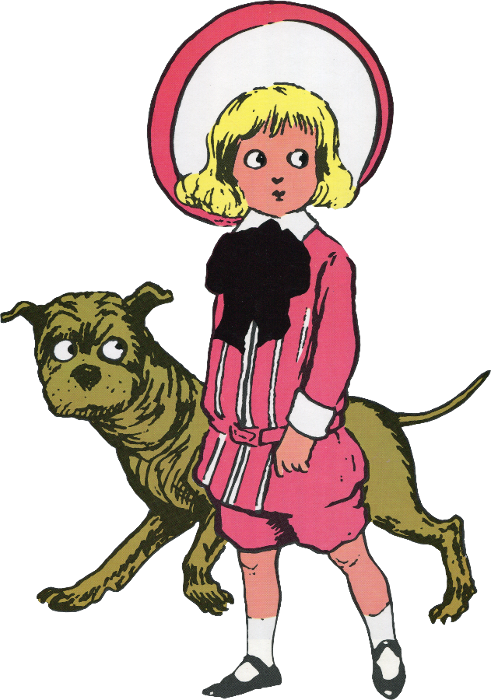
- Buster Brown accompanied by his pitbull, Tige.

Publication information
- Publisher: New York Herald
- First appearance: May 4, 1902
- Created by: Richard F. Outcault

In-story information
- Team affiliations: Mary Jane, Tige

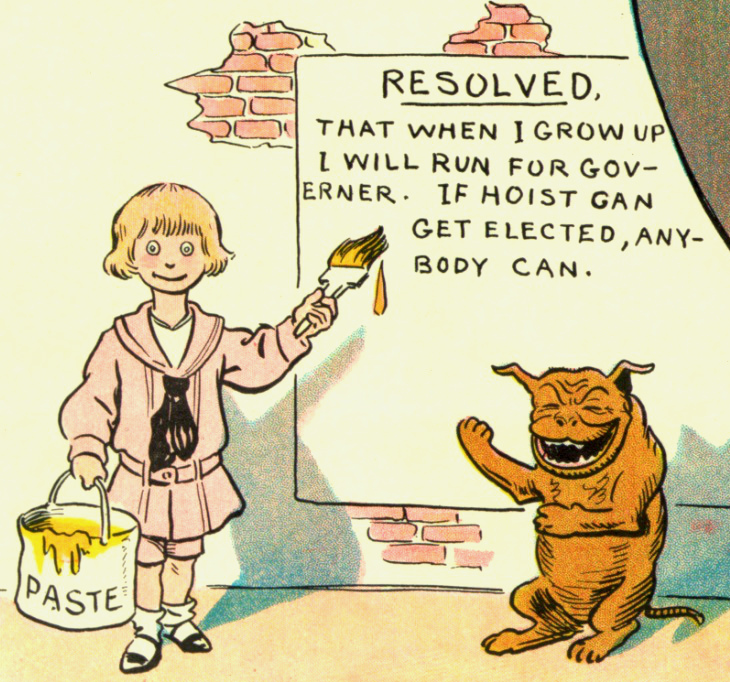
Buster and Tige, cropped from a 1906 political cartoon ("Hoist" refers to William Randolph Hearst in rustic New York accent.)

Buster Brown is a comic strip character created in 1902 by Richard F. Outcault that was adopted as the mascot of the Brown Shoe Company in 1904. The characters of Buster Brown, Mary Jane, and his dog Tige became well known to the American public in the early 20th century. The Buster Brown suit reflected his outfit and became very popular for young boys.

== Origin ==
The character of Buster Brown may have been loosely based on Granville Hamilton Fisher, a son of Charles and Anna Fisher of Flushing, New York. Outcault copied Fisher's physical appearance for his comic strip. The name "Buster" came from the popularity of Buster Keaton, then a child actor in vaudeville. Roger Cushman Clark (1899–1995) of Deadwood, South Dakota was also described as the "original model" for the Buster Brown character.

== Publication history ==
Buster Brown
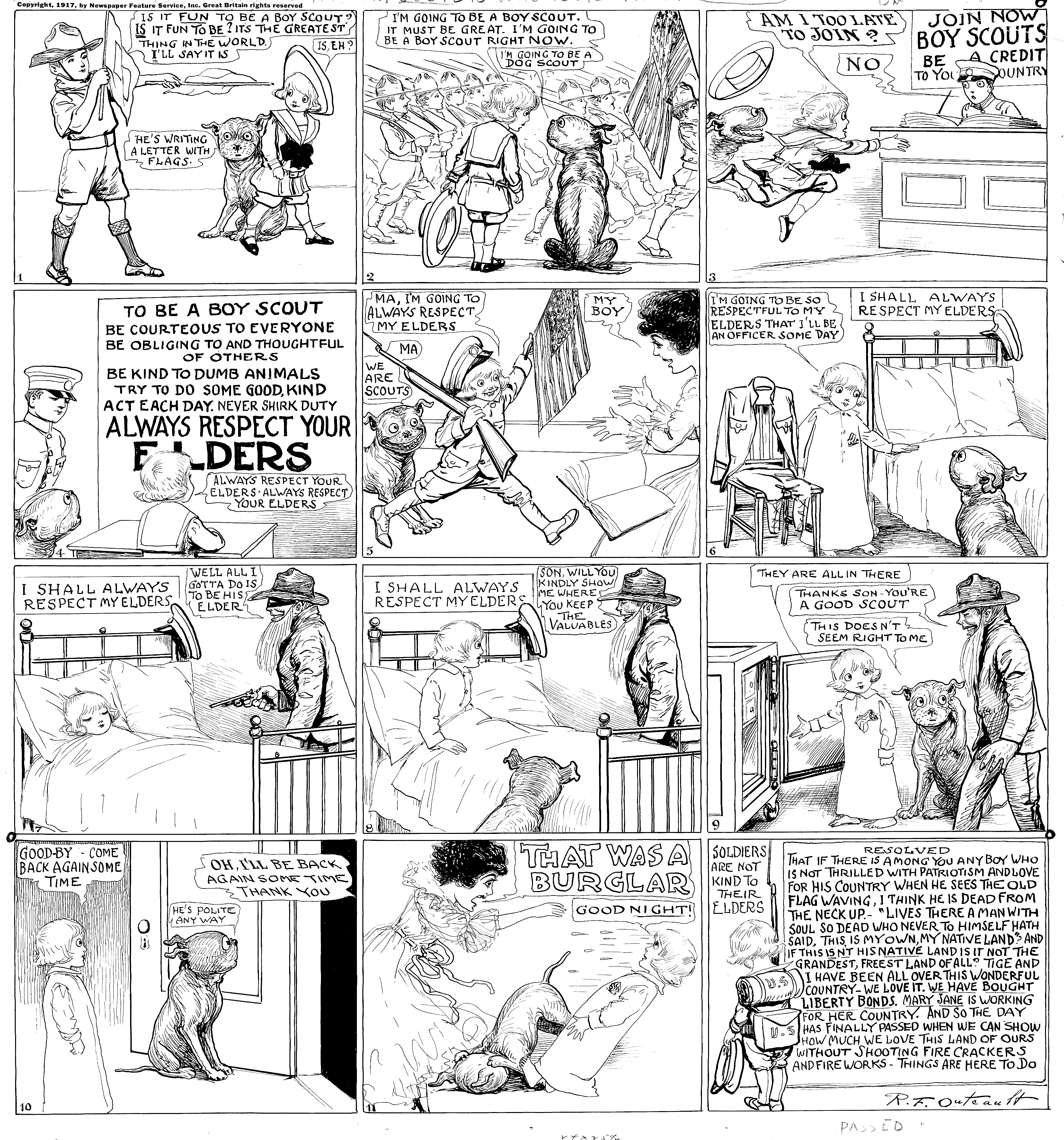
- Richard F. Outcault's Buster Brown (1917)
- Author: Richard F. Outcault
- Current status/schedule: Concluded
- Launch date: May 4, 1902
- End date: c. 1921
- Syndicate(s): New York Herald (1902–1906); Hearst Corporation (1906–c. 1921)
- Genre: humor

The comic strip began in the New York Herald on May 4, 1902. Outcault left to work for William Randolph Hearst in January 1906. He continued to produce the comic strip in Hearst's newspapers after a court battle which left it nameless, while the Herald continued their own version of Buster Brown with other artists. The Herald version lasted until January 1911, and Outcault's version until May 13, 1923.

The series was translated into Portuguese and published in the Brazilian children's magazine O Tico-Tico where Buster Brown was known as Chiquinho.

== Characters and story ==
=== Buster Brown ===
Buster Brown is a young city-dwelling boy with wealthy parents. He is disturbingly pretty (contrast him to Outcault's own The Yellow Kid, or Frederick Opper's creations), but his actions belie his looks. He is a practical joker who might dress in a girl's outfit and have her wear his clothes, break a window with his slingshot, or play a prank on a neighbor. The trick or transgression is discovered, and he is punished, usually by being spanked by his mother, but it is unclear if he ever repents. Many strips end with Buster delivering a self-justifying moral that has little or nothing to do with his crime. For example, a strip from May 31, 1903, shows him giving Tige a soda from a drugstore soda fountain. The drink splashes, not only the front of his own clothes, but the skirts of a woman's splendid dress. Horrified by his clumsy misadventure, Buster's mother takes him home and flogs him with a brush. In the last panel the boy has written a message beginning, "Resolved! That druggists are legalized robbers; they sell you soda and candy to make you ill, then they sell you medicine to make you worse."

=== Mary Jane ===
Mary Jane is Buster's girlfriend. She is based on R. F. Outcault's daughter of the same name. Her parents are never mentioned, though at many of the comic headers there are letters addressed to her from her mother. She has curly black hair and brown eyes. She usually wears a blue, frilly dress, a large bow, and Mary Jane shoes with black stockings.

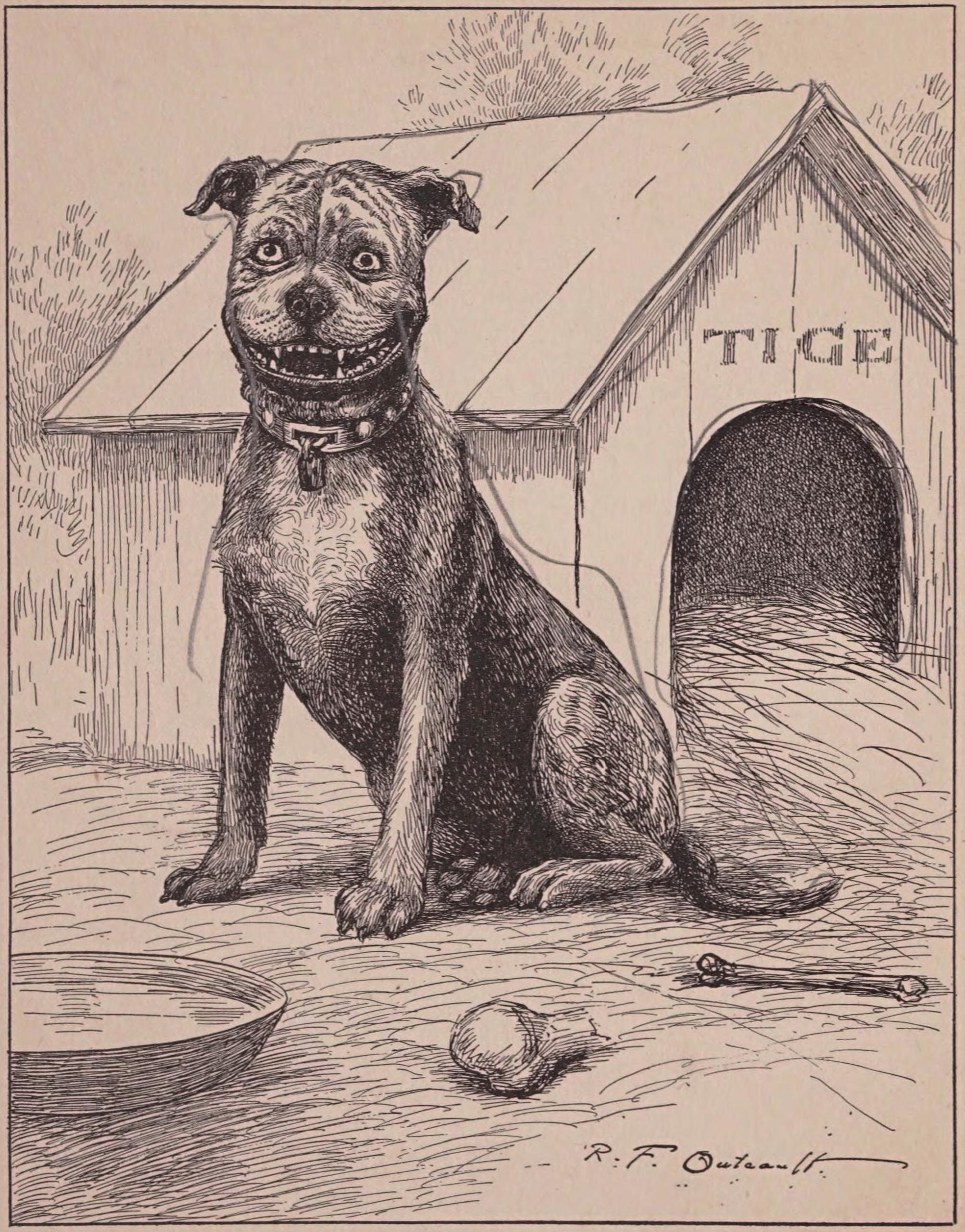
Tige from the 1905 book, "Tige" His Story

=== Tige ===
Tige is thought to be the first talking pet to appear in the comics. Unlike the characters presented under this trope, Tige's speech is acknowledged by adults, and many are shocked by this. This popular character was the subject of a book in 1905 with the title, "Tige" His Story.

== Brown Shoe Company mascot ==
Outcault traveled to the 1904 St. Louis World's Fair, selling licenses to up to 200 companies to use the Buster Brown characters to advertise their products. Buster Brown's association with shoes began with John Bush, a sales executive with the Brown Shoe Company; he persuaded his company to purchase rights to the Buster Brown name, and the brand was introduced to the public at the 1904 World's Fair.

Midgets were hired by the Brown Shoe Co. to play Buster in tours around the United States. These actors, each accompanied by a dog, performed in department stores, theaters and shoe stores from 1904 until 1930. Richard Barker played Buster Brown in many of these Brown Shoe Company advertising campaigns; his story is told in a biography called Buster Brown and the Cowboy.

In the 1940s and '50s, the Brown Shoe Company made a foray into the comic book publishing industry with Buster Brown Comics, on which a retailer could rubber-stamp their address. The comics featured the characters on the cover, but contained different adventure features, such as Robin Hood.

The characters were revived with an updated, more contemporary look for a brief advertising campaign in the 1980s and 1990s.

== In other media ==
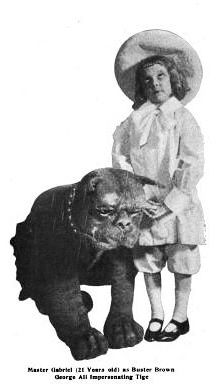
21-year-old dwarf actor "Master Gabriel" plays the title role of Buster Brown, with George Ali as Tige, in the 1905 Broadway production.

=== Comic books ===
Buster Brown comics were given away as premiums in shoe stores from 1945 to 1959. Some contain art by Reed Crandall and other notable cartoonists. In the 1950s other comics based on the radio show were produced by Custom Comics and Dell Comics, and a coloring book was also produced.

=== Film ===
A series of live-action two-reelers were produced from 1925 to 1929 by the Stern Bros. for Universal Pictures. Buster was played by the actor Arthur Trimble. Pal the Wonder Dog (who played Tige) and director Gus Meins were both later associated with the popular Our Gang (Little Rascals) comedies, where Pal at some point came to be known as Pete the Pup, a name inherited by one of his pups, who carried on the role after Pal died of poisoning in 1930.

=== Theater ===
In 1905, a play was performed on Broadway at the Majestic titled Buster Brown. It starred a 21-year-old adult dwarf actor named Master Gabriel (1882–1929), born Gabriel Weigel. Photos of Master Gabriel in the role show him very convincing as a child. Gabriel appeared in another children's-oriented play in 1908 Little Nemo and a return engagement as Buster Brown in 1913. It also featured famous animal actor George Ali as Tige.

=== Radio ===
A Buster Brown radio series began in 1943 with Smilin' Ed McConnell on the West Coast NBC Radio Network. It included such characters as Froggy the Gremlin ("Plunk your magic twanger, Froggy!") and Midnight the Cat ("What do you say to the kids, Midnight?" "Nice.") Their jingle: "I've got shoes. You've got shoes. Everybody's got'a have shoes. And what's the best kind of shoes for me? Good ol' Buster Brown shoes!"

=== Television ===
McConnell moved the show to television in 1950, where it ran under the titles Smilin' Ed's Gang and The Buster Brown Show for four years. Andy Devine took over in 1955 after McConnell's death, but Devine's show was titled Andy's Gang.

=== Playground games ===
Buster Brown makes an appearance in several children's playground games. There is a skipping rope rhyme that starts "Buster Brown | Went to town | With his pants | On upside down." There is also a game played on a seesaw where one rider will stop the seesaw with the other rider in the air and chant, "Buster, Buster, Buster Brown, what will you give me if I let you down?" The rider stuck in the air then offers an imaginary payment of grandiose proportions (e.g., "every Barbie doll ever", "the Moon and all the stars").

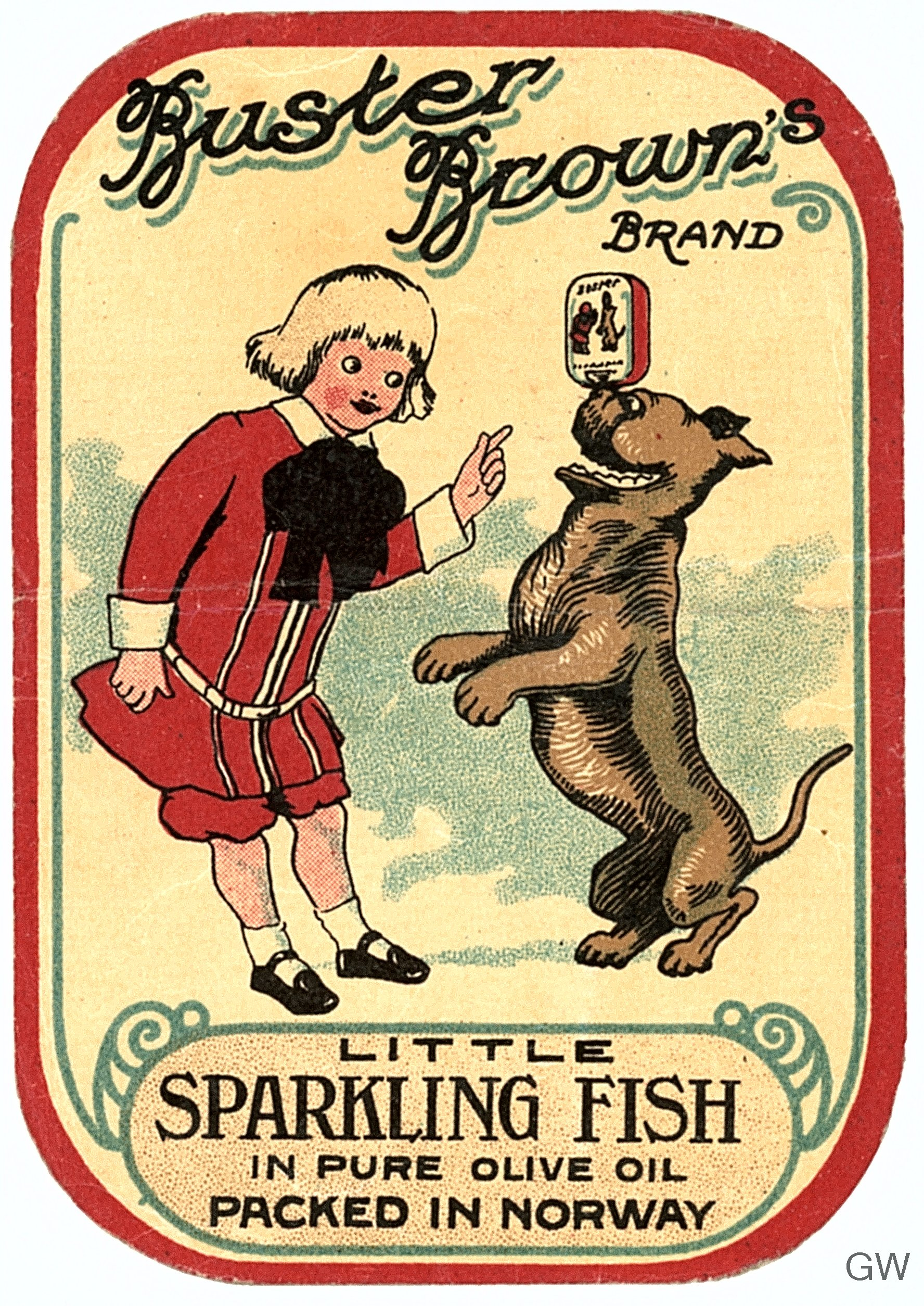

== Gallery ==
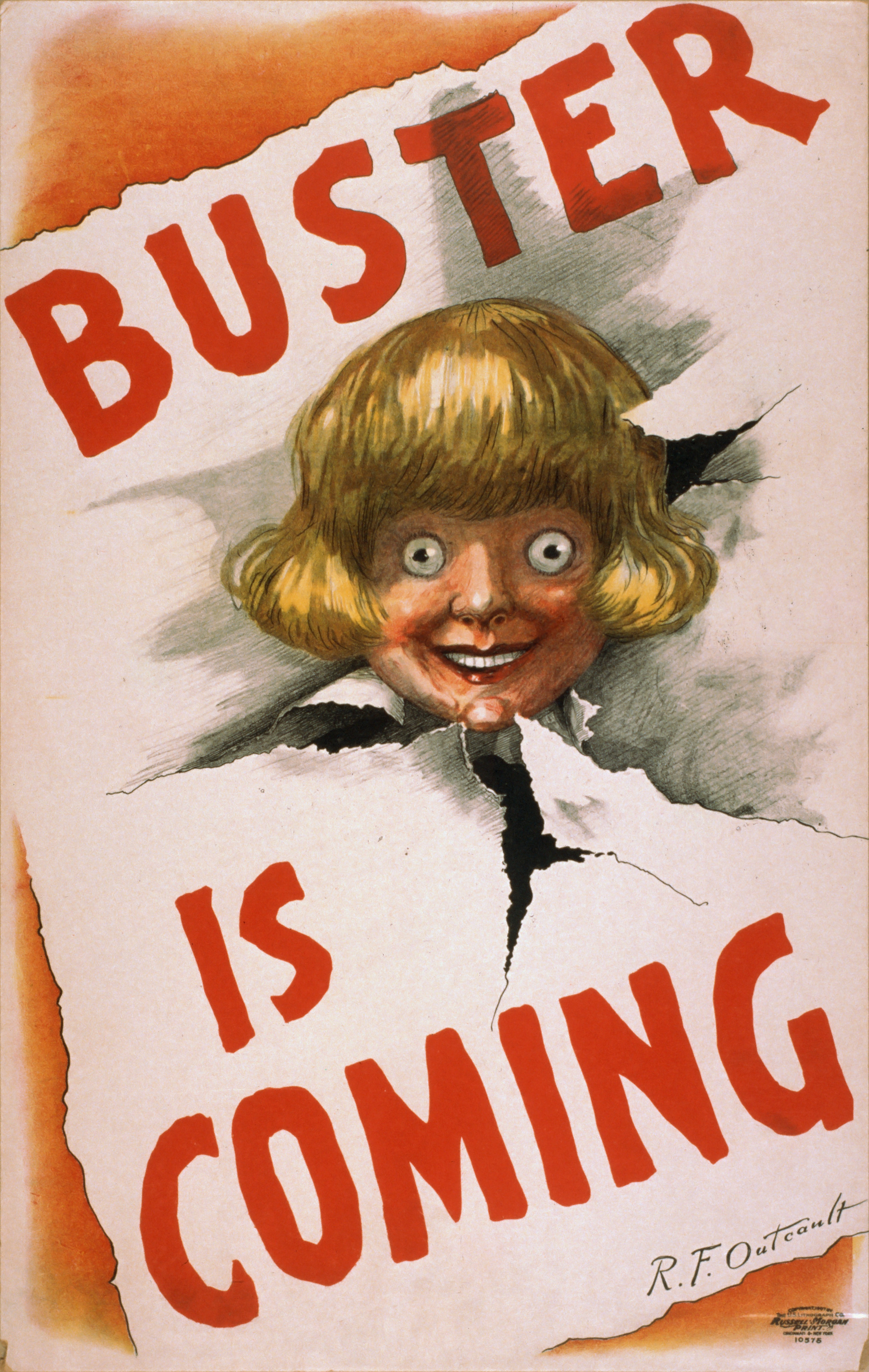

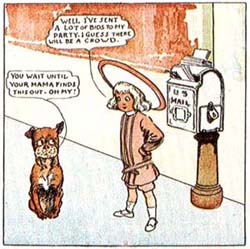

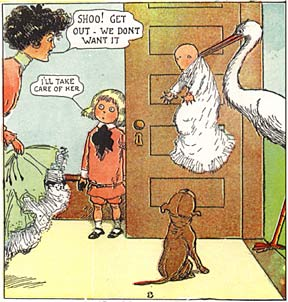

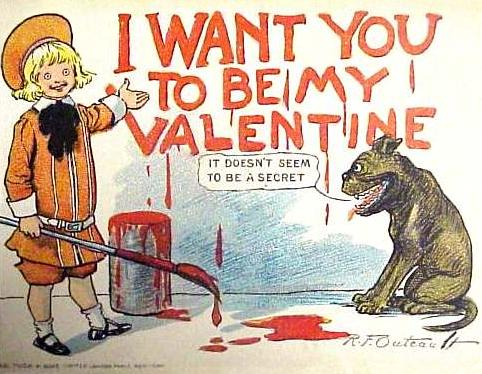

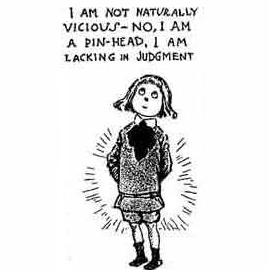

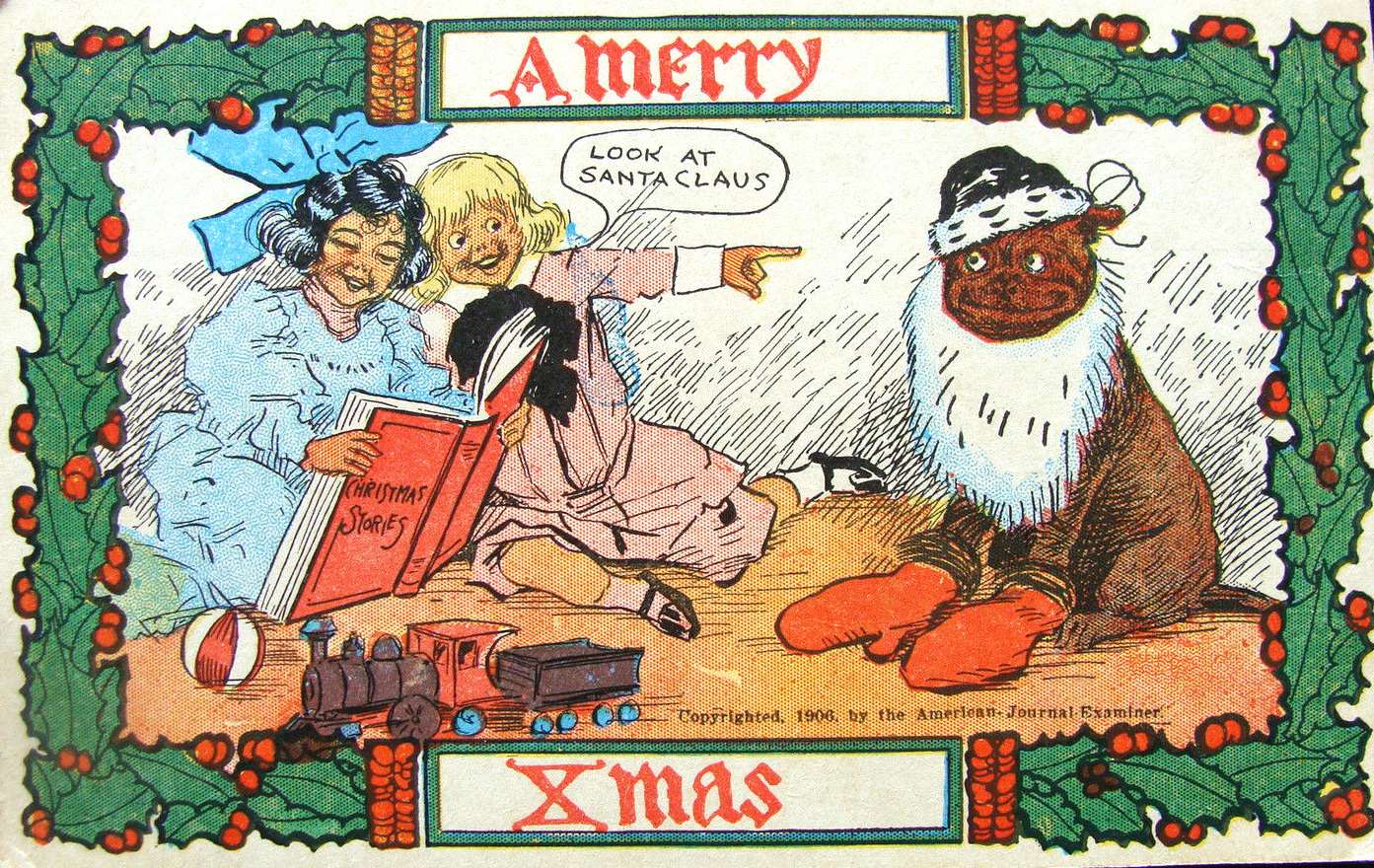

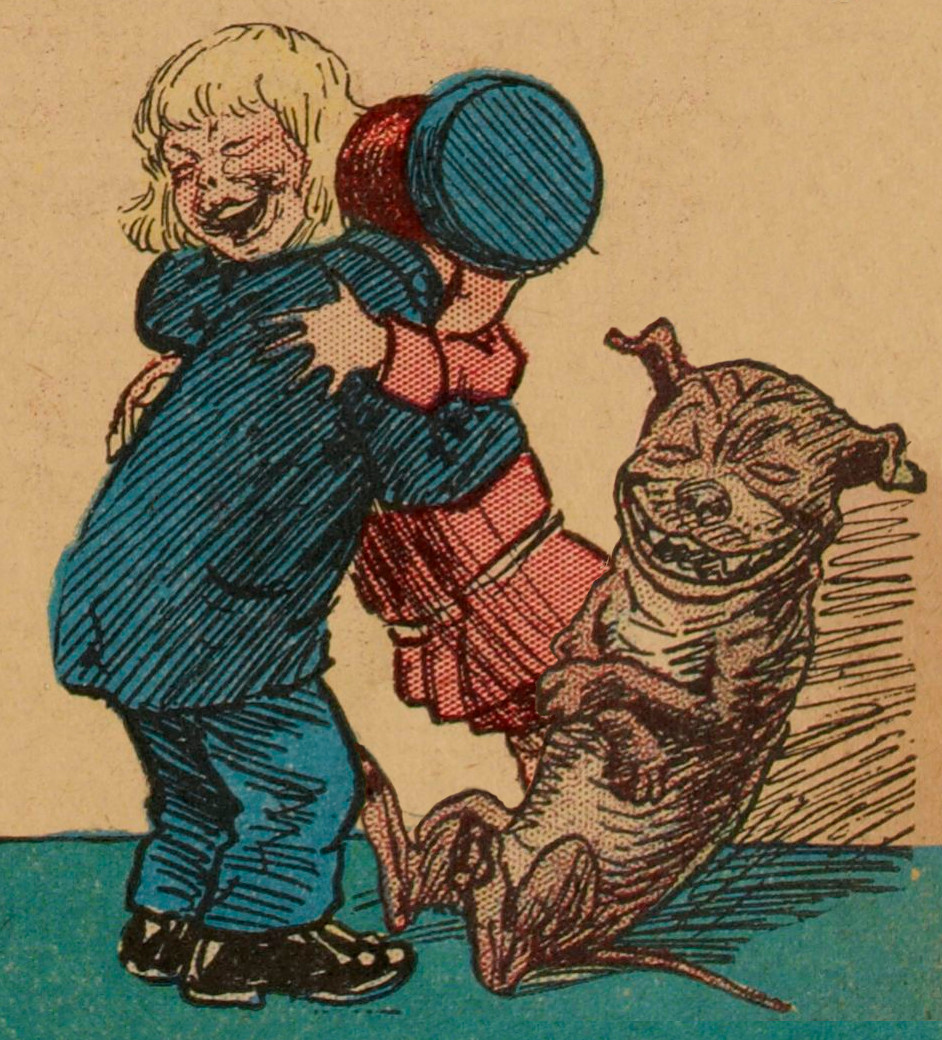

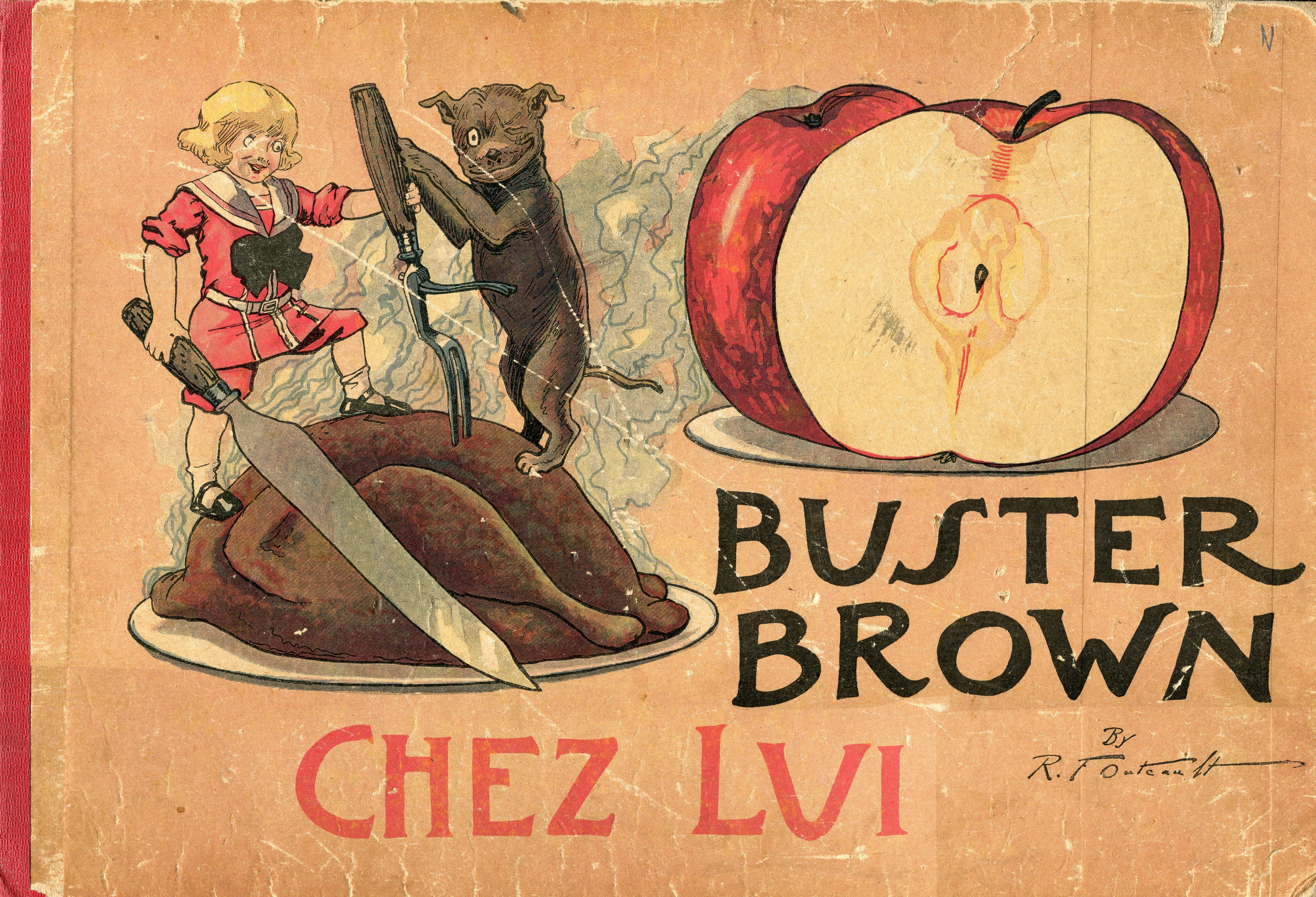

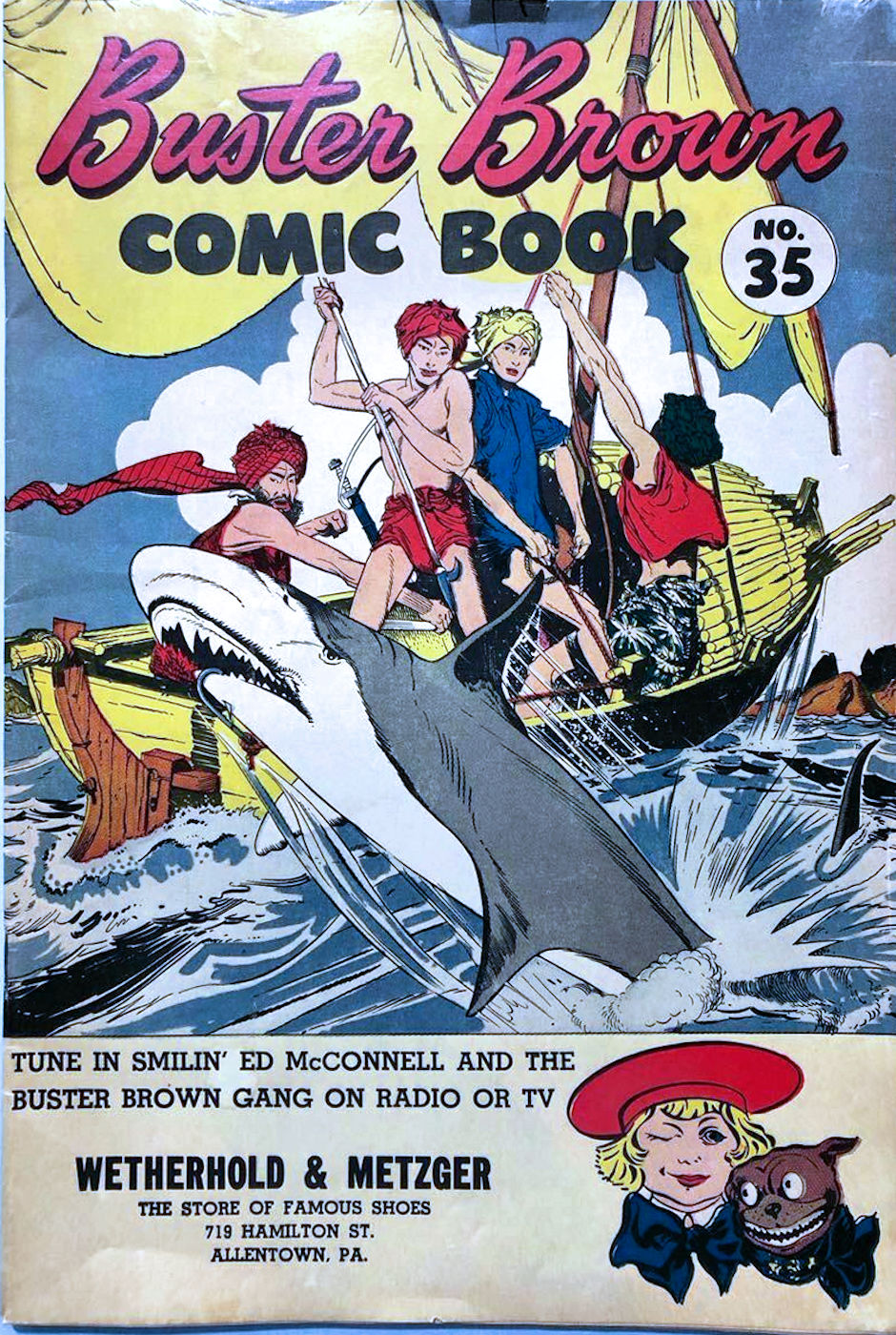
