= Norfolk jacket =

Jacket with box pleats front and back, pockets, and a self-belt

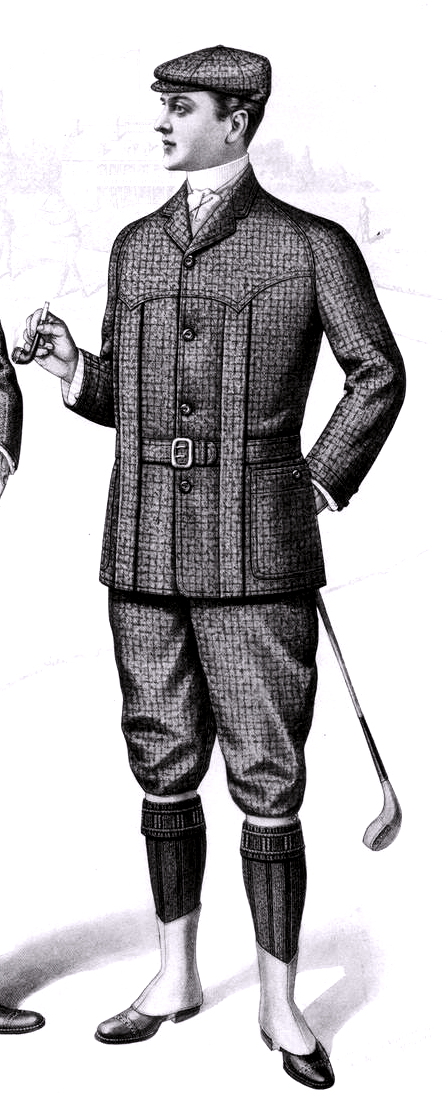
Golfing costume consisting of Norfolk jacket and knickerbockers. Detail of a fashion plate from the Sartorial Arts Journal, New York, 1901

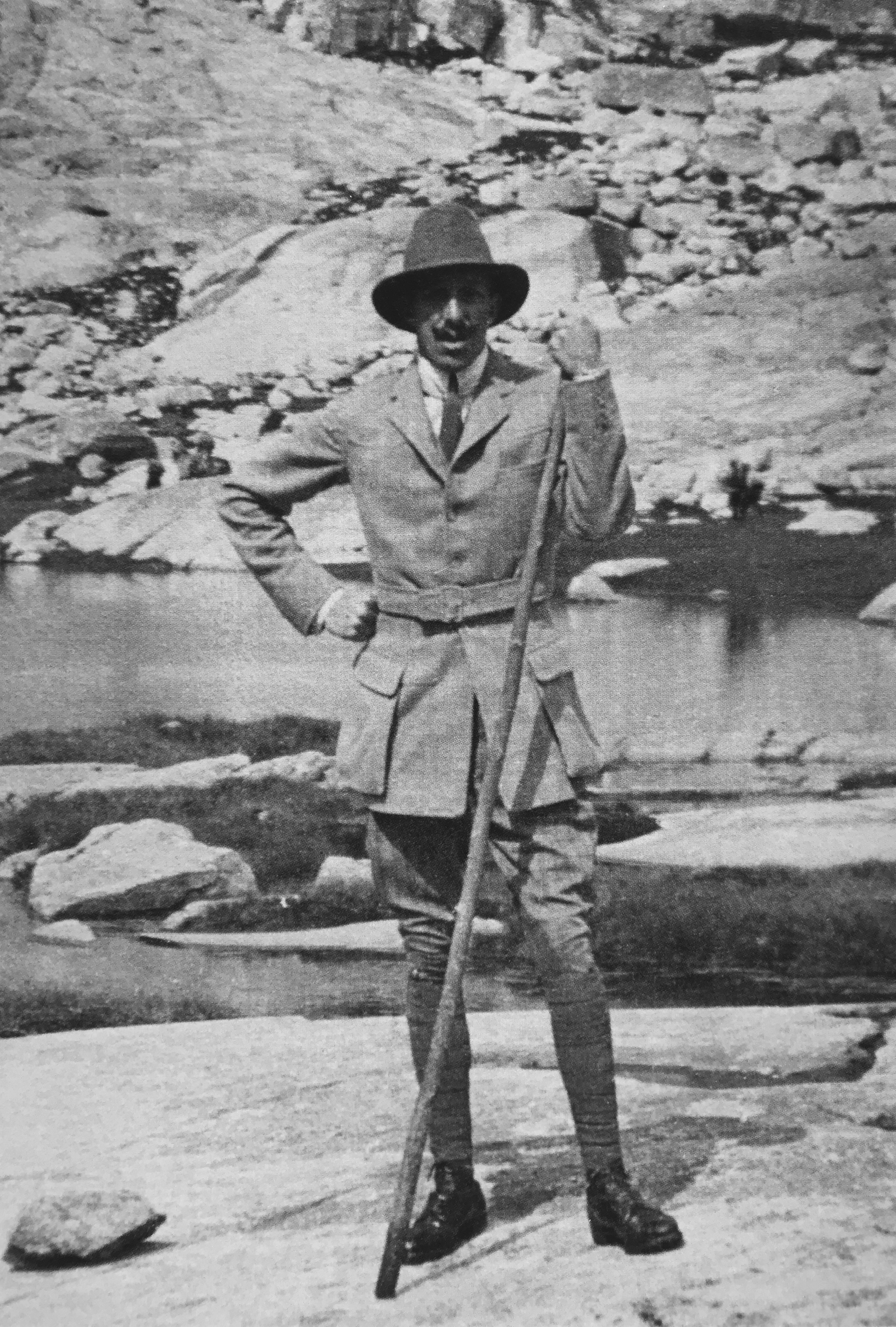
Alfonso XIII wearing a Norfolk Jacket during a chamois hunt in Picos de Europa, 1912

A Norfolk jacket is a loose, belted, single-breasted tweed jacket with box pleats on the back and front, with a belt or half-belt. It was originally designed as a shooting coat that did not bind when the elbow was raised to fire. Its origin is uncertain but it may have been named after Coke of Norfolk, the Duke of Norfolk, or after the county of Norfolk. It was made fashionable after the 1860s in the sporting circle of the Prince of Wales, later Edward VII, whose country residence was Sandringham House in Norfolk. The style was long popular for boys' jackets and suits, and is still used in some (primarily military and police) uniforms.

== History ==
There have been several theories regarding the origin of the Norfolk jacket, although none are supported by much evidence. The first theory is that the jacket originated with Henry Fitzalan-Howard, 15th Duke of Norfolk, who invented it for use as a hunting coat in the late 1860s. According to this theory, the jacket was then discovered by Edward, Prince of Wales (later King Edward VII), whose country residence was at Sandringham House in Norfolk, and was made popular by him in the 1880s. No pictures of the prince in such a garment exist, however. Another theory is that the jacket was invented by Thomas Coke, 1st Earl of Leicester (1754–1842), known as Coke of Norfolk, who regularly hosted guests such as the then Prince of Wales (the future George IV) for duck-shooting events at his estate in Holkham, Norfolk. It is also possible that there is no specific origin story, and the jacket was named as such simply because it was invented in the county of Norfolk.

The jacket has been modified several times since its invention, and its original form is now unknown. A version popularised in the 1930s consisted of a larger version of a sportscoat, together with a belt.

== Types ==
There are many types of Norfolk jacket, with variations including the type of pleat used, and the style of the belt. Popular varieties today include the full Norfolk jacket, which features three or four buttons in a single-breasted layout, with pleats and a full belt; and the half Norfolk jacket which is less pleated and has only a half belt. Both these types have a notched lapel and a patch pocket. The Norfolk suit is an attire in which a Norfolk jacket is combined with matching trousers to form a full suit. This style was popular in the 1930s and 1940s but is rare today.

== Uses ==
The Norfolk jacket has been employed in the military in the past, for example in the Australian Armed Forces in 1916, in which the women's uniform featured a Norfolk jacket combined with a felt hat, and by the North-West Mounted Police in Canada in the 1870s. It was also popularised in the Sears Catalog as a boy's garment in the early twentieth century, alongside the Buster Brown suit.

== See also ==
- British country clothing
