= Arch Presby =

American actor

George Archibald Presby (August 27, 1907 – January 22, 2007) was a Canadian-born, American radio and television announcer.

Born in Sherbrooke, Quebec, Presby began his announcing career at CFDC in Vancouver in 1925, and remained with the station at the point where its call letters changed to the current CKWX two years later. Afterwards he moved to the U.S., and between 1928 and 1935 he worked at KOMO in Seattle, Washington and KEX in Portland, Oregon.

In 1935, Presby moved to San Francisco, California, where he became the staff announcer for NBC on the West Coast, and also did local announcing work for its Blue Network flagship station, KGO. He was the announcer for years on the program Bughouse Rhythm, which showcased leading jazz and swing musicians. After the network transferred its West Coast programming operations to their newer Radio City studios in Hollywood, Presby moved there in 1942 and remained in that base of operations for the rest of his career (which included another move to the network's Color City complex in Burbank, starting in the 1950s). As NBC did not own a radio station in Los Angeles, he also handled local announcing work for its affiliated station, KFI.

After NBC launched its Los Angeles television station, KNBH (later KRCA-TV and now KNBC) in 1949, Presby became one of the station's first announcers. His most famous television credit was as announcer, and the voice of "Froggy the Gremlin," on Smilin' Ed's Gang (he had also served in both capacities on the radio show) and its successor, Andy's Gang. Later in the 1950s, he hosted a local children's show as "Uncle Archie."

Presby remained chief West Coast announcer for NBC, and booth announcer for KNBC, until his retirement in 1972. After retiring, he settled in Vista, California, and then moved to Escondido, California in 1998. He died in Escondido on January 22, 2007, at age 99.
