= Froggy the Gremlin =

Fictional character created by Smilin' Ed McConnell

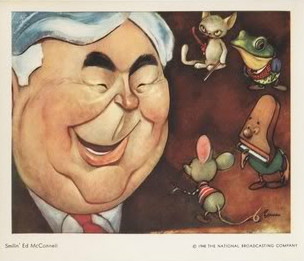
Froggy with Smilin' Ed and the cast of Smilin' Ed's Buster Brown Gang, 1947.

Froggy the Gremlin was a character created by Smilin' Ed McConnell and brought to radio in the 1940s and television in 1950s on the Smilin' Ed's Gang show, and later Andy's Gang TV show, hosted by actor Andy Devine after McConnell's death.

== The character ==
Froggy was a troublemaker. Disrespectful of adult authority figures, Froggy played practical jokes and disrupted the presentations of other guests. If a guest were to demonstrate how to paint a wall, he might say, "And now I'm going to take this can of paint..." Froggy would chime in, "And dump it over my head." And the confused guest would proceed to do so.

On radio and the early TV shows, Froggy's voice was frequently supplied by Arch ("Archie") Presby, who was also the program's announcer.

He appeared on screen in a puff of smoke with the catchphrase, "Hiya, kids! Hiya hiya hiya hiya!" The human host had another catchphrase, directed to Froggy, "Plunk your magic twanger, Froggy!" Followed by a "twangayangayang" sound. On radio, it was then followed by a raspberry. Froggy would appear atop an armoire.

== See also ==
- Vito Scotti
