= The Thin White Line =

The Thin White Line may refer to:

- The Thin White Line (Family Guy), an episode of the TV series Family Guy
- The Thin White Line (Millennium), an episode of the TV series Millennium
- The Wild Geese (Carney novel), a 1978 novel by Daniel Carney, originally titled The Thin White Line
