= Buckner & Garcia =

American musical duo

- Origin: Akron, Ohio, U.S.
- Genres: Folk rock, pop rock
- Years active: 1972–2015
- Label: Columbia
- Past members: Jerry Buckner; Gary Garcia
- Website: bucknergarcia.com

Buckner & Garcia was an American musical duo consisting of Jerry Buckner and Gary Garcia from Akron, Ohio. Their first recording was made in 1972, when they performed a novelty song called "Gotta Hear the Beat", which they recorded as Animal Jack. Later, in 1980, they wrote a novelty Christmas song titled "Merry Christmas in the NFL", imagining sports journalist Howard Cosell as Santa Claus. The recording was credited to Willis the Guard (a character performed by Atlanta radio personality Bob Carr) and fictional group Vigorish. The song reached No. 82 on the Billboard charts.

However, the duo is best known for their hit novelty song "Pac-Man Fever", released in 1981 on a local record label, BGO Records. Shortly after the duo signed a record deal with Columbia/CBS Records and the record was released nationally. An album of the same name quickly followed composed entirely of video game songs. The single and album both received gold records for combined sales of over two and a half million copies worldwide. The duo later followed up that single with "Do the Donkey Kong", which only made the Bubbling Under Hot 100 Charts, peaking at No. 103.

== History ==
The duo's intended follow-up to "Pac-Man Fever" was "E.T., I Love You", which was delayed for release by the label in favor of Neil Diamond's unauthorized "Heartlight". They released a re-recorded version of the song on their 1999 album Now & Then. The Starlight Children's Chorus recorded a cover version on their album E.T., I Love You & Other Extra Terrestrial Songs for Children. In 1985, Anne Murray's recording of "On and On", a song written by Jerry Buckner, became a top 10 hit on the Country/Easy Listening charts.

In the mid-1990s, Sony Music Entertainment declined to re-release the Pac-Man Fever album to CD for reasons unknown. To meet the growing demand for a reissue of the album, the band released a re-recorded version on CD in 1999. When the duo re-formed the band in 1999 to re-record the album, Danny Jones became the group's drummer, Whitaker having died in the interim. Stewart returned as bassist; none of the other band members returned. The duo followed this up with Now & Then, an album that included four new songs including a new recording of "E.T., I Love You".

The pair continued to collaborate, including writing and performing on many original songs for the national restaurant chain Waffle House jukeboxes, several of which were released on a pair of albums.

In 2009, "Pac-Man Fever" ranked at No. 98 on VH1's "Top 100 Greatest One-Hit Wonders of the 80s" list. On June 10, 2010, the duo released a song titled "Keepin' the Dream Alive", with part of the proceeds being donated to aid the All-American Soap Box Derby in their hometown of Akron.

In June 2011, Jerry Buckner and Gary Garcia were interviewed during a live Pac-Man tournament being streamed on the website Giant Bomb to promote the release of their music on the Rock Band Network. Ryan Davis of Giant Bomb jokingly said during the following episode of the Giant Bombcast that the duo should make a song about them, leading Buckner & Garcia to secretly create the song "Found Me the Bomb" about the site and its staff. The song was revealed during Whiskey Media's Big Live Live Show: Live 2 livestream on September 9, 2011, and was distributed free on Giant Bomb and as part of a second Rock Band Network song pack.

On November 17, 2011, Gary Garcia died unexpectedly at his home in Englewood, Florida, at age 63. Buckner later worked with Jamie Houston to write the song "Wreck It, Wreck-It Ralph!" for the Disney film Wreck-It Ralph (2012).

== Jerry Buckner ==
Under the pseudonym Jerry Martin, Buckner wrote a song titled "Letter to Saddam Hussein" in 1991. The song charted at number 71 on the Hot Country Songs chart that March.

Following Gary Garcia's death in 2011, Jerry continued on as a songwriter, keyboardist, and arranger. His songs have been recorded by Anne Murray ("On and On"), Bertie Higgins ("The Wall"), Bobby Vinton ("The Wall"), and Seiko ("So in Love with You"). He has scored original music for television and motion picture soundtracks along with jingles for a variety of commercial clients including Coca-Cola, Papa John's, DirecTV and Waffle House.

In 2012, Buckner co-produced and performed the title track to the hit Disney movie Wreck-It Ralph, which received numerous awards including Critics' Choice for "Best Movie", Annie Awards for "Best Movie" and "Best Soundtrack", and was nominated for an Oscar.

Original members of the duo's band consisted of Ginny Whitaker (drums), Larry McDonald (bass guitar), Chris Bowman (lead and rhythm guitar), Rick Hinkle (lead and rhythm guitar on "Pac-Man Fever", "Mousetrap" and "Goin' Berserk"), Mike Stewart (Moog synthesizer on "Mousetrap" and "Goin' Berserk"), and David "Cozy" Cole (syndrum on Pac-Man Fever). Steve Carlisle and Sharon Scott provided background vocals on "Pac-Man Fever".

== Albums and track list ==
=== Pac-Man Fever ===
1. "Pac-Man Fever" (Pac-Man)
2. "Froggy's Lament" (Frogger)
3. "Ode to a Centipede" (Centipede)
4. "Do the Donkey Kong" (Donkey Kong)
5. "Hyperspace" (Asteroids)
6. "The Defender" (Defender)
7. "Mousetrap" (Mouse Trap)
8. "Goin' Berzerk" (Berzerk)

=== Now & Then ===
1. "Do the Funky Broadway"
2. "Pogwild" (Pogs)
3. "It's Allright" [sic]
4. "Hostage"
5. "E.T., I Love You"
6. "E.T., I Love You" (Karaoke Version)
7. "Pac-Man Fever" (Karaoke Version)
8. "Pac-Man Fever" (Unplugged Version)

=== Now & Then (rerelease) ===
1. "Hostage"
2. "E.T., I Love You"
3. "Mr. T"
4. "I Gotta Hear the Beat"
5. "Loose in the Streets"

== Band members ==
Pac-Man Fever (1981‒1982)

- Gary Garcia - lead vocals, guitar
- Jerry Buckner - keyboards, background vocals
- Chris Bowman - guitar
- Larry McDonald - bass
- Ginny Whitaker - drums
- David "Cozy" Cole - syndrum (on "Pac-Man Fever")
- Rick Hinkle - guitar (on "Pac-Man Fever", "Mousetrap" and "Goin' Berzerk")
- Steve Carlisle - background vocals (on "Pac-Man Fever")
- Sharon Scott - background vocals (on "Pac-Man Fever")
- Mike Stewart - Moog synthesizer (on "Mousetrap" and "Goin' Berzerk")

1982‒1999

- Gary Garcia - lead vocals, guitar
- Jerry Buckner - keyboards, background vocals
- Chris Bowman - guitar
- Mike Stewart - bass, keyboards
- Ginny Whitaker - drums

1999‒2011

- Gary Garcia - lead vocals, guitar
- Jerry Buckner - keyboards, background vocals
- Mike Stewart - bass, guitar, keyboards, background vocals
- Danny Jones - drums, background vocals

Wreck-It, Wreck-It Ralph (2012)

- Danny Jones - lead vocals, drums
- Jerry Buckner - keyboards, background vocals
- Chris Bowman - guitar
- Mike Stewart - bass, keyboards
