= Dick Whittington and His Cat =

English folk tale

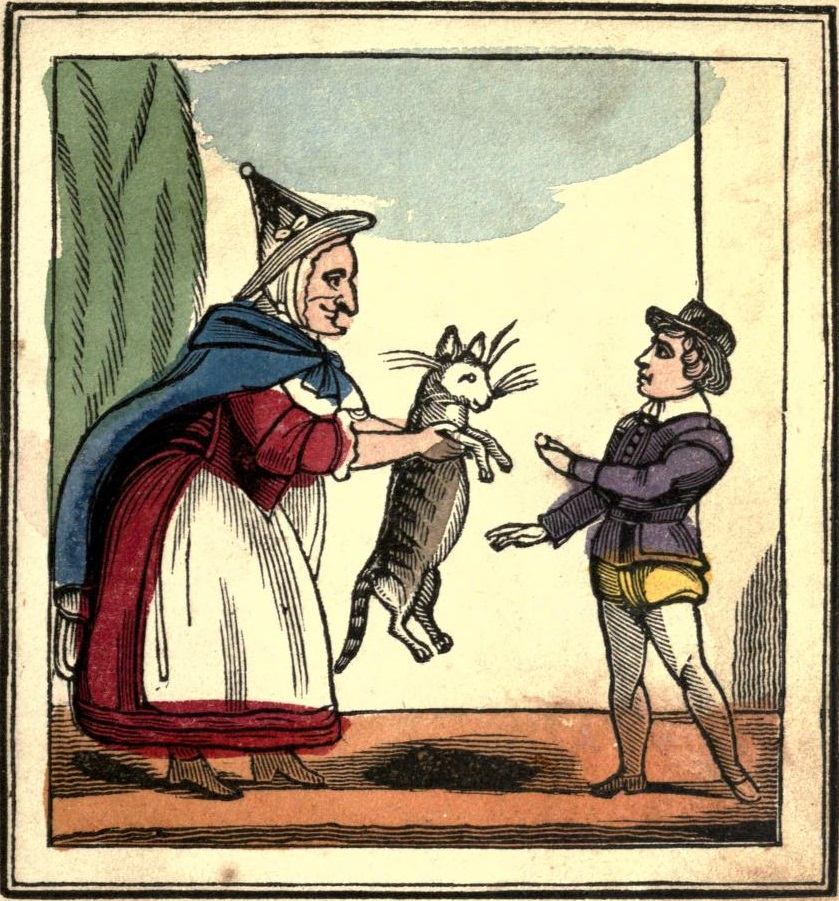
Dick Whittington buys a cat from a woman. Coloured cut from a children's book published in New York, c. 1850 (Dunigan's edition)

Dick Whittington and His Cat is the English folklore surrounding the real-life Richard Whittington (c. 1354 – 1423), wealthy merchant and later Lord Mayor of London. The legend describes his rise from poverty-stricken childhood with the fortune he made through the sale of his cat to a rat-infested country. Although the real Whittington was actually of high birth and likely did not own a cat, he did become a merchant and politician and was remembered for his public projects and charitable investments.

Another element in the legend is that Dick attempted to flee his service as a scullion one night, heading towards home (or reached Highgate Hill in later tradition), but was dissuaded by the sound of Bow bells, which promised he would be lord mayor of London one day.

Since the pre-Victorian era, the story has been a favourite subject of British pantomime, especially during Christmas season.

== Overview ==
Written forms date from the early 1600s, over 150 years after the death of the historical Whittington. A drama play (1604–05) and ballad (1605) are known only by name; Richard Johnson's ballad of 1612 is the earliest-surviving piece that refers to Whittington making his fortune with his cat. This early ballad already contains the tradition that Whittington fled his scullion's service and travelled towards home, but was beckoned back by the London bells which predicted his future of becoming mayor.

The earliest known prose rendition is The Famous and Remarkable History of Sir Richard Whittington by "T. H." (Thomas Heywood), published 1656 in chapbook form, which specified that the bells were those of Bow Church (St Mary-le-Bow), and that the boy heard them at Bunhill. Common chapbooks of a later period wrote that the boy reached as far as Holloway on the night he fled. Links to this village have not been corroborated in early folklore or literature, and it is thought to be an 18th-century invention. But based on this tradition, the landmark Whittington Stone at the foot of Highgate Hill is commonly perceived to be the place where Dick Whittington stopped and heard the famous bells.

The story was adapted into puppet play by Martin Powell in the early 18th century. Later, it has been performed as stage pantomimes and children's plays. It has also been retold as a children's story by a number of printers and authors to this day.

A number of foreign and medieval analogues exist that exhibit the motif ("Whittington's cat" motif, N411.2), where the hero obtains wealth by selling a cat, typically in a rodent-infested place direly in need of one. The tale is catalogued Aarne–Thompson (AT) tale type 1651, "Whittington's Cat".

== Synopsis ==
The following summary gives a comparison of three textual sources. B = Johnson's ballad, H = prose by Heywood, signed T. H. (Wheatley ed.); (Note: Entitled The Famous and Remarkable History of Sir Richard Whittington. View at Internet Archive.) C = Late chapbook (18th to 19th-century printing by J. Cheney):

=== To London ===
Dick Whittington was a poor orphan boy, languishing in Lancashire (B), or some unnamed place in the country (H, C). (Note: Lysons' investigations determined that the historical Whittington family base was in a village in Gloucestershire by Richard's time. But popular legend localize him variously to "Taunton Dean", "Ellesmere in Shropshire", or "some unknown town in Hereforshire".) He set off to seek his fortune in London (B, H, C), enticed by the rumour that its streets were paved with gold (C). But he soon found himself cold and hungry, (Note: It is winter season according to H.) and fell asleep at the gate of the home of a wealthy merchant named Fitzwarren (H, C). (Note: The ballad does not name the merchant, but the prose versions supply the name of Fitzwarren, the mercer with whom the historical Richard Whittingon apprenticed.) Fitzwarren gave him lodging and hired him to be the scullion in the kitchen (B, H, C).

=== Dick and his cat ===
In the prose versions, an account of Dick Whittington's cat subsequently follows, but in the ballad, it is preceded by Dick's flight and church bells episode.

In the prose legend, Dick is provided quarter at the Fitzwarrens' garret (room in the attic) (H, C), which was infested with rats and mice (H, C). But Dick owned a cat (B, H, C) that the prose versions say he had bought for a penny he earned by shining shoes (H, C). (Note: "for going of an errand, or for making clean boots or shooes [sic.] or the like" (H); "a gentleman... gave... a penny for brushing his shoes" (C)) The cat controlled his rodent problem, which made her an indispensable companion.

When Fitzwarren organized a trade expedition sending the merchant ship Unicorn (H), Dick's cat was "ventured" to this mission to be sold for profit abroad (B, H, C). The versions also differ regarding the circumstances: either Dick relinquished the cat of his own volition, hoping its sale in a foreign land might reap a "store of gold" towards the fulfillment of the omen of the bells (B), or, Dick was compelled to do so by Fitzwarren, who maintained a steadfast rule that everyone in his household should have some article of worth riding on the venture, with due dividends forthcoming from the proceeds (H, C).

=== Flight, and the bells tolling ===
Dick became disenchanted with the scullion's lot and attempted to flee, either because he received only room and board for his labours but was denied monetary wages (B), or because the kitchen maid (H) or female cook named Mrs. Cicely (C) abused and physically beat him beyond his tolerance. He ran as far away as Bunhill (H) or Holloway (C), where he heard "London Bells" (B), Bow bells (C), or the bells of "Bow Church" (H), which seemed to be telling him,

Turn again Whittington, Lord Mayor of London (H).

and persuaded him to retrace his steps. (The wording of the bells' message differs slightly according to the textual source.)

=== Rags to riches ===
The ship was driven off course to the Barbary Coast, where the Moorish king purchased the entire cargo for a load of gold, and insisted on entertaining the English traders with a feast. But the banquet was swarmed with rats and mice, whereby the English "factor" (business agent) informed their hosts that they were in possession of a creature which could exterminate these vermin (H, C). Thus Dick Whittington's cat was immediately put to the test, chasing and destroying the rodents. The Moors, even more pleased to learn that the cat was pregnant, paid more (H) (or ten times more (C)) for the cat than the rest of the cargo combined.

The ship returned to London and Fitzwarren who was apprised of the success of the venture (at his home on Leadenhall (H)), summoned the besmirched scullion Dick Whittington to the parlour (H) (or compting-room (C)) and sat him in a seat, addressing him in dignified fashion as Master (H) or Mr. Whittington. Dick was upset at first that this was being done in mockery, but Fitzwarren insisted it was all in earnest, explaining that the profits from the ship now made Dick a richer man than himself (C, H). Dick married his former master's daughter Alice Fitzwarren (C, H), and joined his father-in-law in his business (H). In time, Whittington became the Lord Mayor of London three times, just as the bells had predicted. Whittington's acts of charity included the building of a college, a church (B, H, C), and Newgate Prison (B, H, C). He also burnt the bonds he owned, which the Crown had issued to fund the war (B, H).

== Whittington Stone ==
Today, on Highgate Hill in front of Whittington Hospital, there is a statue in honour of Whittington's legendary cat on the site where, according to late versions of the story, the distant Bow Bells beckoned young Dick back to London to claim his fortune. The cat statue was placed atop the Whittington Stone later, in 1964.

The site of the Whittington Stone lies within confines of "Upper Holloway" according to 19th-century writers, which corresponds with some chapbooks that say the boy ran away to as far away as "Holloway". (Note: Actually Upper Holloway ends at the foot of Highgate Hill and was once known as Lower or South Highgate, until the underground station was renamed to Archway. Therefore the sculpture of Whittington's cat is currently situated at the foot of Highgate Hill in Archway.)

It is not clear how far back this marker can be dated. Whittington biographer Lysons felt it stood there as a marker for "many centuries", even if it was actually just the debris of an old cross with only the plinth or base remaining, as some had suggested. Henry B. Wheatley argued that Whittington's association to "Holloway" must have been a later embellishment, as it is lacking in the early T. H. text (in which the boy only goes as far as Bunhill, just north of London). He thus does not think the stone could be dated anywhere near-contemporaneously to Whittington's lifespan, but he does allow that a purported stone was removed in 1795, so that the tradition at least predated the relocation of Whittington College to Highgate. (Note: Note that Whittington College was relocated again in c. 1960s to its current location, and the Stone is no longer as near the College as once were.)

Wheatley also observed that Holloway was at such a distance that it would have been difficult for a child to have reached there by foot and returned the next morning. and that it was only barely within earshot of the bells of "Bow Church". (Note: The general area (Islington) was on the outer limits of where the bell could be heard in 1851, the year of The Great Exhibition (undisclosed source). At the launch of the Times Atlas of London, a sound map of London was commissioned to show how far the sound of the bells reached in 2012, and the audible range fell far short. However, in 1851, it could be heard the City of London, across Islington, Hackney, Tower Hamlets and into parts of Camden, Southwark, Newham and Waltham Forest. However, in Dick Whittington's time, ambient noise levels were fewer, and could have been clearly heard from the foot of Highgate Hill, according to Christopher Winn, who cites another studies in the 1990s.)

== Publication history ==
The earliest recorded instance of the folklore in written form is a registry notice dated 1604–1605 for a theatrical play.

The drama The History of Richard Whittington, of his lowe byrth, his great fortune was licensed for the stage 1604–1605. Based on the only remaining evidence, which comes from the record at the Stationers' Registers, there is no proof beyond doubt whether the play accounted for Dick's rise from "lowe birth" by means of a cat, but it is considered likely, since a play from the contemporary period entitled Eastward Hoe (1605) makes an explicit cat association with the line: "When the famous fable of Whittington and his puss shall be forgotten". This line also stands as the earliest surviving literary reference of Whittington and his cat.

=== Ballad ===
A lost ballad is also known to have existed from the Stationers' Register of 1605. It records "A ballad, called The vertuous Lyfe and memorable death of Sr Ri: Whittington mercer sometymes Lo. Maior of the honorable Citie of London" licensed on 16 July 1605 to be printed by John Wright. The earliest surviving complete text of the legend in any form is the ballad written by Richard Johnson on the subject. The 17-octave piece, included in Johnson's Crowne Garland of Goulden Roses (1612), begins with the following lines:

Here must I tell the praise
Of worthie Whittington...

This ballad of 1612 already contains the tradition that the hero made an attempt to flee his service as a scullion and headed towards "his country", but was persuaded to abort his flight when the London bells beckoned him back, seeming to tell him "Whittington, back return" and pronouncing the omen that he would eventually become Lord Mayor. The ballad goes on to tell (Note: As already noted, in the prose and chapbook, the cat is introduced before the bells.) how Whittington had a very humble past working as a kitchen scullion, but that he "had a cat ... And by it wealth he gat". This ballad was sung to the tune of "Dainty come thou to me". Chappell prints the musical notation to a tune that accompanied the ballad of Richard Whittington, which he suggests may be the same one as "Dainty".

Of intermediate date is a version entitled "An Old Ballad of Whittington and his Cat", printed and sold in Aldermary Church Yard, London, dated 1750(?). A copy is owned by the Bodleian Library (bequest of the Francis Douce collection), and in the U.S., by the Huntington Library and Yale University. These copies show the same woodcut illustrations. A later edition dated to 1773 was part of the Roxburghe Collection of Broadside Ballads. (Note: The artwork reprinted on p. 585 of the Roxburghe Ballads book differs from the art in the earlier edition.)

Other broadside ballad printings have been made into the 19th century. A version entitled London's Glory and Whittington's Renown; or, A Looking-Glass for Citizens of London, printed for R. Burton at the Horse-Shoe, in West Smithfield, c. 1650, has been reprinted from the Roxburghe collection. Another is a broadside published in London by J. Pitts (between 1802 and 1819).

=== Earliest chapbook version ===
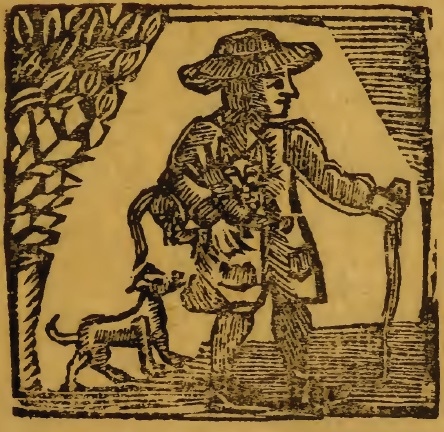
From title page of The Famous and Remarkable History of Sir Richard Whittington, Three Times Lord-Mayor of London (1770), Thomas and John Fleet, printers —Boston Public Library

The story was also set in prose, especially in the form of common chapbooks.

The Famous and Remarkable History of Sir Richard Whittington by "T. H." (first edition, 1656) is the earliest extant chapbook version of the tale in the estimation of its editor Henry B. Wheatley. (Note: Wheatley (1885) used an undated copy assigned a conjectural date of "1670?". But a "1656" print date is given elsewhere.) The author's identity is only given as "T. H.", but the work is ascribable to Thomas Heywood. Heywood certainly knew the cat story, for it is spoken of by the cast of characters in his play If You Know Not Me, You Know Nobody (1606).

=== Other chapbooks ===
A number of other chapbook editions appeared, (Note: 10 books are listed in Lane (1902), Catalogue of English and American Chapbooks, p. 35, Nos. 601–610.) such as the one datable to 1730. Perhaps the latest chapbook example is The Adventures of Sir Richard Whittingon, printed by J. Cheney, 1788–1808 which is quoted in full by Wheatley in his introduction. The later chapbooks contain embellishments such as London being a town with the reputation of being paved with gold, or the boy reaching Holloway, which is several times farther (than Bunhill).

The localization in Holloway or Highgate Hill that appeared in common chapbooks is not found in any early versions, and Wheatley believed it to be an 18th-century invention. Holloway is situated in a historically inconsistent direction since it lies up north, which contradicts the tradition that the boy was fleeing towards home; (Note: To "his country" as given in the Ballad of 1612.) the real Whittington's place of origin being Gloucester, lying westward.

=== Modern printings ===
The artist George Cruikshank published an illustrated version of the story in about 1820. The Australian Joseph Jacobs printed a version that is a composite of three chapbook texts in his English Fairy Tales (1890).

Cynthia Harnett's Ring Out Bow Bells! (1953) is a retelling of the legend, as is a 1958 adaptation titled Dick Whittington and His Cat, written by Oscar Weigle and published by Wonder Books.

== Origins in England ==
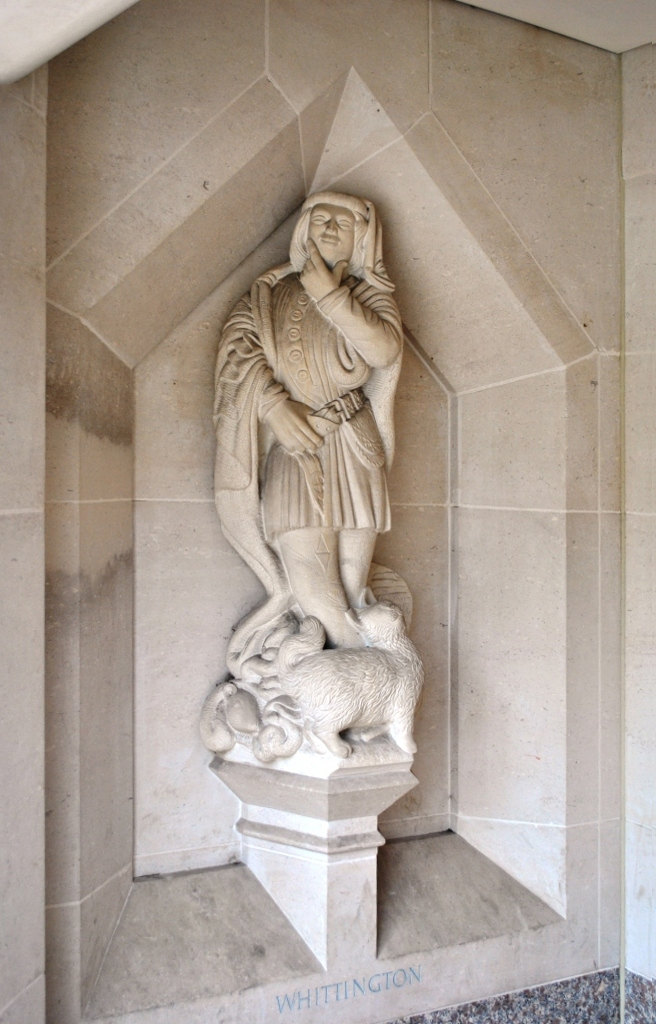
Dick Whittington and His Cat, a statue in the Guildhall, London —Laurence Tindall (1999)

The story is only loosely based on the life of Richard Whittington. Although Alice Fitzwarren, Dick's love interest in the play, is named after the historical Richard Whittington's wife, the cat story cannot be traced to any early historical source, and there is insufficient evidence that Whittington ever owned a cat.

It is unknown how the cat story came to be attached to Whittington. Suggestions were made that the cat may be a corruption of the French achat meaning "purchase" (Henry Thomas Riley), or that it may come from the word "cat", another name for a coal-carrying boat which Whittington may have engaged in his business (Samuel Foote), (Note: Uttered by Sir Matthew Mite, a character in Foote's 1772 play The Nabob) but these explanations were downplayed as implausible by later commentators.

The Elstracke portrait of Whittington and his cat probably dates to around 1605, and does not predate the times of the earliest literary adaptations. But commentators have strived to demonstrate that various pieces of art and architecture might be allusions to the legend of Dick Whittington and His Cat that predate the early 1600s (See §Relics).

== Origins in Persia and Italy ==
Antiquarians have noticed similarities to foreign tales of medieval origin, which tells of a character who makes his fortune selling his cat abroad. The motif was later catalogued "Whittington's cat" (N411.2) in Stith Thompson's motif-index scheme.

Perhaps the earliest version is Persian. Localized around Keish (Kish Island), this version tells of a certain widow's son who lived in the 10th century and made his fortune in India with his cat. This tale occurs in the Tarik al-Wasaf (Tārīkḣ-i Waṣṣāf), a 14th-century chronicle. The similarity was noted by James Morier, Second Journey (1818), and William Gore Ouseley, Travels (1819). (Note: Morier was staffed to Persian ambassador, Gore Ouseley, from whom he heard the tale. The younger Ouseley was stationed around the same period, 1810–, during his uncle's ambassadorship.)

Perhaps the next version is Italian. The story is "found in a German chronicle of the thirteenth century", but localized in Venice, Italy. Albert von Stade in his Chronicon Alberti Abbati Stadensis, writing on the events in 1175, (Note: His main topic was the development that year in the strife between the then-emperor (Manuel I Komnenos) and Venice.) sidetracks into a legendary tale involving two early citizens of Venice. The rich man about to mount on a trade expedition offers to take a consignment of merchandise from the poor man (who could only afford 2 cats), and a great profit is realized to reward the poor friend. Keightley, who identified the tale as a parallel Whittington's, said the legend "was apparently an old one in Italy", although nothing was certain beyond it being known in the 13th century. Stith Thompson also noted this version in his seminal book The Folktale, about the Whittington tale harking back to a literary version written around 1175.

Two other Italian examples can be noted. One was told by Lorenzo Magalotti (d. 1732), regarding a 16th-century merchant Ansaldo degli Ormanni who made his fortune selling his cat to the king of the isle of Canary (Canaria). Another, the Novella delle Gatte ("Tale of the she-cats") told by Piovano Arlotto (d. 1484), was published in the collection of witticisms (Facetiae) attributed to him.

The next version nationally dates to the early 1600s, in England (see above).

An Ethiopian version of the story was written down between 1600 and 1632, although with the addition of the Virgin Mary as a character and the poor man buying the cat for two grains of gold.

An excellent source of various stories is older but still useful, Keightley, who devoted Chapter VII of his Tales and Popular Fictions (1834) to the topic, boasting of the largest compilation of these parallels ever. though he was not the first to make note of the parallels in published form.

"Whittington and his Cat" is listed as one of the analogues grouped under Grimms' tale KHM 70 Die drei Glückskinder ("The Three Sons of Fortune") in Bolte and Polívka's Anmerkungen. The list organizes parallel folktales by different language (including Dutch and German printings of "Whittington and his Cat").

Stith Thompson suggests the tale has migrated to Indonesia via oral transmission and seems popular in Finland.

Another parallel could be found in Puss in Boots.

=== Tale type ===
In modern folkloristics, tales with the same plot structure are classified under Aarne–Thompson (AT) tale type 1651 "Whittington's Cat". Examples of the tale type need not feature a cat, and the helper can be replaced by the angel St. Michael or St. Joseph.

== Stage productions ==
The story has been adapted into puppet play, opera, dramatic play, and pantomime.

=== Puppet play ===
There is an early record of puppet performance of the legend, dating to Samuel Pepys's diary of 21 September 1668, which reads: "To Southwark Fair, very dirty, and there saw the puppet show of Whittington, which was pretty to see".

At Covent Garden, performances of "Whittington and his Cat" were put on by the puppeteer Martin Powell (fl. 1710–1729). Powell was a successful showman, providing such a draw that the parish church of St. Paul would be drained of its congregation during hours of prayer when his plays were on. An advertisement bill of the puppet show has been copied out in Groans of Great Britain, once credited to Daniel Defoe but since reattributed to Charles Gildon (d. 1724), with a description of some of the many extraneously added characters and elements:

At Punch's Theater in the Little Piazza, Covent-Garden, this present Evening will be performed an Entertainment, called, The History of Sir Richard Whittington, shewing his Rise from a Scullion to be Lord-Mayor of London, with the Comical Humours of Old Madge, the jolly Chamber-maid, and the Representation of the Sea, and the Court of Great Britain, concluding with the Court of Aldermen, and Whittington Lord-Mayor, honoured with the Presence of K. Hen. VIII. and his Queen Anna Bullen, with other diverting Decorations proper to the Play, beginning at 6 o' clock.

The puppet play Whittington and his Cat was reviewed by an anonymous correspondent in The Spectator, No. 14, dated 16 March 1711, soon after it opened. (Note: Morley, in the added notes to Spectator, No. 14 states: "Powell, ... who, taking up Addison's joke against the opera from No.5 of the Spectator (March 6, 1711), produced Whittington and his Cat as a rival to Rinaldo and Armida". If so, the review in No. 14 of the journal, dated 16 March is less than a fortnight later.) It featured Punch (of the Punch and Judy shows) as did all of Powell's puppet plays. Punch danced a minuet with a trained pig in the opening scene. Punch also gave his "reflections on the French" that was a breach of "the Moral", as was King Harry (Henry VIII) resting his leg on his queen in an immodest manner. Little else on the performance can be gleaned, except that the hero's role (i.e., Punch's role) was performed in a squeaky high voice, just like the lead of the Italian opera Rinaldo and Armida, the rival draw at the time at Covent Garden which the anonymous reviewer was simultaneously critiquing. The reviewer concludes "as the Wit of both pieces are equal, I must prefer ... Mr Powell, because it is in our own language".

=== Opera ===
An opera production that never came into realization was a topic in Joseph Addison's piece in The Spectator (1711). Addison states he was "credibly informed that there was once a Design of casting into an Opera the Story of Whittington and his Cat, and that in order to it, there had been got together a great Quantity of Mice", but that Mr. Rich (Christopher Rich) who was proprietor of the playhouse (he managed several including Drury Lane theatre (Note: Rich at one time also managed Haymarket Theatre, which was where sparrows were released for the opera Rinaldo and Armida, which prompted Addison to write about the release of mice for the possible production of Whittington's tale.)) objected that the rodents once released will not be thoroughly collected. (Note: It is not so clear if Addison wrote the mice idea in earnest or in jest, but stage critic Dutton Cook (1878) in an article on "Stage Properties" repeats this story at face value. The use of sparrows is given as fact.)

Later Whittington and his Cat, an opera written by Samuel Davey, was performed at the Theatre in Smock Alley, Dublin, 1739.

Whittington, with music by Jacques Offenbach and English text by H. B. Farnie was first produced at the Alhambra Theatre over Christmas 1874–75, and in 1895 the comic opera Dandy Dick Whittington written by George Robert Sims and composed by Ivan Caryll played at the Avenue Theatre.

=== Pantomime ===
The first recorded pantomime version of the story was in 1814, starring Joseph Grimaldi as Dame Cicely Suet, the Cook.

Ella Shields (Camden Theatre, 1907), Sybil Arundale (Theatre Royal, Birmingham, 1908), Helen Gilliland (Lyceum, 1925) are among the actresses who have played the principal boy. Cast in other productions are listed below, including the production Dick Whittington, which was the 2018 winner of the Laurence Olivier Award for Best Entertainment and Family.

Dick's cat has been given the names Thomas, Tommy, Tommy Tittlemouse (1890), or Mouser (1908). (Note: Drury Lane 1908, listed below. Photographs of the show, including George Ali as cat occurs in The Sketch, 27 January 1909.) and so forth.

The pantomime has introduced an arch villain, King Rat (or the King of Rats), (Note: King Rat has been played by Andrew Sachs, and Queen Rat by Honor Blackman and other actresses.) as well as the usual pantomime fairy, the Fairy of the Bells, personifying the London bells. An early record of King Rat and fairy occurs in an 1877 production at Surrey Theatre. This production pitches the archvillain King Rat against the Fairy Queen, for whom the fairy Beau Bell serves as messenger. "King Rataplan (Rat-a-plan)" occurs even earlier, alongside "Queen Olivebranch" who assigns Cupid to uplift Dick Whittington from poverty, in a Charles Millward script for the Theatre Royal, Birmingham production of 1870.

In some versions, Dick and his cat Tommy travel to Morocco, where the cat rids the country of rats. The Sultan rewards Dick with half of his wealth.

The pantomime version remains popular today. Other notable pantomime productions included an 1877 version at the Surrey Theatre described below, as well as the following:

- 1872 on Broadway, with music by William H. Brinkworth.
- 1877 at the Surrey Theatre in London, entitled Dick Whittington and His Cat; Or, Harlequin Beau Bell, Gog and Magog, and the Rats of Rat Castle, by Frank Green, with music by Sidney Davis, opening 24 December 1877. With comedian Arthur Williams, Topsy Venn was Dick, and David Abrahams (Note: or "Master Forrest", first name not given.) as the cat. The Harlequinade also featured Tom Lovell as Clown.
- 1891 by Geoffrey Thorne, with music by William H. Brinkworth at the Grand Theatre, with Lottie Collins.
- 1894 at the Theatre Royal, Drury Lane, with a libretto by Cecil Raleigh and Henry Hamilton. The cast included Ada Blanche as Dick, Dan Leno as Jack the idle apprentice, Herbert Campbell as Eliza the cook and Marie Montrose as Alice.
- 1908 at the Theatre Royal, Drury Lane, with a libretto by J. Hickory Wood and Arthur Collins and music composed and arranged by Arthur Collins. The cast included Queenie Leighton as Dick, Wilkie Bard as Jack Idle, Marie Wilson as Alice and George Ali as Mouser, the cat.
- 1909, starring Tom Foy, Lupino Lane and Eric Campbell at the Shakespeare Theatre, Liverpool.
- 1910 at the King's Theatre Hammersmith, with a libretto by Leslie Morton. The cast included Kathleen Gray as Dick, Adela Crispin as Alice, Jack Hurst as the cat, Percy Cahill as Jack, Robb Wilton as Alderman Fitzwarren and Wee Georgie Wood as Alice's brother.
- 1923 at the London Palladium. The cast included Clarice Mayne as Dick, Hilda Glyder as Alice, Fred Whittaker as the cat, and Nellie Wallace and Harry Weldon as the villains.
- 1931 at the Garrick Theatre. The cast included Dorothy Dickson as Dick, Jean Adrienne as Alice, Roy Barbour as Alderman Fitzwarren, Hal Bryan as Idle Jack, Harry Gilmore as the cat and Jack Morrison as Susan the cook.
- 1932 at the London Hippodrome. The cast included Fay Compton as Dick, Audrey Pointing as Alice, Fred Wynne as Alderman Fitzwarren, Johnny Fuller as the cat, Leslie Henson as Idle Jack.
- 1935 at the Lyceum Theatre.
- 2017, as Dick Whittington at the London Palladium with Elaine Paige as Queen Rat, Julian Clary as the Spirit of the Bells, Diversity and Gary Wilmot as Sarah the Cook. The production also featured Paul Zerdin as Idle Jack and Nigel Havers as Captain Nigel while Alice Fitzwarren was played by Emma Williams. At the 2018 Laurence Olivier Awards, this production won the Olivier Award for Best Entertainment and Family, and Hugh Durrant was nominated for the Laurence Olivier Award for Best Costume Design.
- 2018 at the Roses Theatre, Tewkesbury where Dick was played by Amy Bridges (Jane Seymour in Six), Laura Barnard played Alice, Ben Eagle (Hamlet, USA) played the chirpy cook called Sarah and Derek Frood (BBC Poldark) played the role of King Rat.
- 2020 at the Royal National Theatre. The cast included Lawrence Hodgson-Mullings as Dick, Cleve September as Tom Cat, Melanie La Barrie as Bow Belles (a personification of Bow Bells), and Amy Booth-Steel as the Queen Rat.

=== Other adaptations ===
Dramatic play versions were written by H. J. Byron in 1861, Robert Reece in 1871.

A number of television versions have been created, including a 2002 version written by Simon Nye and directed by Geoff Posner.

== Relics ==
There are various pieces of art and architecture which have been used to try to date the Whittington association to earlier than the 1600s. The Elstracke engraving providing Whittington's portrait with a cat had been ascribed a c. 1590 date by some 19th-century authors. A Newgate statue claiming to be Whittington's cat was actually a Libertas goddess statue, and though there were suggestions it was made by the executors of Whittington's will when they rebuilt the prison, the existence of the statues prior to the Great Fire of 1666 cannot be firmly established.

Other relics are a relief tablet of a boy and animal said to be found at a home that belonged to the family, a chariot with a cat carving that was the gift of the family.

=== Early painting with cat ===
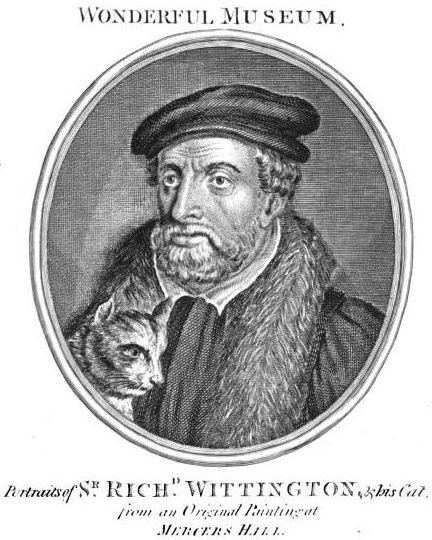
Richard Whittington and his Cat, considered a "fictitious portrait" —Benoist's engraving, after a lost painting at Mercers' Hall, from The New Wonderful Museum, and Extraordinary Magazine (1805)

A Whittington portrait painting depicting the mayor with a cat, allegedly dating to 1532, was once kept at the Mercers' Hall. The original has been lost, prompting Wheatley to remark that the disappeared artwork "can scarcely be put in evidence". However, a facsimile of it has been reproduced in engraving in The New Wonderful Museum (1805) edited by William Granger and James Caulfield (see image at top).

The portrait painting that did exist at Mercers' Hall, affixed with a 1536 date had been witnessed and described by James Peller Malcolm (d. 1815) in Londinium Redivivum, Vol. 4 (1807). The painting was in the apartment of the clerk of Mercers' Company at Mercers' Hall. According to Malcolm, this portrait of Whittington's had "on the left hand ... a black and white cat, whose right ear reaches up to the band or broad turning down to the shirt of the figure". Malcolm admits that the 1536 date had been repainted at a later date after the canvas was cropped, but commented that "it is hardly to be supposed" that this date "was then invented".

This painting had disappeared by the time Rev. Samuel Lysons, who published the mayor's biography in 1860, requested a viewing of it at Mercer's Hall. Another portrait was available for him to see, but it was more modern and did not correspond to Malcolm's descriptions. At Mercer's hall also had on display an engraved portrait of Whittington and his cat by Guillaume Philippe Benoist. The Benoist was published 1766, and according to the caption represents the Whittington and cat portrait then still hanging at Mercer's Hall. (Note: "S^{r}. Rich^{d}. Wittington, from an Original Painting at Mercers Hall". The caption and the illustration are virtually the same as the image reproduced in The New Wonderful Museum (1805), shown above. One difference is the signature "Benoist sculp" legible on bottom right rim of the 1766 print.) (Note: The Benoist was used in William Thornton's The New, Complete, and Universal History, Description, and Survey of the cities of London and Westminster (1784), as well as in Lambert's History and Survey of London (1805).)

=== Early engraving with cat ===
There was also an early engraving by Reginald Elstrack (1570 – after 1625). This engraving, entitled the "True Portraicture" or Vera Effigies Preclarmi Domini Richardi Whittington Equi Aurat is reproduced in the inset of Lyson's work. The engraving cannot be definitely dated; Lysons noted that the printmaker flourished c. 1590, and this is the date assigned by Sir Walter Besant and James Rice, but other sources give a 1605 date. On the prints can be read "R. Elstrack Sculpsit" at bottom, which is truncated in Lysons's reproduction.

It has also been noted that the engraving originally depicted Whittington with a skull under his hand, but had been replaced with a cat underneath, to cater to public taste, "as the common people did not care to buy the print without it". (Note: Lysons adduces the Elstrack's print as bearing a close resemblance ("as identical as can possibly be") to a contemporary source (an illumination on an ordinance). But this is a deathbed drawing of the mayor which does not help corroborate the cat legend. A facsimile of the deathbed drawing is given in Lysons' book.)

=== Newgate statue ===
The antiquarian Thomas Pennant believed that a statue of Whittington with his cat was installed in a niche in Newgate in 1412, by the executors of Whittington's estate, but that it was damaged in The Great Fire of 1666 and replaced. Lysons and others had lent some credance to this statement by Pennant. But much of Pennant's assumptions here have been subjected to corrections and refutations.

This "assertion that a carved figure of a cat existed on Newgate gaol before the great fire is an unsupported assumption", or so it was pronounced by historian Charles Lethbridge Kingsford. Work on Newgate at Whittington's bequest did not commence during his lifetime in 1412, but in 1442. A copy of Whittington's will kept at Guildhall that prescribes this fails to mention a statue, or him and his cat. (Note: Latin text and translation of this brief will is given by Price's article in Transactions of the London and Middlesex Archaeological Society, 5)

This statue was actually the female Liberty ("Libertas" carved on the hat) with a cat at her feet, but it was "alluding to" Richard Whittington, as explained by Maitland. The stone Liberty was one of a set of seven, the others being Peace, Plenty, Concord, and Justice, Mercy, and Truth.

This Whittington statue (Liberty statue) was taken down when the old Newgate was being demolished, in 1766 or 1776, to be placed in the new Newgate Prison. (Note: This contradicts Pennant's belief that the statue was demolished when the new Newgate Prison was built.) (Note: Year given as 1766, and paraphrase of "journal" in Price's article.) The Liberty statue could later be seen at the new Newgate Prison, but the cat was not with her.

=== Chariot with carved cat ===
Also a chariot with a carved cat, purportedly presented by Whittington's heirs to the merchant's guild in 1572, was available for the biographer Samuel Lysons to examine.

=== Boy and a cat from Gloucester ===
It was purported that in 1862 at the site of a former residence of Whittington (in Gloucester), there was unearthed a piece of stone, possibly chimney stone, bearing a bas-relief of a boy holding a cat. It was allegedly of 15th-century workmanship. The relic came into the possession of Samuel Lysons. Besant and Rice called this "remarkable proof" that the cat story was in the family, but Wheatley thought "this find, however, appears rather suspicious". This artwork could have been acquired after the cat legend was established, as American folklorist Jennifer Westwood points out, (Note: "The story is sometimes connected, whether as cause or effect, with a limestone bas-relief found in a house in Gloucester in 1862", Westwood (1984), p. 114.) and the supposed "cat" looked more like a lamb to others. The cat has been preserved at the Gloucester Folk Museum (now called Gloucester Life Museum), but taken off display.

== Sir William Craven ==
Sir William Craven was Lord Mayor of London in 1610. It has been noted that the story of "Dick Whittington and His Cat" has some similarities to Craven's career, though the story was first published before Craven became Lord Mayor.

== 56th (London) Infantry Division ==
The formation badge for the 56th Division during the Second World War featured Dick Whittington's black cat on a red background.

During the Second World War, the 56th (London) Infantry Division adopted a black silhouette of Dick Whittington's cat on a red ground as its formation sign, leading to its nickname of the 'Black Cats'.

== Gallery ==
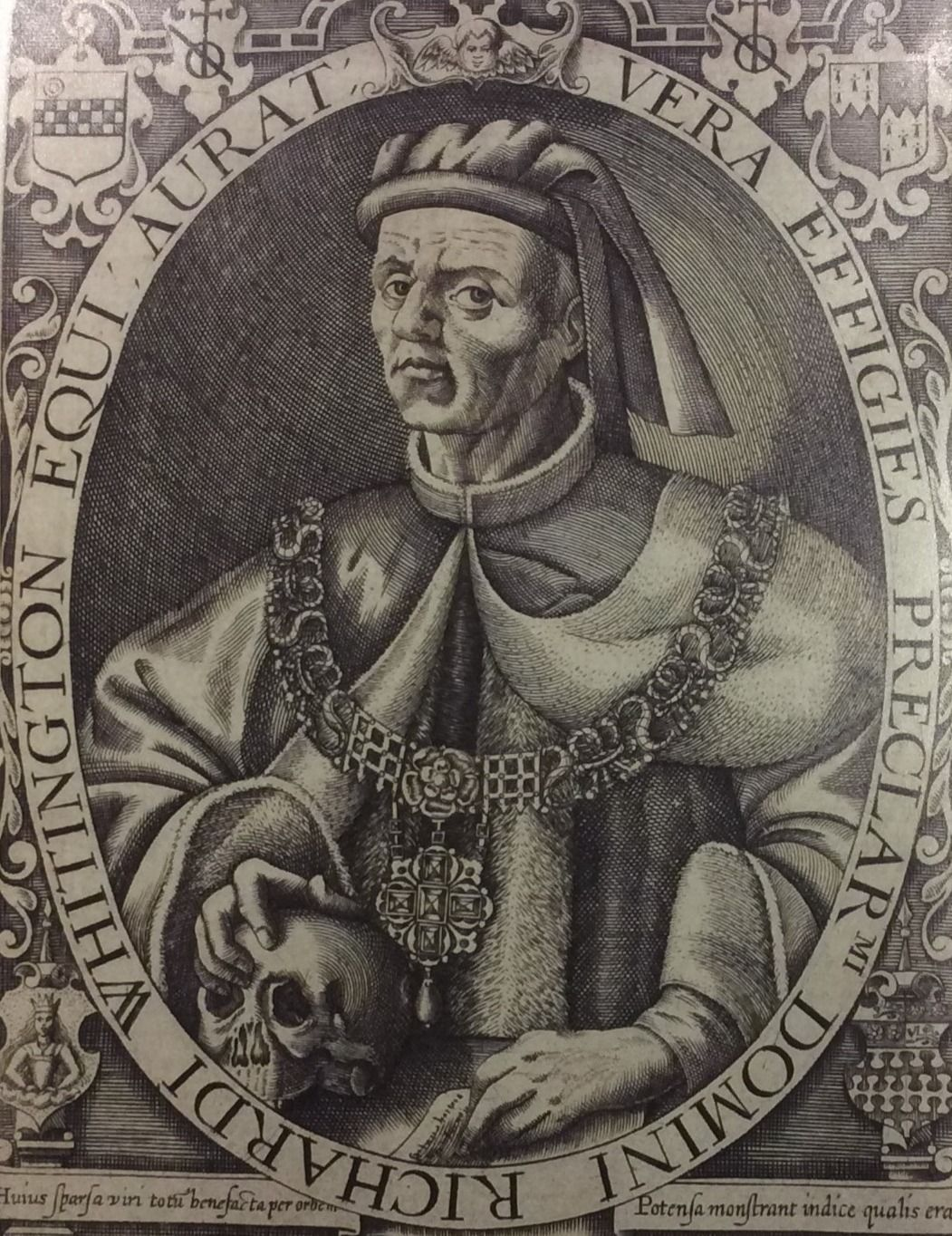
Original portrait with Skull, by Renold Elstracke circa 1590, possibly 1605

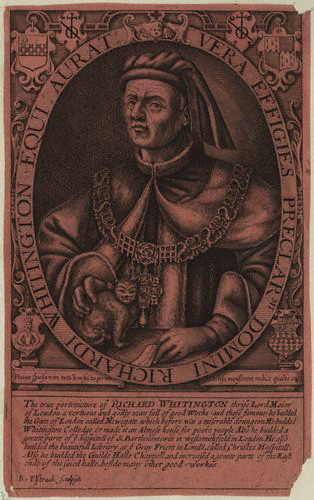
Elstrake's printseller Peter Stent has the skull changed to a cat.

William Luson Thomas softens Whittington's face.

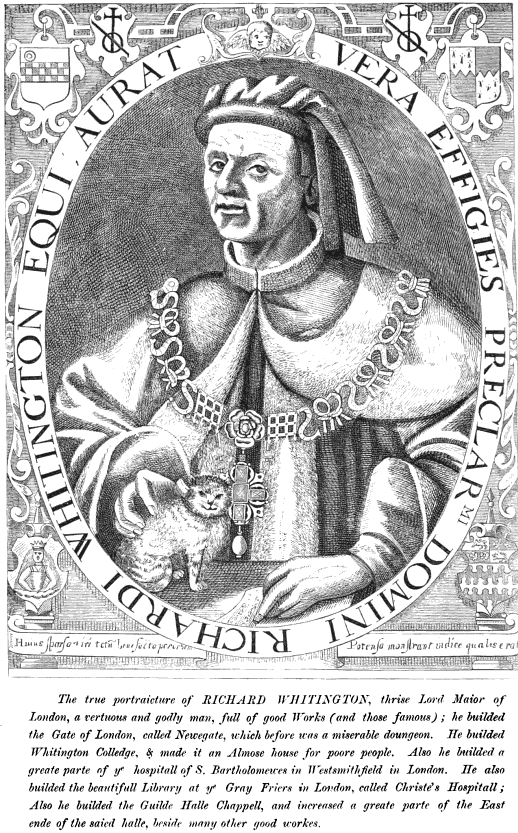
Samuel Lysons' version with a smiling cat
