= Great House =

Great House may refer to:

- a great house, a large residence and its associated household, especially in the context of the Victorian and Edwardian era

== Buildings ==
- Great House (St. Augustine, Maryland), U.S.
- Great House (Cape Ann), Massachusetts, U.S.
- Great House, Colyton, Devon, England
- Great House, Laugharne, Carmarthenshire, Wales
- Great House, Llanarth, Monmouthshire, Wales
- Great House, Llanover, Monmouthshire, Wales
- Great House at Sonning, Berkshire, England
- Great House, Bristol, England, at the site of the later Bristol Beacon
- Great house (pueblo), a type of structure found in New Mexico, U.S.

== Arts and entertainment ==
- La Grande Bretèche, an 1831 short story by Honoré de Balzac
- The Great House (film), a 1975 Spanish drama
- Great House (novel), by Nicole Krauss, 2010
- The Great House (novel), by Cynthia Harnett, 1949
- Great Houses, in the Dune universe
- Great Houses, in the BattleTech franchise
- Great Houses, in A Song of Ice and Fire
- Great Houses of Gallifrey in Doctor Who.
- Great Houses of Morrowind in The Elder Scrolls franchise.

== Other uses ==
- Seven Great Houses of Iran, seven feudal aristocracies
- a translation of the title Pharaoh

== See also ==
- English country house
- Estate houses in Scotland
- Manor house
- Mansion
