= St David's Church, Trostrey =

Coordinates: 51.7347°N 2.9283°W

Church of St David, Trostrey
- Church of St David
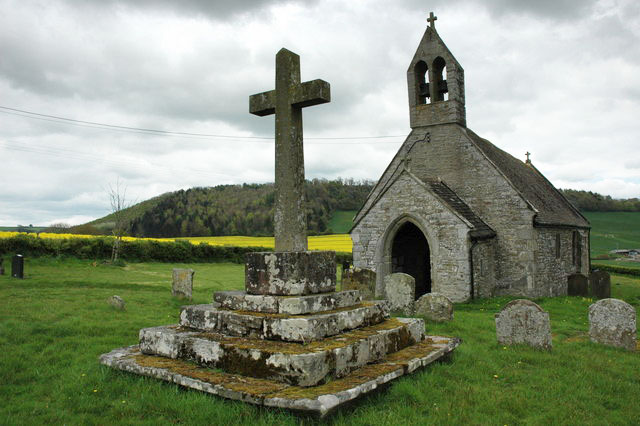
- "A well restored medieval parish church"

- Location in Monmouthshire
- Location: Trostrey, Monmouthshire
- Country: Wales
- Denomination: Church in Wales

History
- Status: parish church
- Founded: early 14th century

Architecture
- Functional status: Active
- Heritage designation: Grade II*
- Designated: 18 November 1980
- Architectural type: Church
- Style: Perpendicular

Administration
- Diocese: Monmouth
- Archdeaconry: Monmouth
- Deanery: Raglan/Usk
- Parish: Heart of Monmouthshire Ministry Area

Clergy
- Rector: Rev’d Canon Sally Ingle-Gillis

The Church of St David, Trostrey, Monmouthshire, Wales, is a parish church with its origins in the 14th century. Its founder may have been Geoffrey Marshall, Lord of Trostrey Castle. The church was substantially rebuilt in the 16th century and restored by John Prichard in 1876–1877. It remains an active parish church.

== History ==
The original church may have been founded by Geoffrey Marshall in the 14th century. However, a record exists of an earlier structure, dating from c. 1160. The church was reconstructed in the late 15th or early 16th centuries and restored in the Victorian era by John Prichard. St David's remains an active church in the parish of Trostrey.

== Architecture and description ==
The church is built of grey rubble with dressings of Old Red Sandstone. The style is Perpendicular. The building comprises a nave, chancel, porch and a double bell gable. The interior contains a "fine baroque monument" to Charles Hughes of Trostrey Court, who died in 1676. The church is a Grade II* listed building.
