= Thomas Malory =

15th-century English writer

Sir Thomas Malory
- Born: c. 1393 or 1425; Kingdom of England
- Died: c. 1470 or later
- Occupations: Knight, writer
- Notable work: Le Morte d'Arthur; Possibly The Wedding of Sir Gawain and Dame Ragnelle

Sir Thomas Malory was an English writer, the author of Le Morte d'Arthur, the classic English-language chronicle of the Arthurian legend, compiled and in most cases translated from French sources, and published by the famed London printer William Caxton in 1485. Much of Malory's life history is obscure, but he identified himself as a "knight prisoner", apparently reflecting that he was either a criminal, a prisoner-of-war, or suffering some other type of confinement. Malory's identity has never been confirmed. Since modern scholars began researching his identity the most widely accepted candidate has been Sir Thomas Malory of Newbold Revel in Warwickshire, who was imprisoned at various times for criminal acts and possibly also for political reasons during the Wars of the Roses. Recent work by Cecelia Lampp Linton, however, presents new evidence in support of Thomas Malory of Hutton Conyers, Yorkshire.

== Identity ==
Most of what is known about Malory stems from the accounts describing him in the prayers found in the Winchester Manuscript of Le Morte d'Arthur. He is described as a "knyght presoner", distinguishing him from several other candidates also bearing the name Thomas Malory in the 15th century when Le Morte d'Arthur was written.

At the end of the "Tale of King Arthur" (Books I–IV in the printing by William Caxton) is written: "For this was written by a knight prisoner Thomas Malleorre, that God send him good recovery." At the end of "The Tale of Sir Gareth" (Caxton's Book VII): "And I pray you all that readeth this tale to pray for him that this wrote, that God send him good deliverance soon and hastily." At the conclusion of the "Tale of Sir Tristram" (Caxton's VIII–XII): "Here endeth the second book of Sir Tristram de Lyones, which was drawn out of the French by Sir Thomas Malleorre, knight, as Jesu be his help." Finally, at the conclusion of the whole book: "The Most Piteous Tale of the Morte Arthure Sanz Gwerdon par le shyvalere Sir Thomas Malleorre, knight, Jesu aide ly pur votre bon mercy.", a mix of English and French roughly meaning: "The most pitiable tale of the Death of [King] Arthur, without reward for/by the knight Sir Thomas Malory; Jesus aid him by your good mercy."

However, all these are replaced by Caxton with a final colophon reading: "I pray you all gentlemen and gentlewomen that readeth this book of Arthur and his knights, from the beginning to the ending, pray for me while I am alive, that God send me good deliverance and when I am dead, I pray you all pray for my soul. For this book was ended the ninth year of the reign of King Edward the Fourth by Sir Thomas Maleore, knight, as Jesu help him for his great might, as he is the servant of Jesu both day and night."

With the exception of the first sentence of the final colophon, all the above references to Thomas Malory as a knight are, grammatically speaking, in the third person singular, which leaves open the possibility that they were added by a copyist, either in Caxton's workshop or elsewhere. However, scholarly consensus is that these references to knighthood refer to a real person and that that person is the author of Le Morte d'Arthur.

The author was educated, as most of his material "was drawn out of the French", which suggests a degree of French fluency indicating that he might have been from a wealthy family. A claimant's age must also fit the time of writing; as described below, this has been a major point of contention among all modern scholars for determining the author's identity.

== Candidates ==
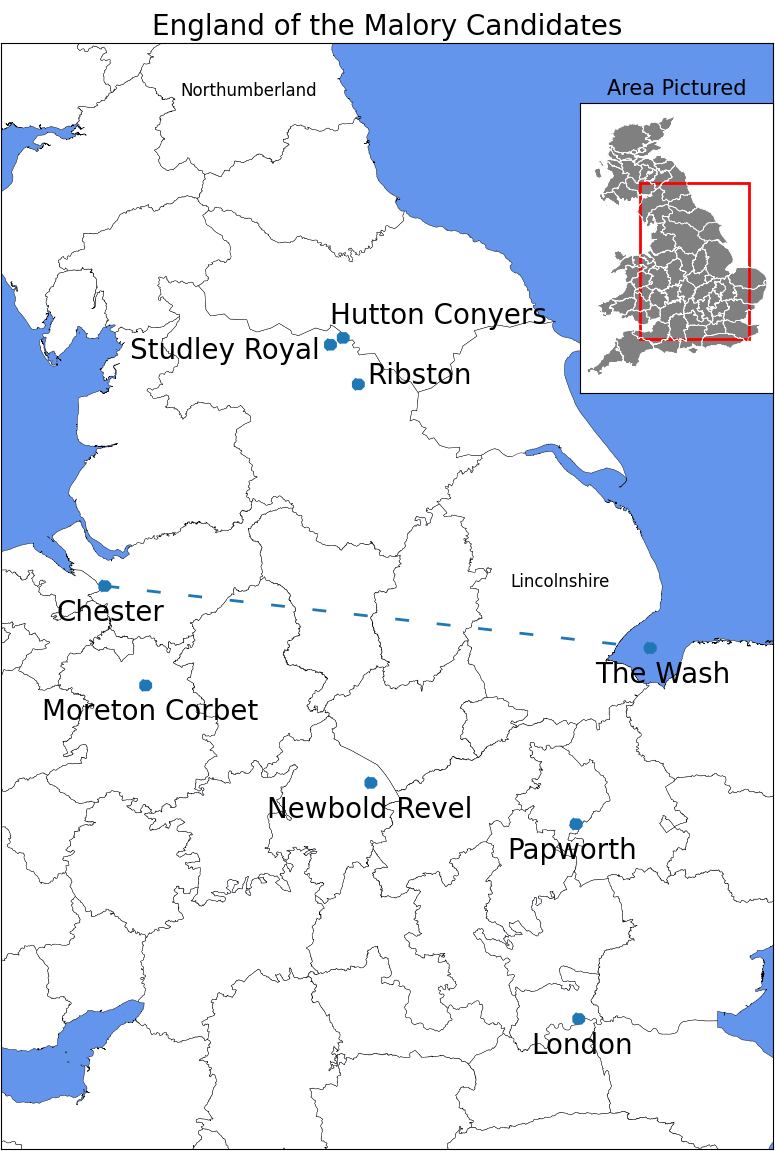
Zoomed view of England showing locations relevant to the question of Thomas Malory's identity

Since the late 19th century there has been a great deal of scholarly research into the identity of Sir Thomas Malory. As detailed below, the earliest modern investigations suggested that Sir Thomas Malory of Newbold Revel was the only Thomas Malory living in 15th-century England who was a knight. However, the apparently great age of this candidate at the time of the work's completion has always been a source of contention. In the early 20th century, scholarly revelations of this candidate's extensive criminal record and multiple imprisonments threw further doubt on the matter because of a perceived discordance with the chivalric ideals espoused in Le Morte d'Arthur. The discovery of the Winchester Manuscript in 1934 revealed that the author was in some form of imprisonment at the time of writing; this has generally been taken to support the candidate from Newbold Revel, though the support is ambiguous because that candidate's extensive prison record does not actually include the time of writing.

These tensions have inspired scholars to propose alternative identities; most notably, Thomas Malory of Papworth St. Agnes and Moreton Corbet and Thomas Malory of Hutton Conyers and Studley Royal. Both are much less attested in the documentary record than the candidate from Newbold Revel. As described in detail below: neither is clearly recorded as having been a knight, but both come from knightly families and could plausibly have been knighted. Both seem to have been of a more appropriate age at the time of writing, but neither is known to have been imprisoned at any time.

To date, no candidate for authorship has ever consistently commanded widespread support other than Malory of Newbold Revel. However, despite the evidence for other candidates being "no more than circumstantial", eminent scholars suggest that the question of the author's identity is both critically important and yet unresolved. However, Linton argues that Malory of Hutton Conyers was a knight of the church, and as her recent work garners scholarly attention, it may bring the matter into different focus.

=== Thomas Malory of Newbold Revel ===
Sir Thomas Malory of Newbold Revel
- Born: c. 1393 (contested); England
- Died: 14 March 1471
- Occupations: Knight, criminal, Member of Parliament

Since George Lyman Kittredge, a professor at Harvard, published the first significant investigation into Malory's identity in 1894, the primary candidate for authorship has been Thomas Malory of Newbold Revel in Warwickshire. Kittredge discovered a record of this Malory's service under Richard de Beauchamp, 13th Earl of Warwick in William Dugdale's Antiquities of Warwickshire (1656), stating of Sir Thomas:

In K. H.5 time, was of the retinue to Ric. Beauchamp, E. Warw. At the siege of Caleys, and served there with one lance and two archers, receiving for his lance and 1 archer xx. Li per an. And their dyet; and for the other archer, x marks and no dyet.

In modern English:

In King Henry V's time, [Malory] was of the retinue to Richard Beauchamp, Earl of Warwick at the siege of Calais, and served there with one lance and two archers, receiving for his lance and first archer 20 pounds per year and their diet; and for the other archer, 10 marks and no diet.

Dugdale's history also revealed that this Malory had served as a Member of Parliament, and recorded the date of his death, the location of his tomb, and many other details of his life and family. As Dugdale lived in Warwickshire and apparently had access to Malory's home and direct descendants during a time when Le Morte remained very popular and was still being printed, scholars have noted that any mention of his authoring Le Morte is conspicuously absent in Dugdale's record. To date, however, this candidate for authorship remains the only Thomas Malory known to be living at the time of writing who was clearly recorded as having been a knight.

Kittredge accepted the details of Dugdale's history at face value: specifically, that he was commissioned to serve at Calais under Henry V; a campaign which took place in 1414–15. Under this view, Malory would have been a junior officer in Henry V's famous Battle of Agincourt – a member of what William Shakespeare cemented in popular memory as the Band of Brothers in the famous St. Crispin's Day Speech. However, subsequent scholars have questioned this interpretation, suggesting that Dugdale's record was erroneous and that Malory instead served under Henry VI, at an action in Calais in 1436 – a brief mobilization which was disbanded without combat and which Dugdale, in their view, erroneously called a siege. P.J.C. Field suggests that the first public record of this Malory in 1439 is an indication of when he reached the date of his majority (at the age of 21).

Scholars consider the question of this timeline to be important in determining authorship, as the original timeline would place Malory's birth in the early to mid 1390s. He would therefore have been at least 75 when Le Morte was completed, as he must have been at least in his late teens or early 20s at the time of his commission: his peers of the same rank in Dugdale's record were in their mid- to late-twenties. According to the alternate timeline, his birth would have been around 1415–1418 and his age would have been a much more reasonable 55 to 58 years when Le Morte was completed.

William Matthews emphasizes the importance of Malory's age thus: "There is considerable evidence that the medieval view was that by sixty a man was bean fodder and forage, ready for nothing but death's pit... it might be best to find out how old the Warwickshire knight really was in 1469." Researching the question, Matthews made an original discovery: Sir William Dugdale's surviving 15th century notes and papers in the Bodleian Library on the Agincourt campaign contain a lengthy military roster (apparently in Dugdale's own hand) with the following detail:

Thomas Mallory est retenuz a j lance et ij archers pr sa launce ouve j archer xx li par an et bouche de court et pour lautre archer x marcs saunz bouche de court.

Because this original French note perfectly matches the English translation in Dugdale's published work, and because a number of the other knights listed on the same commission roster are known to have died long before 1436, Matthews concludes that these commissions cannot refer to the 1436 campaign; and therefore Thomas Malory of Newbold Revel must have been commissioned into Henry V's Agincourt campaign around 1414 or 1415, confirming Kittredge's original timeline and making this Malory in his mid-70s to early 80s at the time the book was completed. Matthews asserts, "seventy-five is no age at all to be writing Le Morte Darthur in prison."

Linton comes to Dugdale's defense, disputing the need for an alternative timeline. She notes that scholars have accepted Dugdale's account of this Malory without question, except for the matter of his age. She agrees with other scholars that Dugdale knew the Malorys of Newbold Revel and suggests that he would have certainly made the connection between this Malory and Le Morte if there were any connection to be made.

Much more detail was added to Thomas Malory of Newbold Revel's biography by Edward Hicks in 1928, revealing that this Thomas Malory had been imprisoned as a thief, bandit, kidnapper, attempted murderer, and rapist; which hardly seemed in keeping with the high chivalric standards of his book. Helen Cooper referred to his life as one that "reads more like an account of exemplary thuggery than chivalry". Shortly before his death, C. S. Lewis stated that this issue was a grave one for readers of Le Morte d'Arthur.

E. K. Chambers emphasizes the importance of the problem by quoting the author himself:

"What?" seyde Sir Launcelot, "is he a theff and a knyht? and a ravyssher of women? He doth shame unto the Order of Knyghthode, and contrary unto his oth. Hit is pyte that he lyveth."

In Modern English:

"What?" said Sir Lancelot, "is he a thief and a knight, and a rapist of women? He does shame to the Order of Knighthood, contrary to his oath. It is a pity that he lives."

Chambers comments, "Surely the Sir Thomas of Monks Kirby [the parish in which Malory of Newbold Revel lived] could not have written this without a twinge."

Sir Thomas Malory of Newbold Revel was born to Sir John Malory of Winwick, Northamptonshire, who had served as a Justice of the Peace in Warwickshire and as a Member of Parliament, and Lady Phillipa Malory, heiress of Newbold. He was knighted before 8 October 1441, became a professional soldier, and served under Henry de Beauchamp, 1st Duke of Warwick. While it is not recorded how he became distinguished, he acted as an elector in Northamptonshire. However, in 1443 he and accomplice Eustace Barnaby were accused of attacking, kidnapping, and stealing 40 pounds' worth of goods from Thomas Smythe, though nothing came of this charge. He married a woman named Elizabeth Walsh, with whom he had at least one son, named Robert, and possibly one or two other children. Despite the criminal charges against him, he seems to have remained in good standing with his peers because in that same year, Malory was elected by the men of Warwickshire to Parliament to serve as a knight of the shire for the rest of 1443, and was appointed to a royal commission charged with the distribution of money to impoverished towns in Warwickshire. In 1449–50, he was returned as member of Parliament for Great Bedwyn, a seat controlled by the Duke of Buckingham.

Malory's status changed abruptly in 1451 when he was accused of ambushing Humphrey Stafford, 1st Duke of Buckingham, a prominent Lancastrian in the Wars of the Roses, along with 26 other men sometime in 1450. The accusation was never proved. Later in 1451, he was accused of extorting 100 shillings from Margaret King and William Hales of Monks Kirby, and then of committing the same crime against John Mylner for 20 shillings. He was also accused of breaking into the house of Hugh Smyth of Monks Kirby in 1450, stealing 40 pounds' worth of goods and raping Smyth's wife, and with attacking her again in Coventry eight weeks later. At this period, a charge of rape could also apply to some acts of consensual sex and some nonsexual crimes; several scholars have suggested that the accusation did not refer to rape as it is now defined. However, Field's analysis of the specific Latin terminology of the charges concludes that they were intended to refer to actual rapes.

On 15 March 1451, Malory and 19 others were ordered to be arrested. Nothing came of this and, in the following months, Malory and his cohorts were charged with a series of crimes, especially violent robberies. At one point, he was arrested and imprisoned in Maxstoke Castle, but he escaped, swam the moat, and returned to Newbold Revel. Nellie Slayton Aurner points out that most of these crimes seem to have been targeted at the property and followers of the Duke of Buckingham; and that as Malory was a supporter of the family of Buckingham's former rival, the Duke of Warwick, there may have been a political motive behind either Malory's attacks or Buckingham and others bringing charges against him. Aurner suggests that Malory's enemies tried to slander him, giving evidence that the Duke of Buckingham was Malory's long-time enemy.

Malory finally came to trial on 23 August 1451, in Nuneaton, a town in the heartland of Buckingham's power and a place where Malory found little favour as a supporter of the Beauchamps. Those accused included Malory and several others; there were numerous charges. Malory was convicted and sent to the Marshalsea Prison in London, where he remained for a year. He demanded a retrial with a jury of men from his own county. Although this never took place, he was released. By March 1452, he was back in the Marshalsea, from which he escaped two months later, possibly by bribing the guards and gaolers. After a month, he was back in prison yet again, and this time he was held until the following May, when he was released on bail of 200 pounds, paid by a number of his fellow magnates from Warwickshire. Malory later ended up in custody in Colchester, accused of still more crimes, involving robbery and the stealing of horses. Once again, he escaped and once again was apprehended and returned to Marshalsea Prison.

From Malory's first criminal charge in 1443 through his eighth charge in 1451 after several escapes from captivity, little was done to contain his actions. In 1451, a royal arrest order was issued, followed by increasing fines on the lords overseeing his imprisonment in case of his escape, culminating in a maximum fine of 2000 lbs set by the King's Bench in June 1455. As Malory aged through several subsequent imprisonments, fines for his escape decreased to 1000 lbs and then 450 lbs in January and October 1457, and then 100 lbs if not captured when he was somehow at large again despite no formal release in 1458. Malory was released as part of a general pardon at the accession of King Edward IV in 1461.

After 1461, few records survive which scholars agree refer to Malory of Newbold Revel. In 1468–1470, King Edward IV issued four more general pardons which specifically excluded a Thomas Malory. The first of these names Malory a knight; and applied to participants in a campaign in Northumberland in the North of England by members of the Lancastrian faction. Field interprets these pardon-exclusions to refer to Malory of Newbold Revel, suggesting that Malory changed his allegiance from York to Lancaster, and that he was involved in a conspiracy with Richard Neville, 16th Earl of Warwick to overthrow King Edward. Matthews, having shown that Malory of Newbold Revel was likely in his seventies by the time of the Northumberland campaign and living much further to the South, interprets this record as referring to a different candidate for authorship.

No record survives of Malory of Newbold Revel (or any other Thomas Malory) being in prison at the time Le Morte was completed. As Field describes, "Repeated scholarly searches of legal records have found no trace of arrest, charge, trial, or verdict" that would place any Thomas Malory in prison at the time documented by the author in the Winchester manuscript. Field suggests that Malory's political rivals "simply put him in prison without formal charge" and that he could have been released from prison in October 1470, at the collapse of the Yorkist regime and the temporary return to the throne of Henry VI.

In 1462, Malory settled his estate on his son Robert and, in 1466 or 1467, Robert fathered a son named Nicholas, Malory's grandson and ultimate heir. Malory died on 14 March 1471 and was buried in Christ Church Greyfriars, near Newgate Prison. His interment there suggests that his misdeeds had been forgiven and that he possessed some wealth. However, it was certified at the granting of probate that he owned little wealth of his own, having settled his estate on his son in 1462. Malory's grandson Nicholas eventually inherited his lands and was appointed High Sheriff of Warwickshire in 1502.

Dugdale, writing in the early to mid-17th century, recorded that the following inscription had been engraved on Malory's tomb: "HIC JACET DOMINUS THOMAS MALLERE, VALENS MILES OB 14 MAR 1470 DE PAROCHIA DE MONKENKIRBY IN COM WARICINI," meaning: "Here lies Lord Thomas Mallere, Valiant Soldier. Died 14 March 1470 [new calendar 1471], in the parish of Monkenkirby in the county of Warwick." The tomb itself had been lost when Greyfriars was destroyed in 1538 under King Henry VIII in the Dissolution of the Monasteries.

Linton, in her defense of Dugdale's account, notes that he never offered a connection between the Newbold Revel Malory and Le Morte, even though the book was well known in Dugdale's time.

=== Thomas Malory of Papworth St. Agnes ===
Thomas Malory of Papworth St. Agnes
- Born: 6 December 1425; Shropshire, England
- Died: c. September 1469; Huntingdonshire/Cambridgeshire, England

Shortly after Kittredge's original article on Malory of Newbold Revel, a second candidate was presented in an 1897 article in Athenaeum by A.T. Martin, who proposed that the author was Thomas Malory of Papworth St Agnes on the Huntingdonshire-Cambridgeshire border. Martin's argument was based on a will made at Papworth on 16 September 1469 and proved at Lambeth Palace on 27 October the same year. This identification was taken seriously for some time by editors of Malory, including Alfred W. Pollard, the noted bibliographer, who included it in his edition of Malory published in 1903.

This Thomas Malory was born on 6 December 1425 at Moreton Corbet Castle, Shropshire, the eldest son of Sir William Mallory, member of Parliament for Cambridgeshire, who had married Margaret, the widow of Robert Corbet of Moreton Corbet. Thomas inherited his father's estates in 1425 and was placed in the wardship of the King, initially as a minor, but later (for reasons unknown) remaining there until within four months of his death in 1469.

Richard R. Griffin later provided further support for this candidate in The Authorship Question Reconsidered. Published after Matthews's book promoting the Hutton Conyers candidate (as described below), Griffin makes several arguments; most notably that the Papworth candidate's dialect would match that of Le Morte more closely than either of the other candidates. As detailed below, a leading dialect expert identified the language of Le Morte as being most characteristic of Lincolnshire. Griffith points out that while the current candidate lived in Shropshire as a child and on the Cambridgeshire-Huntingdonshire border in adulthood, both his father and grandfather were from Lincolnshire; and that neither of the other two major candidates had any known connection to Lincolnshire.

Little else is known of this Malory, apart from one peculiar incident discovered by William Matthews. A collection of Chancery proceedings includes a petition brought against Malory by Richard Kyd, parson of Papworth, claiming that Malory ambushed him on a November evening and took him from Papworth to Huntingdon, and then to Bedford and on to Northampton, all the while threatening his life and demanding that he either forfeit his church to Malory or give him 100 pounds. The outcome of this case is unknown, but it seems to indicate that this Malory was something other than an ordinary country gentleman. However, while this candidate's father and several other close family members were knights, no clear evidence survives showing that this Malory was ever actually knighted.

=== Thomas Malory of Hutton Conyers ===
Thomas Malory of Hutton Conyers
- Born: c. 1425-1435; Yorkshire, England
- Died: Unknown

The third contender emerged in the mid-20th century: Thomas Malory of Hutton Conyers and Studley Royal in Yorkshire. This claim was put forward in 1966 in The Ill-Framed Knight: A Skeptical Inquiry into the Identity of Sir Thomas Malory by William Matthews, a British professor who taught at UCLA (and also transcribed the diary of Samuel Pepys). This contender is also championed by Linton.

Matthews makes many arguments for this candidate, with his main focus on linguistic clues both in the Winchester manuscript and the Caxton edition of Le Morte d'Arthur; including distinctive dialectal and stylistic elements such as alliteration that are characteristic of northerly writing. His claim drew scholarly attention including a review co-written by eminent medievalist E. F. Jacob and the famed linguist Angus McIntosh. Neither reviewer accepted Matthews's claims entirely. Jacob agrees that the dialect of Le Morte is not that of Warwickshire, deferring to McIntosh for a more detailed dialectal analysis while noting that Matthews makes a good case for reopening the question of Malory's identity. Linton, however, disputes several of McIntosh's arguments, presenting a data driven analysis of the dialect in the Morte. Besides this analysis, she dismisses some of McIntosh's arguments as trivial, noting quibbles between what dialect is northern and what is northerly, for example.

McIntosh's dialectal analysis states that: “To put the matter simply, the original Le Morte Darthur contained various forms which are too northerly for the everyday language of Newbold Revel”. While McIntosh does not specifically support Matthews' claim of an origin in the Hutton Conyers area of Yorkshire, he ultimately concludes that the language would have been "most at home" in Lincolnshire but is characteristic of roughly anywhere north of a line from Chester to the Wash (see inset map). He suggests that Malory “simply had access to, and was deeply steeped in, far more northerly romance material" than the specific texts which he is thought to have used.

Two central elements of Matthews's argument for the Hutton Conyers candidate include his evidence of the advanced age of the Newbold Revel candidate at the time of writing, described in that section above; and Matthews' analysis of the exclusion of a Thomas Malarie, knight from a general pardon issued in 1468. The question of the identity of the Malory listed in this document is widely regarded as critical to the final identification of the author. In Field's words: "the Sir Thomas Malory who was exempted from pardon must have been the author of the Morte. No other conclusion is possible." While Field's conclusion is widely accepted, Linton suggests he has attributed it to the wrong Malory, arguing that Malory of Hutton Conyers, a close associate of Neville, is the likely knight exempted from that pardon.

The pardon applied to a group of Lancastrians in a military campaign in the winter of 1462 in the Northern county of Northumberland near the Scottish border. Matthews shows that Thomas Malory of Hutton Conyers was closely related to the Humphrey Neville, knight listed just before him in the short list of those excluded. Matthews also points out that this Northern campaign was geographically much closer to Hutton Conyers in Yorkshire than to Newbold Revel, and concludes that the document referred to the Thomas Malory of Hutton Conyers - not to Malory of Newbold Revel, who was a Yorkist and would have been something in excess of 70 years old; far too old to have taken part in this Northern military campaign. Matthews therefore promotes this document as strong evidence that Malory of Hutton Conyers was indeed a knight after all and the author of the Morte. Linton offers additional evidence to illustrate the close connection between Humphrey Neville and Thomas Malory of Hutton Conyers.

Matthews's interpretation was not universally accepted, primarily because he could not find evidence that the Yorkshireman was a knight. Linton, however, has removed that principal objection, providing extensive detail about the Malorys of Yorkshire and offering evidence that Thomas of Yorkshire was a Knight Hospitaller, a knight of the church. She also examines the provenance of some of the known sources of the Morte and demonstrates that this Malory would have had ready access to these documents.

In spite of Matthews's strong evidence of the Newbold Revel knight's advanced age, Field has long argued that the 1468 exclusion from pardon refers to Malory of Newbold Revel and instead shows that that candidate changed his lifelong Yorkist loyalty to become a Lancastrian. It seems equally plausible, however, to realize that the Knight Hospitaller from Hutton Conyers, who was close to Neville, was excluded from pardon, rather than to think the Newbold Revel knight changed political stripes.

Outside of the contested pardon-exclusion, Thomas Malory of Hutton Conyers was not recorded as having been a knight in the generally accepted secular sense, though his elder brother John and most of his recent forefathers were knights. If to accept Linton's argument that the Yorkshire Thomas was a Knight Hospitaller, the primary objection to his authorship is removed and the contradictions presented by the Newbold Revel knight become irrelevant.

=== Thomas Malory of Wales ===
Even only a few years after the original publication of Le Morte, there was speculation as to Malory's identity. The earliest identification was made by John Bale, a 16th-century antiquarian, who declared that Malory was Welsh, hailing from Mailoria on the River Dee. This theory received further support from Sir John Rhys, who proclaimed in 1893 that the alternative spelling indicated an area straddling the border between England and North Wales, Maleore in Flintshire and Maleor in Denbighshire. On this theory, Malory may have been related to Edward Rhys Maelor, a 15th-century Welsh poet. It was also suggested by antiquary John Leland that he was Welsh, identifying "Malory" with "Maelor". However, most modern scholars have disregarded this early work on the basis that no such place as Mailoria has ever been identified on the Dee or elsewhere; no Welsh Thomas Malory appears in the surviving historical record; and Malory identified himself as English rather than Welsh.

== Works ==
Malory's Le Morte d'Arthur (The Death of Arthur) is the source of the modern form of most Arthurian mythology, and is the only major work of English literature between Geoffrey Chaucer, around a century earlier, and Shakespeare, around a century later. It has been called the first English novel. Malory's main sources for his work included Arthurian French prose romances, mainly the Vulgate (Lancelot-Grail) and Post-Vulgate cycles, Geoffrey of Monmouth's Historia Regum Britanniae (History of the Kings of Britain), and two anonymous English works called the Alliterative Morte Arthure and the Stanzaic Morte Arthur.

The entire work is eight romances that span twenty-one books with 507 chapters, which was said to be considerably shorter than the original French sources, despite its vast size. Malory was responsible for organizing these diverse sources and consolidating them into a cohesive whole. The work was originally titled The Whole Book of King Arthur and of His Noble Knights of the Round Table, but printer William Caxton changed it to Le Morte d'Arthur (originally Le Morte Darthur) before he printed it in 1485, as well as making several other editorial changes. According to one theory, the eight romances were originally intended to be separate, but Caxton altered them to be more unified.

There has been some argument among critics that Malory's Le Morte d'Arthur was primarily intended as a political commentary of Malory's own era. Malory portrays an initially idyllic past under the strong leadership of King Arthur and his knights, but as intrigue and infighting develop, the utopic kingdom collapses, which may have been intended as a parallel and a warning against the infighting taking place during the Wars of the Roses. The seemingly contradictory changes in King Arthur's character throughout the work have been argued to support the theory that Arthur represents different eras and reigns throughout the tales. This argument has also been used to attempt to reconcile Malory's doubtful reputation as a person who continually changed sides with the unexpected idealism of Le Morte d'Arthur. It remains a matter of some debate whether this was a deliberate commentary or an imaginative fiction influenced by the political climate. All these arguments depend upon acceptance of the Newbold Revel Malory as the author.

The sources of the romances that make up Le Morte d'Arthur, and Malory's treatment of those sources, correspond to some degree with those of a poem called The Wedding of Sir Gawain and Dame Ragnelle; they also both end with a similarly worded prayer to be released from imprisonment. This has led some scholars in recent years to believe that Malory may have been the author of the poem.

== Modern culture references ==
A young Malory himself appears as a character at the end of T. H. White's book The Once and Future King (1958), which was based on Le Morte d'Arthur. This cameo is included in the Broadway musical Camelot (1960), and in its film adaptation (1967), where his name is given as "Tom of Warwick"; reflecting the general acceptance of Malory of Newbold Revel (in Warwickshire) as the author through most of the 20th century, despite the criminal history of that candidate in his later life.

Less direct homage characters to the writer include Mallory, the eponymous ancient wizard rival of Merlin and follower of Morgana featured in the backstory of the animated series Princess Gwenevere and the Jewel Riders episode "The Wizard of Gardenia" (1996), and Sir Malory, a non-player character and Mordred-like brother of Morganthe included in the video game Wizard101 world expansion Avalon (2012). A fictionalised discovery of Malory's book and its acquisition by William Caxton form key elements in The Load of Unicorn (1959), a children's novel by Cynthia Harnett.

== Sources ==
- Cooper, Helen, Le Morte Darthur: The Winchester Manuscript (OUP 1998) ISBN 0-19-282420-1
- Malory, Thomas, Cowen, Janet & Lawlor, John. Le Morte D'Arthur. Volume II. Harmondsworth: Penguin Books, 1969.googlebooks Retrieved 2 December 2007
- Vinaver, Eugène, "Sir Thomas Malory" in Arthurian Literature in the Middle Ages, Loomis, Roger S. (ed.). Oxford: Clarendon Press, 1959. ISBN 0-19-811588-1
- Spisak, James W. Caxton's Malory: A New Edition of Sir Thomas Malory's Le Morte Darthur. Berkeley and Los Angeles, CA: University of California Press, 1983.
- Field, P. J. C., The Life and Times of Sir Thomas Malory, Cambridge: D. S. Brewer, 1993. ISBN 978-0-85991-385-0
- ——— "Malory, Sir Thomas (1415x18–1471)", Oxford Dictionary of National Biography, Oxford University Press, 2004; online edn, May 2011 [1 Jan 2013] (requires login)
- Smith, Sheila V. Mallory, A History of the Mallory Family, Phillimore, 1985, ISBN 0-85033-576-0
- Hardyment, Christina, Malory: The Life and Times of King Arthur's Chronicler, HarperCollins, 2005, ISBN 0-06-620981-1
- Hicks, Edward (1928). Sir Thomas Malory: His Turbulent Career. Cambridge (Mass): Harvard University Press. Archived from the original on 21 February 2013 – via Questia.
- Riddy, Felicity. Sir Thomas Malory. Leiden: E. J. Brill, 1987. Print.
- Whitteridge, Gweneth. "The Identity of Sir Thomas Malory, Knight-Prisoner". The Review of English Studies; 24.95 (1973): 257–265. JSTOR. Web. 30 November 2009.
- Malory, Thomas & Matthews, John. Le Morte d'Arthur. London: Cassell & Co, 2000.
- Matthews, William. The Ill-Framed Knight: A skeptical inquiry into the identity of Sir Thomas Malory, University of California Press, 1966 archive.org
- Linton, Cecelia Lampp. The Knight Who Gave Us King Arthur: Sir Thomas Malory, Knight Hospitaller. Front Royal, VA: Christendom College Press. 2023. ISBN 979-8-9868157-2-5.
