= Martin Powell (puppetry) =

Irish puppeteer

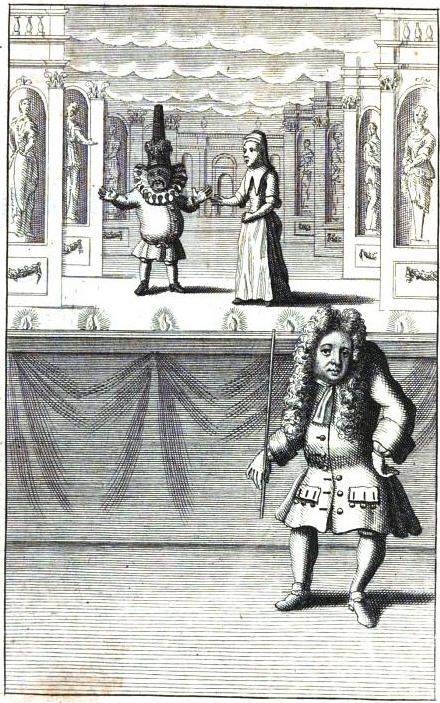
Early Punch and his wife (then called Joan), with Martin Powell, frontispiece of Burnet's A Second Tale of a Tub (1715)

Martin Powell, (fl. 1709–1720; d. 1729) was an Irish master puppeteer and puppet show impresario, who put on a repertoire of satirical and parodical marionette shows that invariably featured the Punch character. He drew audiences first at provincial towns such as Bath, then moving his venue to London. His theatre (dubbed "Punch's Opera" or "Punch's Theatre") established itself in early 1710 at its first location, at the north end of St. Martin's Street intersected by Litchfield St., not quite in Covent Garden. But by 1711 he relocated the theatre to the galleries of Covent Garden, at Little Piazza, opposite St. Paul's Church.

He has been credited with establishing the stock form of the Punch and Judy plays. Charles Magnin, the learned author of the Histoire des Marionnettes en Europe, calls the years of Powell's pre-eminence "the golden age of marionettes in England." It has been commented "Powell is described as a deformed cripple but his powers of satire were considerable," to the extent that the ministry recruited Powell to lampoon the French prophets to diminish their influence among the populace. He not only narrated (spoke the lengthy prologues), with a wand in hand, but was a puppeteer himself, and he is thought to have built his own puppet figures and written the plays himself.

A 20th-century scholar assesses the period of Powell's prominent activity to be 1709–1720, the popularity of his puppetry having waned in the latter years, "his son briefly carried on the tradition in the [1720s]", and he died 1729. (Note: DNB gives "fl. 1709–1729")

== Repertoire ==
=== Bath ===
In Bath (1709), Powell had his success with, e.g., The Creation of the World, which in its Noah's Flood segment featured "Punch and his wife dancing in the Ark." (Note: Tatler No. 16 describes The Creation of the World as the work of an anonymous puppeteer; later (Tatler No. 44) this puppetter from "a former paper" is divulged to be "Mr. Powel" [sic.] (Shershow 1995, p. 139).) The Creation of the World, was also later put on by Powell at Bartholomew Fair.Shershow 1995, p. 113 This puppet show was not exclusive to Powell at the time, and a puppeteer known as "Crawley" staged it at Southwark Fair in 1695, and later at Bartholomew Fair in 1727.

- The Children in the Wood, was "presumably performed at Bath".
- Mother Shipton, together with The Seven Champions of Christendom and Valentine and Orson.

=== Covent Garden ===
Once in London, in an escalated rivalry with Her Majesty's Theatre in Haymarket (i.e., with serious dramas and operas), he arranged various puppet operas, including:

- "King Bladud, Founder of the Bath" (1711)
- The City Rake (The Town Rake, or Punch turn'd Quaker) (1711)
- The History of Sir Richard Whittington ("The True and Ancient History of Sir Richard Whittington, Thrice Lord Mayor of London, and his Cat") (1711)
- Friar Bacon and Friar Bungay (1711)
- "Poor Robin's Dream, or the Vices of the Age Exposed" (end of April, 1711?)
- Faustus' Trip to the Jubilee (1712 (Note: Source such as Ward assign a 1710 date to "Dr. Faustus".)) – Spoof of Dr. Faustus
- The False Triumph; or, The Destruction of Troy' (1712)
- The State of Innocence, or the Fall of Man. (1712)
- The Unnatural Brother, or the Orphan Betrayed (1712)
- Orpheus and Erudice (1712)
- Beauteous Sacrifice (1712) – new play but really a remake of Creation
- Venus and Adonis, or the Triumphs of Love: a mock opera (1713)
- Mother Lowse (Mother Louse) (1714) (Note: DNB lists Mother Goose but apparently a misquote from Burnet.)

== Response ==
One contemporary observer who often wrote following Martin Powell's career was Richard Steele, as an editor of the 1709–1710 journal Tatler, or the Lucubrations of Isaac Bickerstaff and later of the 1711 journal Spectator. In the Tatler, Steele assumed the persona of Isaac Bickerstaff, Esquire, writing a (feigned) affront that Powell was mocking Bickerstaff through the puppet Punch. Not much here can be taken at face value, since the venom against Powell is in jest (characterized "bantering allusions"), the purported letter written by Powell to the editor is a "fictitious" fabrication, and in the subtext it is really about a veiled defense of his friend Benjamin Hoadly in his church and state dispute against Ofspring Blackall, Bishop of Exeter.

Following up the bantering allusions to Powell in the Tatler, Richard Steele, in the Spectator (No. 14), made the under-sexton of St. Paul's, Covent Garden, write to complain that his congregation took the warning of his bell, morning and evening, to go to a puppet show set forth by one Powell under the piazzas. "I have placed my son at the piazzas to acquaint the ladies that the bell rings for church, and that it stands on the other side of the garden; but they only laugh at the child." Another correspondent writes describing Powell's show, which he compares favourably with the opera at the Haymarket; "for whereas the living properties at the Haymarket were ill trained, Powell has so well disciplined his pig that in the first scene he and Punch dance a minuet together".

When the fanatics called French prophets were creating disturbances in Moorfields, the ministry ordered Powell to make Punch turn prophet, which he did so well that it soon put an end to the prophets and their prophecies. In 1710, says Lord Chesterfield, the French prophets were totally extinguished by a puppet show.

On 20 April 1710 Luttrell mentions that four Indian sachems who were visiting London went to see Powell's entertainment. In the Groans of Great Britain (1711), formerly considered to be Daniel Defoe's work, Charles Gildon (d. 1724) complains of Powell's popularity, and states that his wealth was sufficient to buy up all the poets of England. "He seldom goes out without his chair, and thrives on this incredible folly to that degree that, were he a freeman, he might hope that some future puppet show might celebrate his being Lord Mayor as he hath done Dick Whittington." Steele, who saw Powell as late as 1729, states that he made a generous use of his money.

Martin Powell's shows lost popularity in within a matter of few years, and dropped out into obscurity after a mention in the anonymous pamphleteer ballad, Bartholomew Fair: An Heroi-Comical Poem (1717).

In 1715, Thomas Burnet wrote a brief biography entitled A Second Tale of a Tub, or History of Robert Powell the Puppet Showman. The substitution of Robert for Powell's real name, Martin, was made to render the obvious satire upon Robert Harley, Earl of Oxford more effective.
