= Whittington Stone =

1964 statue of a cat in London, England

Coordinates: 51.5665°N 0.1369°W

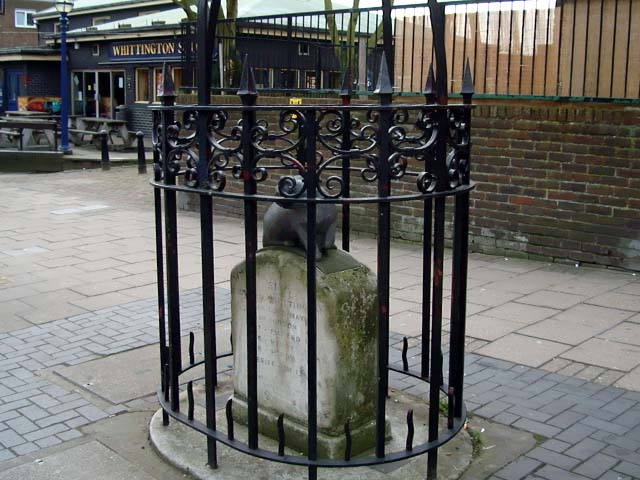
Monument and Pub

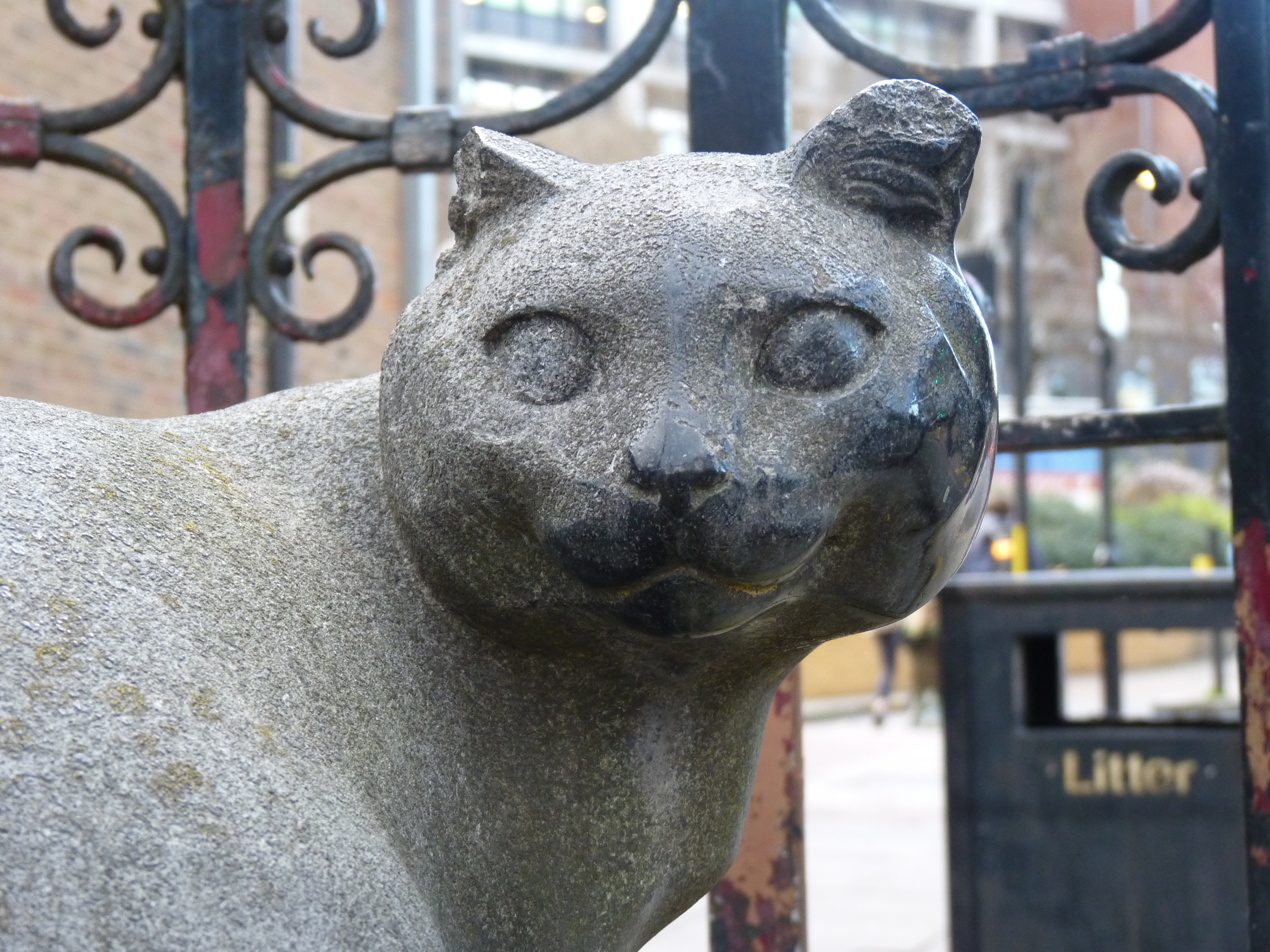

The Whittington Stone is an 1821 monumental stone and statue of a cat at the foot of Highgate Hill, a street, in Archway. It marks roughly where it is recounted that a forlorn character of Dick Whittington, loosely based on Richard Whittington, returning to his home from the city of London after losing faith as a scullion in a scullery, heard Bow Bells ringing from 4 1/2 miles (7.2 km) away, prophesying his good fortune leading to the homage "Turn again Whittington, thrice Lord Mayor of London!" This quotation and a short history of the man cover two faces of the stone. The pub next to it is of the same name.

== Details ==
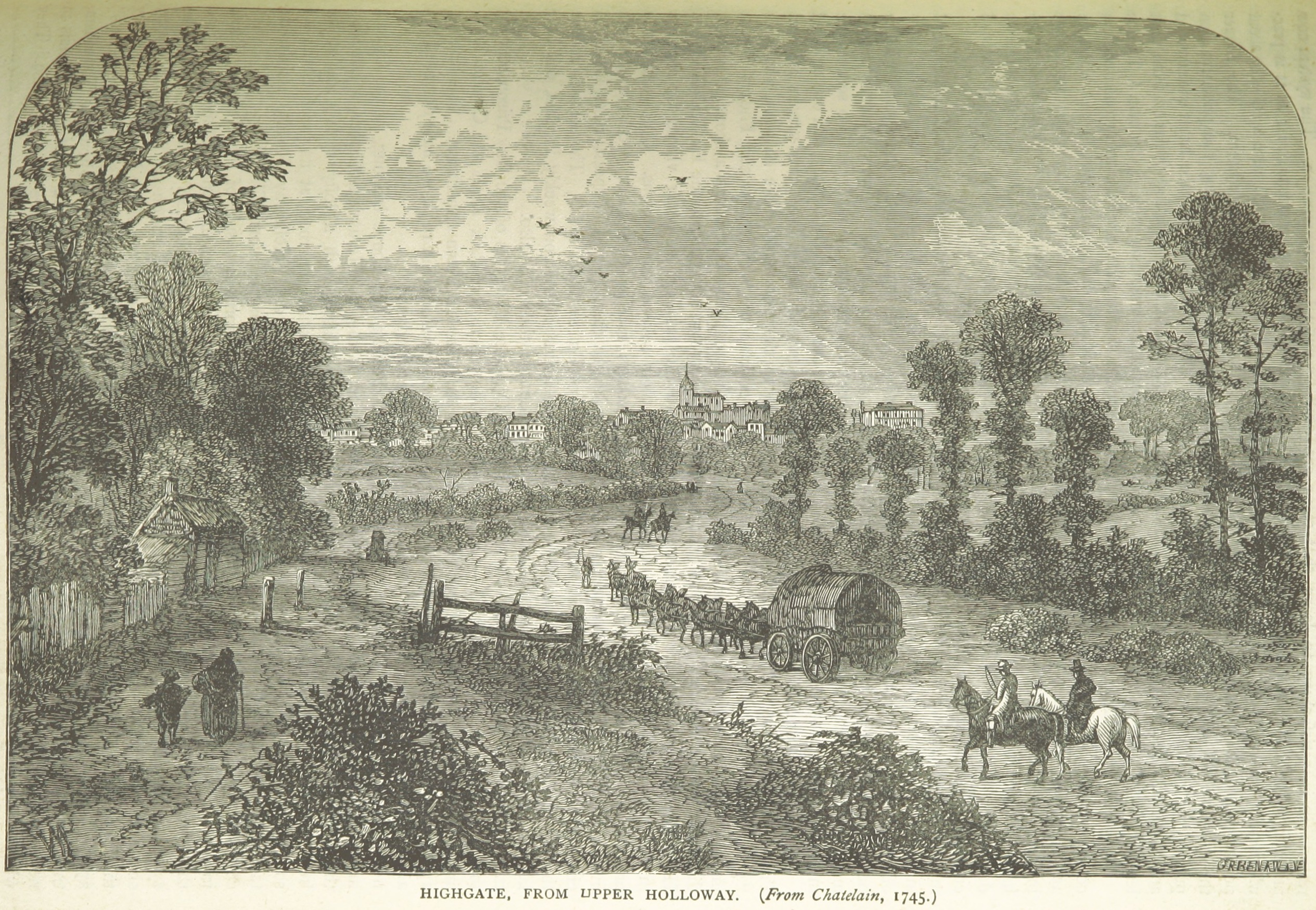
The place where Whittington's Stone stands, or stood, in which the stone appears as the base or plinth of a cross, with part of the pillar still remaining, as drawn by Chatelain in 1745

The large tablet was erected in 1821, restored in 1935, and the cat sculpture was added in 1964. It is a two-segment slab of Portland stone, "the inscription to the south-west side now almost completely eroded, that to the north-east [tells] the career of the medieval merchant and City dignitary Sir Richard Whittington (c.1354–1423), including his [three/four] terms as Lord Mayor". The memorial marks the site where 'Dick Whittington', returning home discouraged after a disastrous attempt to make his fortune in the city, heard the bells of St Mary-le-Bow ring out, 'Turn again Whittington, thrice Lord Mayor of London.' On top is the 1964 sculpture of a cat by Jonathan Kenworthy, in polished-black Kellymount limestone. Iron railings, oval in plan, with upper flourishes and spearhead finials above and an intersecting circular return (an "overthrow"), surround it. The stone and railings are negligibly raised by a small broad stone plinth mainly set into the surrounding pavement. It has had statutory protection as listed, in the initial grade II category, since 1972.

The location of the stone was considered the northern part of Upper Holloway, until some decades after the nearby arched bridge was built in the early 19th century.

== Other legacies ==
Aside from cultural references including a nursery rhyme, story and plays, the Lord Mayor was praised for ensuring the building of a maternity hospital and drains for the poor of London during his lifetime. He left his wealth to a broad-based charity which continues into the 21st century helping people in need.
