= Beau Bell (disambiguation) =

Beau Bell may refer to

- Beau Bell, a fairy in some pantomime productions of Dick Whittington and his Cat.
- Beau Bell (1907 – 1977), American baseball player
- Beau Bell (American football) (b. 1986), American gridiron football player.
