= George Ali =

American actor

- Born: George Bolingbroke; October 27th, 1866; Washington, D.C., United States
- Died: April 26th 1947 (aged 80-81); Freeport, Long Island, New York, USA
- Occupations: Actor, Animal impersonator
- Years active: 1899-1947
- Spouse: Helen Jerome

George Ali (born George Bolingbroke; c.1866 − April 26, 1947) was an actor who specialized in the "skin game", playing animals in stage and cinema productions, known as an animal impersonator.

== Early life ==
George was born in 1866 to Irish immigrants in Washington DC. He was the youngest of his family and while growing up he took an interest in animation. In May 1879 he graduated from New York University and continued to live in New York until his death.

== Career ==
Ali performed in a number of stage plays, working as lions, tigers, and bears, but it was as the canine nursemaid Nana and the Crocodile in the 1924 film adaptation of Peter Pan for which he seems best remembered. Barrie had written the part expecting it to be played by a boy, but adults were cast for the technically demanding role. Ali played the character at the age of 58.

Ali's performance as Nana was highly acclaimed, of particular note the manipulation of Nana's mouth and eyes, performed by maneuvering the head's puppeteering features from within, using them to pick up towels and carrying spoons, all whilst walking on all fours.

Ali was a skilled puppeteer and gymnast, yet it remains unknown if Ali also had a hand in creating his costumes. In the early days of film and television, it was not uncommon for makeup artists and stuntmen to create and perform their own special effects characters. It is said that he also played the part of the Crocodile as well.

Ali died April 26, 1947, in Freeport, Long Island, NY.

== Filmography ==
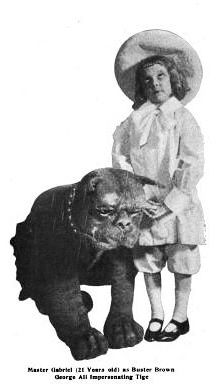
George Ali as Tige (left), in the 1905 Broadway production of Buster Brown.

- Peter Pan (as Nana/Crocodile)

=== Theatre productions ===
- Parade (as The Jackass)
- Chee-Chee (as San Toy)
- White Wings (as Joseph)
- Buster Brown (as Tige)
- The Jersey Lily (as Pretty Polly)
- Dick Whittington and His Cat (as Mouser the Cat)
- George W. Lederer's Mid-Summer Night Fancies (as Mr. Black Bear)
- The Wild Rose (as Baby)
- Hoity Toity (as Baron Barbon)
- Depleurisy (as Antoine)
- A Man From Mars (as A Trolley Victim)
- Fiddle-dee-dee (as Leo)
- Quo Vass Iss? (as Sparrus Copus)
- Arizona (as Ham Song)
- Exhibit II (as Tipit)
- Whirl-i-gig (as Performer)
- Tom, Tom, the Piper's Son (as Performer)
