= The Load of Unicorn =

1959 children's historical novel by Cynthia Harnett

- Front cover of first edition
- Author: Cynthia Harnett
- Illustrator: Cynthia Harnett
- Language: English
- Genre: Children's historical novel
- Publisher: Methuen & Co.
- Publication date: 1959
- Publication place: United Kingdom
- Media type: Print (hardcover & paperback)
- Pages: 239 pp (first edition)
- OCLC: 752626144
- LC Class: PZ7.H228 Lo PZ7.H228 Cax

The Load of Unicorn is a children's historical novel written and illustrated by Cynthia Harnett. It was first published in 1959, and then republished by Egmont Classics in 2001. It is set in London in 15th century, and concerns the adventures of an apprentice of William Caxton, the printer. The title refers to a load of paper with a unicorn watermark, ordered by Caxton from Flanders but never delivered.

G. P. Putnam's Sons published the first U.S. edition in 1960 as Caxton's Challenge. It has also been published as The Cargo of the Madalena.

Harnett and The Load of Unicorn were a commended runner up for the Carnegie Medal from the Library Association, recognising the year's best children's book by a British subject. (Note: Since 1995, there are usually eight books on the Carnegie shortlist. According to CCSU, some runners up through 2002 were Commended (from 1954) or Highly Commended (from 1966). There were about 160 commendations of both kinds in 49 years including five for 1959.)

== Plot summary ==
Benedict, known as Bendy, has been apprenticed by his forward-looking father to the printer William Caxton. This infuriates his mean half-brothers who are scriveners and fear that the new-fangled printing press will drive them out of business. They have secretly waylaid the printer's delivery of new paper and are hiding it. Bendy knows about it but is worried about the consequences of telling, especially as his half-brothers may be involved with Lancastrian rebels.

Caxton sends Bendy and another apprentice on a quest to find the complete manuscript of Thomas Mallory's stories of King Arthur. Mallory's stories had been circulating as a series of independent and internally consistent tales, but Caxton believes there is a single manuscript, based on the fact that some of the tales make clear reference to earlier episodes. Bendy's quest proves dangerous as others are also on the trail.

== Allusions to history ==
There are many details about life in London in 15th century and especially about the craft of printing, all meticulously researched. In the author's postscript, she explains the process of researching and writing the book, and compares then and 1959. The endpapers of the first and some later editions are printed with 15th-century maps of London, and the illustrations show many of the everyday objects of the time.
