= Great House, Llanarth =

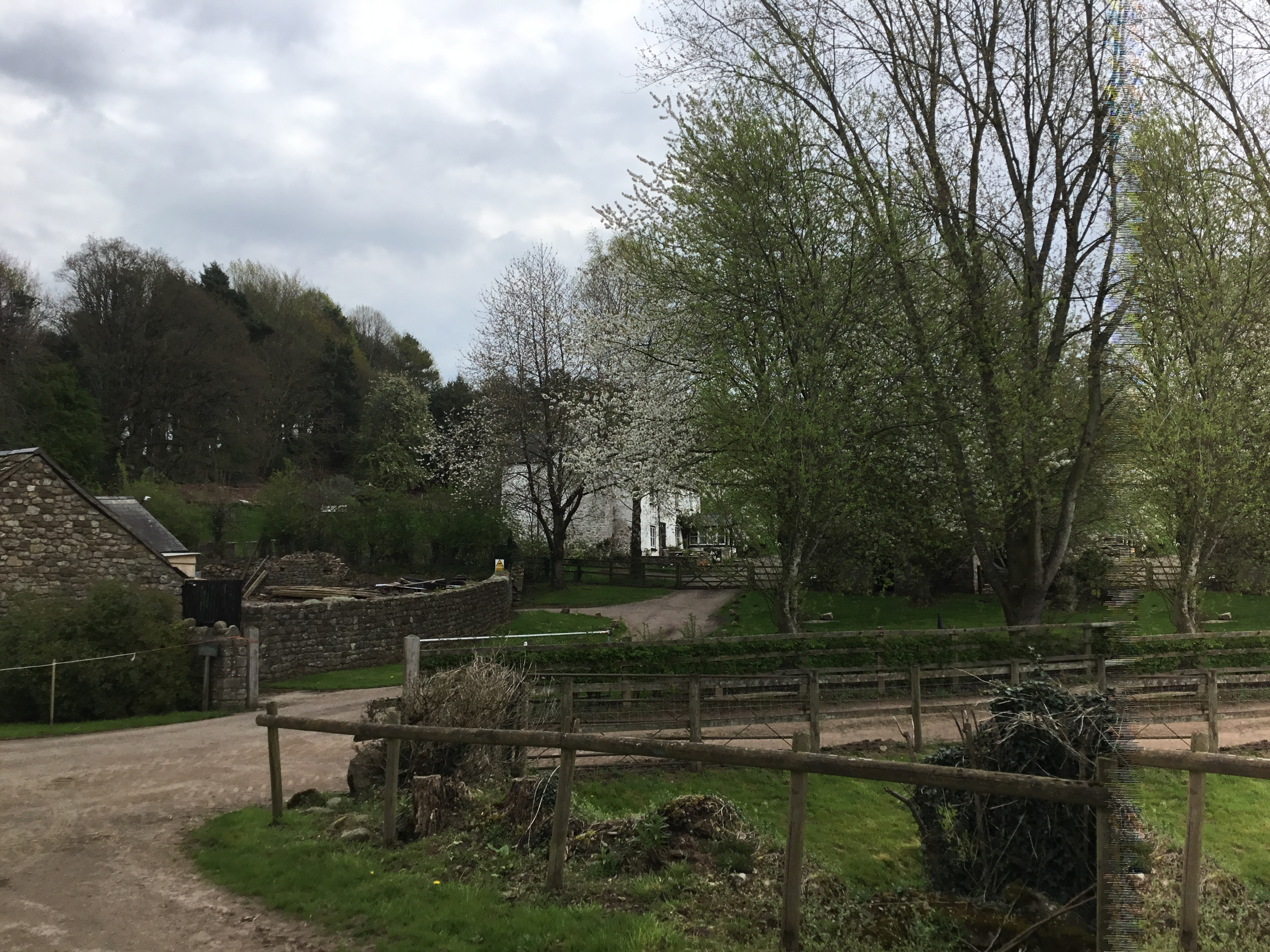
- "an impressively intact late 16th/17th century farmhouse"

- Location within Monmouthshire
- 51.7679°N 2.9261°W
- Type: Farmhouse
- Location: Llanarth, Monmouthshire

History
- Built: late-16th century

Site notes
- Architectural style: Vernacular
- Governing body: Privately owned

Listed Building – Grade II*
- Official name: Great House
- Designated: 15 March 2000
- Reference no.: 22999

Listed Building – Grade II
- Official name: Barn range at Great House, Clytha
- Designated: 15 March 2000
- Reference no.: 23000

Great House, Llanarth, Monmouthshire is a farmhouse dating from the late-16th century. Extended in the mid-17th century and little altered thereafter, it is a Grade II* listed building. The detached barn range has its own Grade II listing.

== History ==
The architectural historian John Newman dates the original house to the late 16th century. Sir Cyril Fox and Lord Raglan, in their three-volume study, Monmouthshire Houses, note that the original house, of a two-room plan which Cadw dates to 1580, was extended c.1620 to create a parlour. The house was again extended and modernised "before (Fox and Raglan's inspection in) 1942". In a tithe map of 1845, the house, together with 127 acres, is recorded as part of Sir Samuel Fludyer's Trostrey Court estate and was being farmed by a William Griffiths. Now part of the Pontypool Park Estate, the farm remains privately owned.

== Architecture and description ==
Constructed of white washed rubble, and of two storeys with attics, the house has a substantial stair-turret to its western end. Fox and Raglan note that the staircase wing had, until the Second World War, "a complete set of door frames which added to the dignity of the house". The house has a Grade II* listing, Cadw's record describing it as "an impressively intact farmhouse". The barn and stable block facing Great House, date from the 18th and 19th centuries respectively, and has its own Grade II listing.

== Sources ==
- Fox, Cyril; Raglan, Lord (1994). Renaissance Houses, Part 3. Monmouthshire Houses. Cardiff: Merton Priory Press Ltd & The National Museum of Wales. ISBN 1-898937-00-1. OCLC 776066469.
- Newman, John (2000). Gwent/Monmouthshire. The Buildings of Wales. London: Penguin. ISBN 0-14-071053-1.
