= Peter Pan (1924 film) =

1924 film by Herbert Brenon

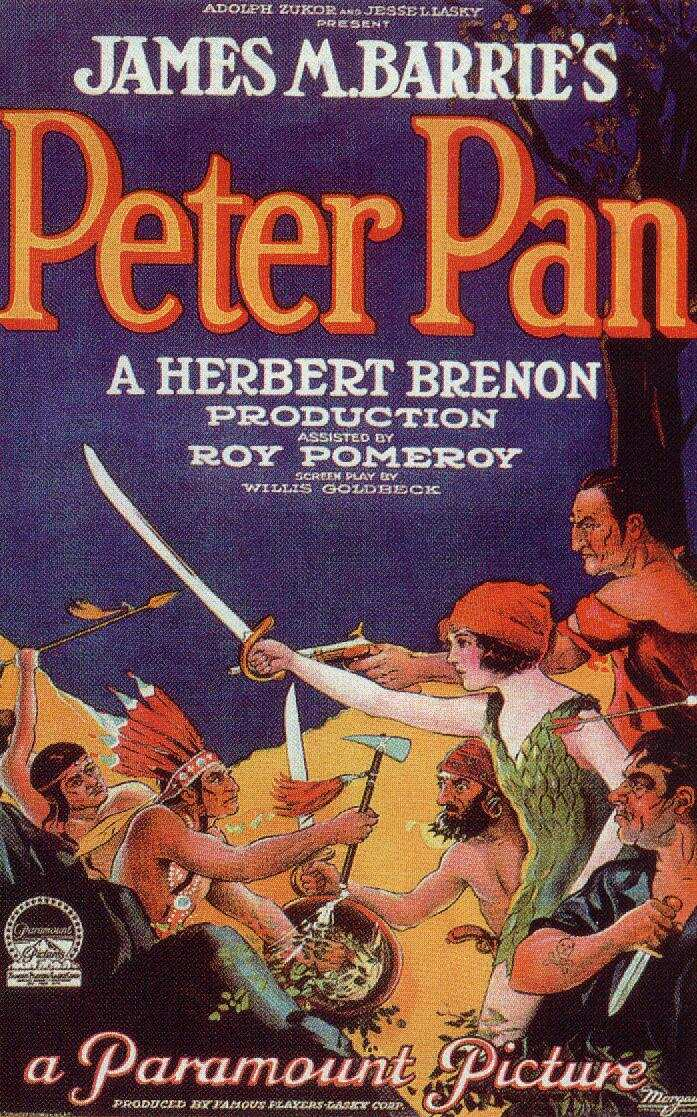
- Original film poster
- Directed by: Herbert Brenon
- Written by: Willis Goldbeck
- Based on: Peter and Wendy by J.M. Barrie
- Produced by: Famous Players–Lasky
- Starring: Betty Bronson; Ernest Torrence; Mary Brian; Virginia Brown Faire; Esther Ralston; Anna May Wong
- Cinematography: James Wong Howe
- Distributed by: Paramount Pictures
- Release date: December 29, 1924
- Running time: 105 minutes
- Country: United States
- Language: Silent (English intertitles)
- Budget: $40,030
- Box office: $630,229

Peter Pan (full film)

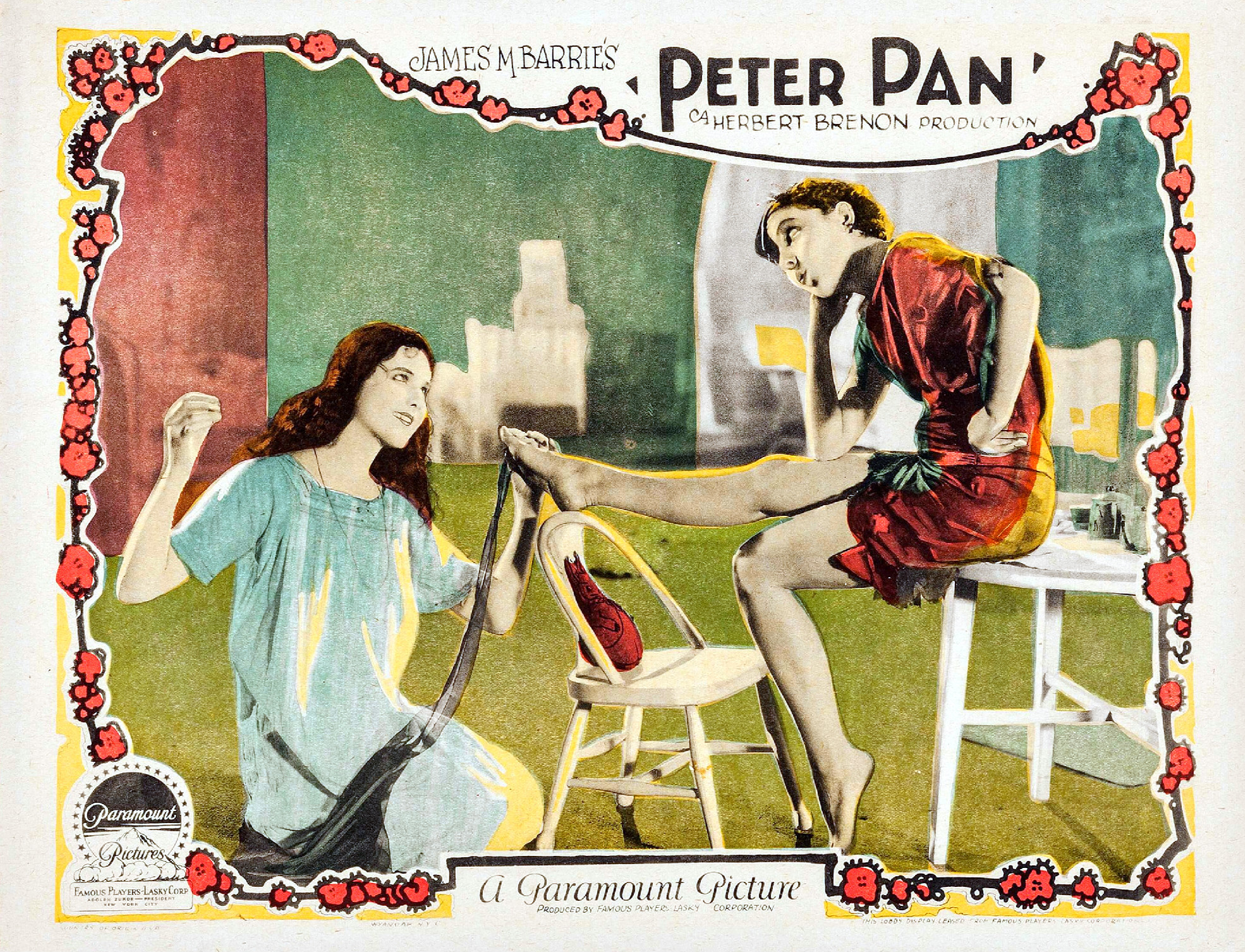
Mary Brian as Wendy Darling and Betty Bronson as Peter Pan

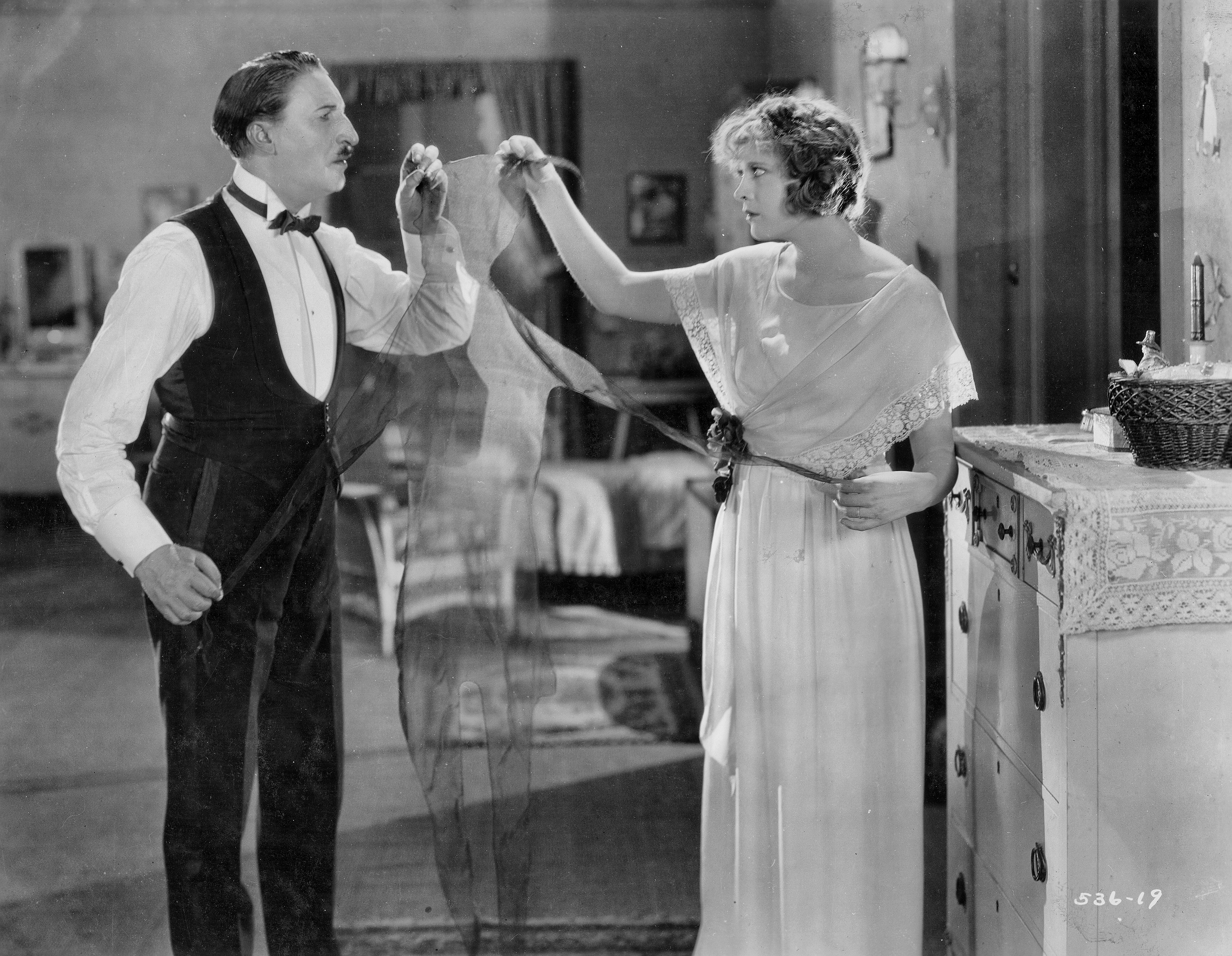
Cyril Chadwick and Esther Ralston as Mr. and Mrs. Darling

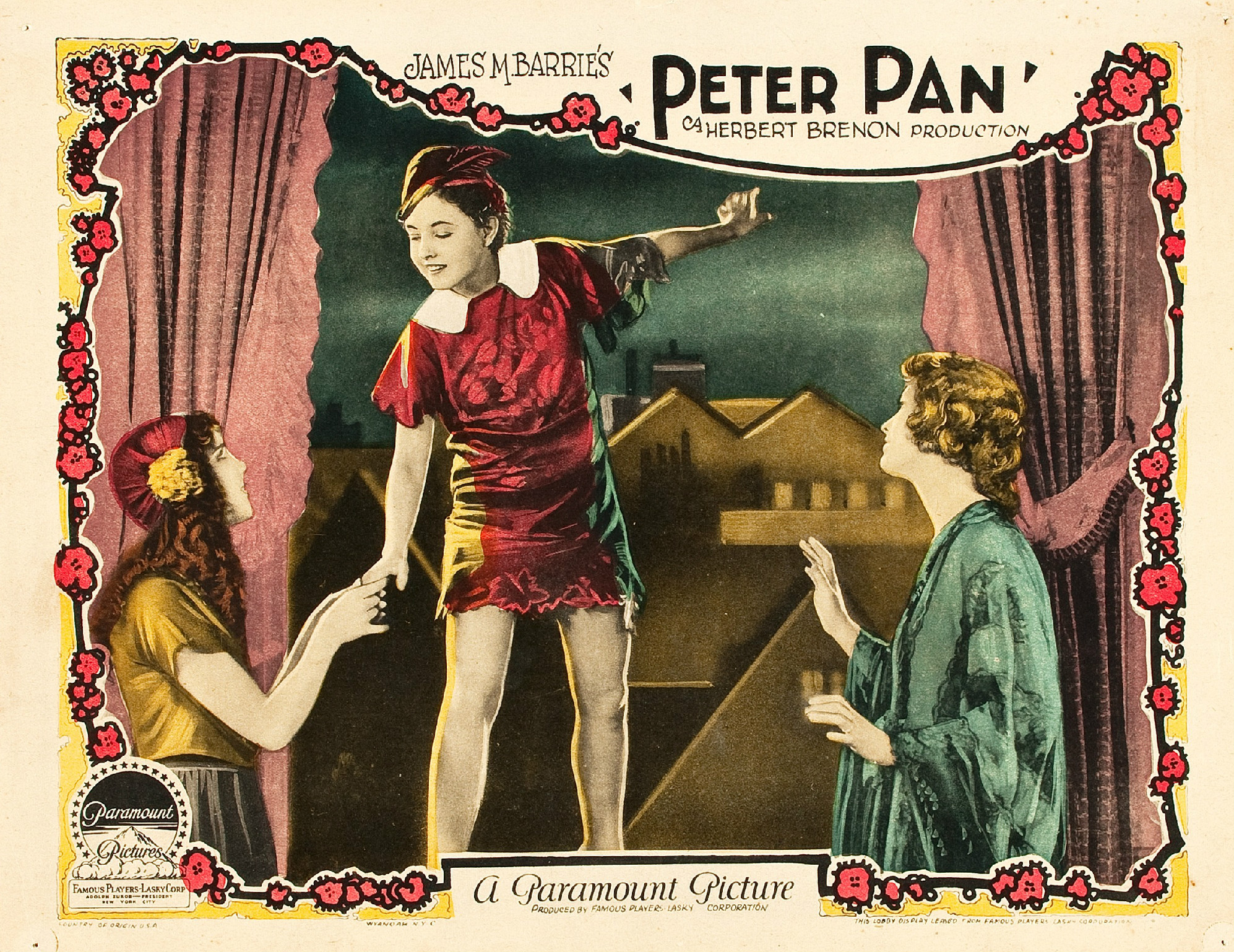
L-R: Mary Brian, Betty Bronson and Esther Ralston

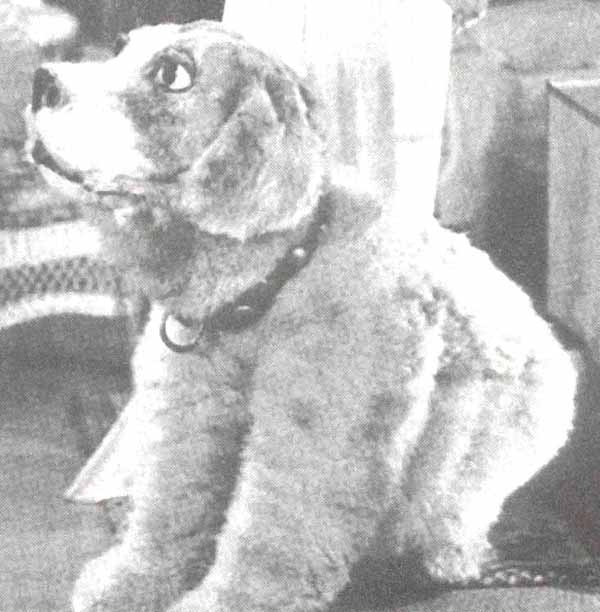
George Ali as Nana the dog

Peter Pan is a 1924 American silent fantasy adventure film released by Paramount Pictures, and the first film adaptation of the 1904 play by J. M. Barrie. It was directed by Herbert Brenon and starred Betty Bronson as Peter Pan, Ernest Torrence as Captain Hook, Mary Brian as Wendy, Virginia Browne Faire as Tinker Bell, Esther Ralston as Mrs. Darling, and Anna May Wong as the Native American princess Tiger Lily. The film was seen by Walt Disney, and inspired him to create his company's 1953 animated adaptation.

== Plot ==
Mrs. Darling is worried because she has seen a boyish face at the nursery window and found a shadow on the floor, but reluctantly goes to a party with her husband. Because Mr. Darling is so strict, the family cannot keep a nurse, so the three children are left in the charge of the dog Nana.

Soon Peter Pan appears at the window with the fairy Tinker Bell, and he finds his shadow in a desk drawer. Wendy, the oldest child, awakens and sees Peter, and he tells her of his home in the woods and about the fairies. Peter teaches the children to fly and they go away to Never Never Land to join the colony of Lost Boys. Tinker Bell is jealous and prompts one of the Lost Boys to shoot Wendy, thinking she is a bird, and she almost dies.

The boys, who live in an underground home, adopt Wendy as their mother. A band of Neverland Indians, led by Peter's friend Tiger Lily, battle a band of pirates led by Captain Hook, but are defeated. The Captain hates Peter, who cut off his hand and fed it to a crocodile, which Hook then fed an alarm clock so that its ticking will warn him of its approach. The pirates carry off the children and leave poison in Peter's medicine. Tinker Bell drinks the poison and almost dies, but is saved when the children in the audience say that they believe in fairies.

Peter enlists the aid of mermaids to get aboard the pirate ship and, with the help of the Lost Boys, they defeat the pirates. Wendy and the children then fly back home. Wendy wants to keep Peter, but he says he never wants to grow up. Mrs. Darling agrees to allow Wendy to go back to Never Never Land once a year to help Peter with his spring cleaning, and he leaves to go back to the home in the woods. Mr. and Mrs. Darling adopt all of the Lost Boys.

== Cast ==
- Betty Bronson as Peter Pan
- Ernest Torrence as Captain Hook
- Mary Brian as Wendy Darling
- Jack Murphy as John Darling
- Philippe De Lacy as Michael Darling
- Virginia Brown Faire as Tinker Bell
- George Ali as Nana the dog and Crocodile
- Esther Ralston as Mrs. Darling
- Cyril Chadwick as Mr. Darling
- Anna May Wong as Tiger Lily
- Maurice Murphy as Tootles
- Mickey McBan as Slightly
- George Crane Jr. as Curly
- Winston Doty as 1st Twin
- Weston Doty as 2nd Twin
- Terence McMillan as Nibs
- Louis Morrison as Gentleman Starkey
- Edward Kipling as Smee
- Robert Milasch as Kelt

== Production ==
The film closely follows the plot of the original play, and even goes so far as to incorporate much of its original stage dialogue in the intertitles. Added scenes include Nana the dog pouring out Michael's medicine and giving him a bath, and Nana bursting into the home at which a party is being given, to warn Mr. and Mrs. Darling that Peter Pan and the Darling children are flying around the nursery.

Like the original play and several other versions, and unlike the 1953 Disney film, the 1924 version makes it clear that Wendy harbors a romantic attachment to Peter, but Peter only thinks of her as his mother. The film omits the scene An Afterthought, which Barrie wrote after the play was staged, and in which Peter returns for Wendy, only to find that years have passed and that she is now a married woman with a daughter. Barrie selected Bronson for the role of Peter.

== Release and restoration ==
Peter Pan was first released in the United States on December 29, 1924. The distributor was Paramount Pictures. In Germany, where the premiere took place in December 1925, the distributor was UFA.

Since there was no national film archive in the United States and Paramount had no interest in a long-term distribution of the film – distributors held movies only as long in the program as they earned money – most copies of Peter Pan were destroyed over the years.

For decades, the film was thought to be lost. In the 1950s James Card, film restorer and curator of George Eastman House in Rochester, New York, discovered a well-preserved copy in a vault at the Eastman School of Music, and made a preservation of that source. Film historian David Pierce discovered an additional and hitherto unknown 16mm copy at the Disney Studios which had been made when the company acquired the rights to the property in 1938. A new restoration was undertaken by the George Eastman House combining the two sources in 1994, and Philip C. Carli composed new film music for it, which was premiered by the Flower City Society Orchestra at the 1996 Pordenone Silent Film Festival.

== Reception ==
The film was celebrated at the time for its innovative use of special effects (mainly to show Tinker Bell) according to Disney's 45th anniversary video of their adaptation of Peter Pan. In 2000, this film was deemed "culturally, historically, or aesthetically significant" by the United States Library of Congress and selected for preservation in the National Film Registry.

The review aggregator website Rotten Tomatoes reports an approval rating of 98% based on 42 reviews, with an average rating of 7.9/10. The website's consensus reads, "Armed with technical ingenuity and classic source material, Peter Pan brings J.M. Barrie's beloved fantasy to the screen in dazzling style."

The film is recognized by American Film Institute in these lists:

- 2003: AFI's 100 Years...100 Heroes & Villains:
  - Captain Hook – Nominated Villain

== See also ==
- The House That Shadows Built (1931 promotional film by Paramount with excerpt of this film)
- List of rediscovered films
