= Trostrey =

Coordinates: 51.73423°N 2.9284°W

Trostrey: Welsh: Trostre
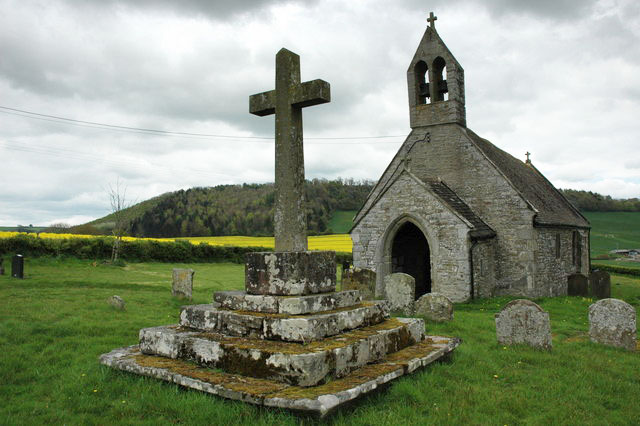
- St David's Church

- Location within Monmouthshire
- OS grid reference: SO 360 044
- Principal area: Monmouthshire
- Preserved county: Gwent
- Country: Wales
- Sovereign state: United Kingdom
- Post town: USK
- Postcode district: NP15
- Dialling code: 01291
- Police: Gwent
- Fire: South Wales
- Ambulance: Welsh
- UK Parliament: Monmouth

Trostrey (Welsh: Trostre) is a small hamlet and parish in Monmouthshire, in southeast Wales located about 2 1/2 miles (4.0 km) north/northwest of Usk.

== History ==
Excavations at the castle in 2000 found evidence of burial cairns from the Neolithic and Bronze Age periods. An 11th-century earthen motte-and-bailey castle was replaced in the 13th century by a small stone fort. A manor house, Trostrey Court stands 1/2 mile (0.80 km) east of the village. The Church of St David is dedicated to St David.
