= Great House, Llanover =

Great House
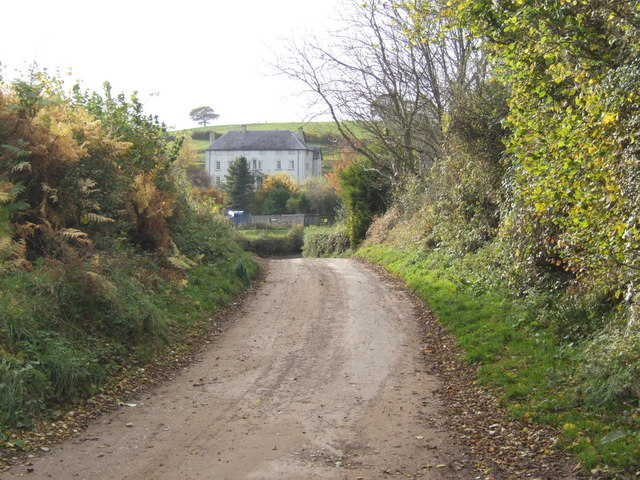
- "an exceptionally interesting and remarkable country house"

- Location within Monmouthshire
- 51.7967°N 2.9647°W
- Type: House
- Location: Llanover, Monmouthshire

History
- Built: late-16th century

Site notes
- Architectural style: Vernacular
- Governing body: Privately owned

Listed Building – Grade II*
- Official name: Great House
- Designated: 9 January 1956
- Reference no.: 2785

Great House, Llanover, Monmouthshire (Note: The description of Great House, and of its location, can be confusing. Cadw records it as being in the Community of Llanover, although it lies to the north of the A40 road while the village of Llanover lies to the south. The architectural historian John Newman places it in Penpergwm, while including it in the entry for Llangattock-Juxta-Usk. There are also a number of houses called Great House throughout Monmouthshire, some of which, including Great House, Llanover, are sometimes referred to by the Welsh name, Tŷ Mawr.) is a country house dating from the late-16th century. Extended in the mid-18th century and little altered thereafter, it is a Grade II* listed building.

== History ==
Cadw records the original house as being built in the late Elizabethan era, c. 1590–1610. The architectural historian John Newman attributes the mid-18th century rebuilding to the Lucas family, either the father Robert, who was "buying land aggressively in the 1730s", or his son, Richard. Cadw, following Sir Joseph Bradney, the Monmouthshire antiquarian, concludes that the son, High Sheriff of Monmouthshire in the 1760s, was the more likely builder. The Royal Commission on the Ancient and Historical Monuments of Wales Coflein database records the evidence of contemporary formal gardens. Further reconstruction took place in the Victorian era although Cadw acknowledges that it is hard to establish what was done. By the mid-20th century, the house was derelict, with a lengthy reconstruction beginning in the 1980s.

== Architecture and description ==
Constructed of local rubble, the whole house was extended and rendered in the 18th century rebuilding. The main block, now of two storeys with attics, was originally fully three storeys in height. The "galumphing" porch and roof are Victorian additions. The interiors contain "rich decorative fittings" from the 17th, 18th and 19th centuries. The footprint of the original 16th century house is now difficult to determine, although Newman concludes it must have been "of considerable size (and) baffling plan". The house has a Grade II* listing.

== Sources ==
- Newman, John (2000). Gwent/Monmouthshire. The Buildings of Wales. London: Penguin. ISBN 0-14-071053-1.
