= Guillaume Philippe Benoist =

French engraver

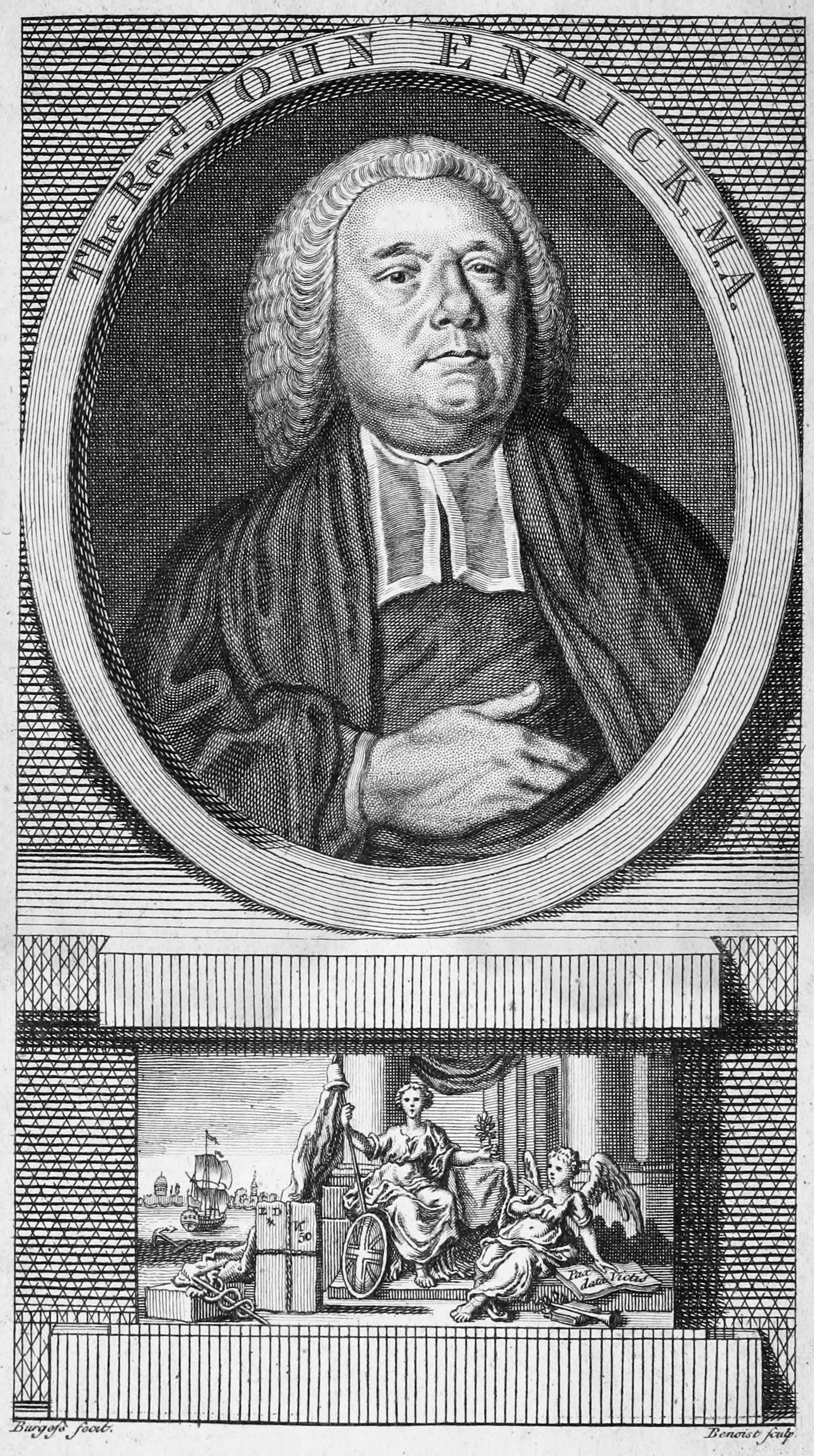
John Entick, portrait from 1763.

Guillaume Philippe Benoist (1725–70) was a French engraver, who spent the later part of his life in England.

== Life ==
Benoist was born near Coutances, Province of Normandy, in 1725. He lived in London during the later part of his life, and died there in 1770. He engraved some portraits, and a few other subjects. Writing in the late 18th century, Joseph Strutt noted that "he chiefly confined himself to small plates, which he executed in a fine style, though with little taste."

== Works ==
The following plates are by him:

=== Portraits ===
- Galileo Galilei after F. Villamena.
- The President de Montesquieu.
- Alexander Pope.
- Rosen de Rosenstein, physician.
- Sir Isaac Newton.
- Blaise Pascal.
- Albert Haller.
- Mlle. Clairon, actress.
- Jacques Andre Joseph Aved, painter after Aved.

== Subjects ==
- Jupiter and Juno after Giuliano di Parma.
- Bathsheba bathing after Bonnieu.
