= The Great House (novel) =

Book by Cynthia Harnett

- First edition (publ. Methuen Publishing)
- Author: Cynthia Harnett
- Publisher: Methuen Publishing
- Publication date: March 1, 1968

The Great House is a children's historical novel by Cynthia Harnett. It was first published in 1949 with illustrations by the author.

The novel is set in 1690 and concerns the building of a grand house in the new style, contrasted with the older manor house, which still reflects its medieval origins. The architectural differences are representative of the social changes of the period.
