= Ring Out Bow Bells! =

First edition (publ. Methuen)

Ring Out Bow Bells! is a children's historical novel by Cynthia Harnett. It was first published in London in 1953, and in New York as The Drawbridge Gate in 1954. In 1984 a US edition was published under the title of The Sign of the Green Falcon. It is the story of a boy called Dickon who had wanted to be a Grocer Apprentice. According to the book, Dickon despised the Mercer Guild, especially after a fight with Kurt Bladebone, a feared and strong Mercer apprentice. Later, he "unfortunately" finds he will be a Mercer apprentice which was his most terrible fear. It turned out, for him, that being a mercer apprentice is more fun than he thought. It is based in the time of Henry V, when Dick Whittington had had his third time as Lord Mayor of London.
