= Cynthia Harnett =

English author and illustrator (1893–1981)

Cynthia Harnett (22 June 1893 – 25 October 1981) was an English author and illustrator, mainly of children's books. She is best known for six historical novels that feature ordinary teenage children involved in events of national significance, four of them in the 15th century. They are characterised by meticulous background research and vivid evocation of history.

For one of them, The Wool-Pack (1951), she won the Carnegie Medal from the Library Association, recognising the year's best children's book by a British subject. Another, The Load of Unicorn (1959), was a commended runner-up for the Carnegie Medal. (Note: Since 1995 there are usually eight books on the Carnegie shortlist. According to CCSU some runners-up were Commended (from 1954) or Highly Commended (from 1966). There were about 160 commendations of both kinds in the 49 years to 2002, including five for 1959.)

== Life ==
Cynthia Harnett was born in London and studied at Chelsea School of Art. She illustrated the early editions of several of her own novels, but she also collaborated more than a dozen times with the painter and etcher George Vernon Stokes (1873–1954). Several of their books about dogs, the countryside or both credit Stokes and Harnett as co-authors.

== Works ==
With (George) Vernon Stokes

- In Praise of Dogs: An Anthology in Prose and Verse (Country Life, 1936), compiled by C.M. Harnett, illustrated by George Vernon Stokes
- David's New World: The Making of a Sportsman (Country Life, 1937)
- The Pennymakers (Eyre & Spottiswoode, 1937)
- Junk, the Puppy (Blackie & Son, 1937)
- Banjo the Puppy (1938)
- Velvet Nasks (Medici Society, 1938), illus. Vernon Stokes
- To Be A Farmer's Boy (Blackie & Son, 1940)
- Mudlarks (Collins, 1940)
- Mountaineers (Collins, 1941)
- Ducks and Drakes (Collins, 1942)
- The Bob-Tail Pup (Collins, 1944)
- Sand Hoppers (Collins, 1946)
- Getting to Know Dogs (Collins, 1947), illus. Vernon Stokes
- Two and a Bit (Collins, 1948)
- Follow my Leader (Collins, 1949)
- Pets Limited (Collins, 1950)

Historical novels

These six books were published by Methuen and the first five were illustrated by Harnett.

- The Great House (1949) —set in London and the countryside in the 17th century
- The Wool-Pack (1951) —set in the Cotswolds in 1493
- Ring Out Bow Bells! (1953) —set in London in 1415
- Stars of Fortune (1956) —set in 1554, about the Washington family, of Sulgrave Manor in Northants, England; and their stars-and-stripes coat of arms; ancestors of George Washington
- The Load of Unicorn (1959) —set in London in 1482
- The Writing on the Hearth (1971), illus. Gareth Floyd —set in the 1430s

In the U.S. these six books were first published as The Great House (1968), Nicholas and the Wool-Pack (1953), The Drawbridge Gate (1953), Stars of Fortune (1956), Caxton's Challenge (1960), and The Writing on the Hearth (1973). At least three were re-titled again in the 1980s.

Others

- The Green Popinjay (Blackwell, 1955)
- A Fifteenth-Century Wool Merchant (Oxford, 1962)
- Monasteries & Monks (B. T. Batsford, 1963), illus. Edward Osmond
