= Trostrey Court =

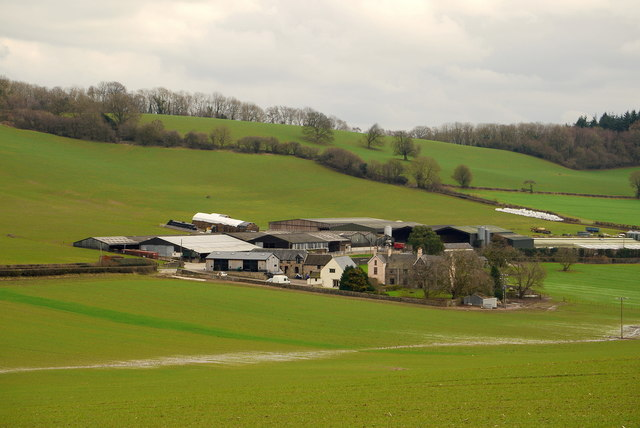
- "an important and early history"

- Location within Monmouthshire
- 51.7347°N 2.9201°W
- Type: House
- Location: Trostrey Monmouthshire

History
- Built: c.1580

Site notes
- Architectural style: Vernacular
- Governing body: Privately owned

Listed Building – Grade II*
- Official name: Trostrey Court
- Designated: 4 March 1952
- Reference no.: 2641

Trostrey Court House, Trostrey, Monmouthshire is a late 16th century gentry house. The current building replaced an earlier medieval court. The house played a role in the English Civil War when it was seized by the forces of Thomas Fairfax during the siege of Raglan Castle. In the 18th century the estate was sold to Valentine Morris, owner of nearby Piercefield House. In the 19th century the court was owned by the Fluyders, but let to tenant farmers. It remains a private house and working estate. The court is a Grade II* listed building.

== History ==
The current house dates from the 1580s, and was built by a John David Powell, to replace the earlier, medieval manor house which stood on the site. The Powells subsequently took on the surname Jones and a descendant, Jane Jones, married Charles Hughes of Moynes Court, near Chepstow. Charles Hughes was a prominent Cavalier and Trostrey was taken by General Thomas Fairfax during the siege of Raglan Castle in 1646. In the mid-18th century, the estate was sold to Valentine Morris, a sugar planter who lived at the, much grander, Piercefield House. Morris held the court for only a short time before debts forced him to mortgage it to Sir Samuel Fludyer in the 1770s. The Fluyders owned the court for the next one hundred years but never lived there, letting it to tenant farmers.

In the 20th century, the court was bought by the Morgans, and, still run as a working farm and private estate, is owned by their descendants. The current owner, David Morgan MBE is the president of the Usk Rural Life Museum.

== Architecture and description ==
The current house replaced an earlier manor. The house is constructed to a T-plan, and is built of rubble with slate roofs. The three-storey porch dates from the early 17th century and is described by the architectural historian John Newman as "most remarkable". The building is of two-storeys, with attics. The exterior of the house has been rendered and repointed and the windows replaced in the late 20th century. Newman considers the result, "none too attractive".

The interior contains significant 17th century wood panelling, including in the interior of the porch. In the 18th century wing of the court, a bedroom chamber is reported to house a priest hole behind the fireplace. The court is a Grade II* listed building, the Cadw designation noting its "important and early history...(and its)...fine panelling".
