= Lori Matsukawa =

American television news journalist (born 1956)

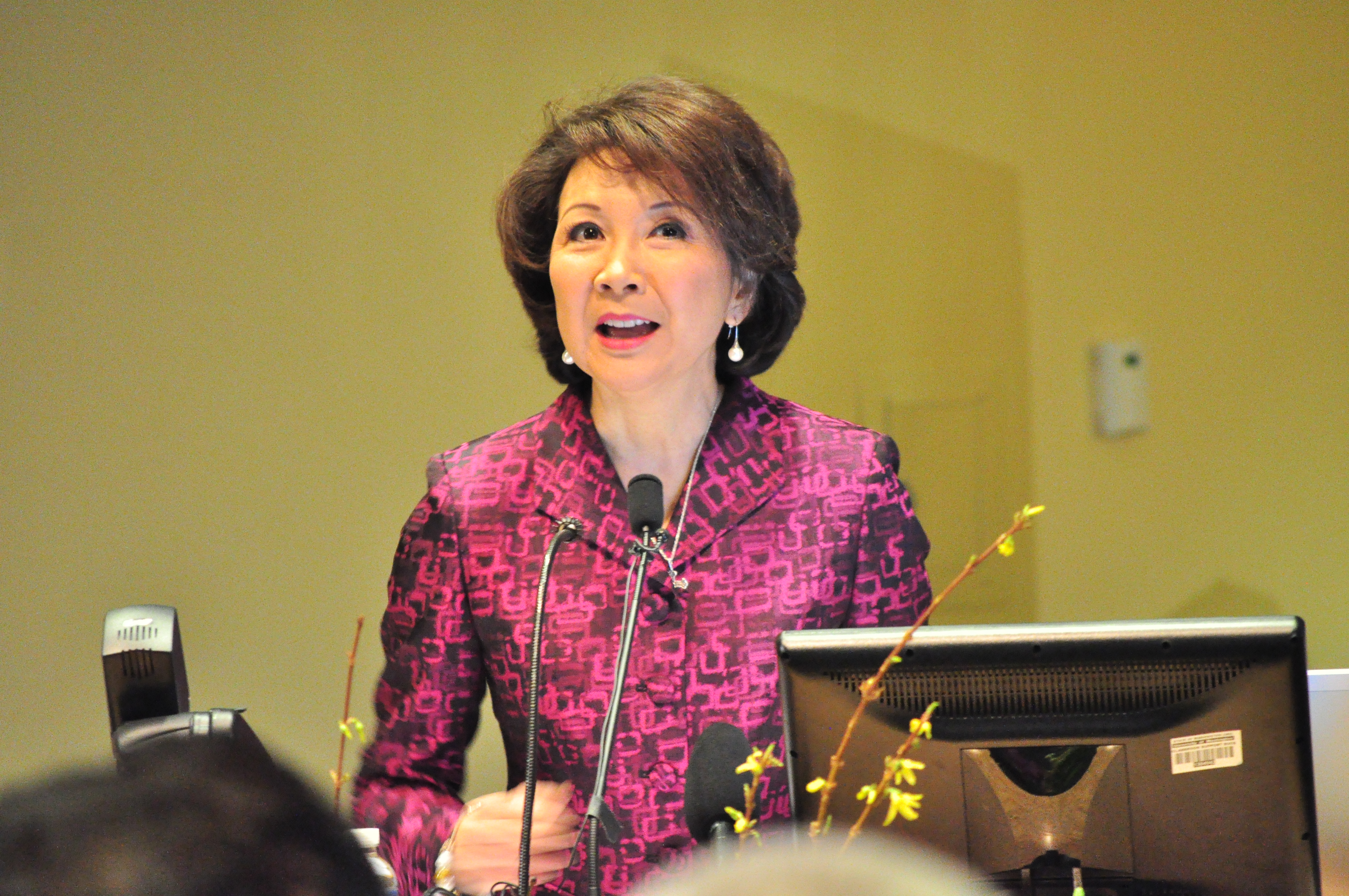
Matsukawa in 2014

Lori Matsukawa (born 1956) is an American television news journalist who spent thirty-six years as evening news anchor at KING 5, the NBC affiliate in Seattle. She has won two Emmys and numerous honors from regional and national organizations for her broadcasts, which have covered everything from the imprisonment of Japanese Americans in World War II to the Olympic Games in Salt Lake City and Vancouver. She has been honored for her contributions to diversity in U.S. news media by the Asian American Journalists Association and was named Communicator of the Year by the Association for Women in Communications. In 2019, The Seattle Times newspaper featured her retirement on its front page. Her memoir, Being There: Memoir of an Asian American Journalist, will be published by Chin Music Press in April 2026.

== Early life ==
Matsukawa grew up in Aiea, Hawaii, near Pearl Harbor, with two sisters; their parents were both teachers. In high school, she became Miss Honolulu and won the Miss Teenage America pageant. As an undergraduate student at Stanford University, she interned for KPIX in San Francisco and at the Honolulu Star-Advertiser during summers back home. She also wrote for both the student paper and an Asian American student publication; her role models included Connie Chung, Tritia Toyota, and Wendy Tokuda, all broadcasters. She graduated from Stanford Phi Beta Kappa with a bachelor's degree in communication.

While at KRCR, she met and married Larry Blackstock, a news director. They have a son, Alex.

== Career ==
Matsukawa worked at KRCR, a Redding, California, station, then KPTV in Portland, Oregon, followed by three years at Seattle's KOMO TV, where one of her first stories was the 1980 eruption of Mount St. Helens. In 1983, she began what would become a four-decade career at KING 5, where she covered the tenure of Washington's first Asian American governor, Gary Locke, and two Olympic Games.

Matsukawa co-founded the Japanese Cultural and Community Center of Washington in 2003. She also helped start the Northwest Journalists of Color Scholarship, which has funded the journalism studies of students since 1986.

Her last broadcast was June 14, 2019. She called "Prisoners in Their Own Land", a 2017 series about Japanese American internment, aired on the 75th anniversary of Executive Order 9066 during World War II, "the exclamation point" on her career. The series won her a Northwest Regional Emmy Award, her first.

== Awards and honors ==
The Japanese American Citizens League on August 15, 2020, selected Matsukawa as a recipient of its highest public honor, the Japanese American of the Biennium Award.

In addition to her Northwest Regional Emmy Award for "Prisoners in Their Own Land," Matsukawa won a second Emmy for "Shane Sato: Portraits of Courage," a 2018 story about a photographer who chronicled Seattle Nisei veterans. She is a 2014 Silver Circle inductee by the National Academy of Television Arts & Sciences's Northwest Chapter and a 2005 hall of fame inductee of the University of Washington's communications department, from which she received a master's degree in 1996. That year the Northwest Asian Weekly Foundation named her an Asian-American Living Pioneer. She is also a recipient of the 2005 Lifetime Achievement Award by the Asian American Journalists Association, whose Seattle chapter she co-founded in 1985.

In 2009, she was named Communicator of the Year by the Association for Women in Communications.

In 2022, Matsukawa received Japan's Order of the Rising Sun, Gold and Silver Rays, for promotion of friendly relations between Japan and the United States.
