= Miss Teenage America =

Beauty pageant

- Formation: 1961
- Type: Beauty pageant (1961–79); Magazine contest (1981–98)
- Location: United States
- Official language: English
- Affiliations: Dr Pepper (–1981); Teen Magazine (1981–98)

Miss Teenage America was a United States beauty pageant started in 1961 as a pageant for high school girls. In the 1960s and 1970s, it was usually broadcast on the CBS network around November each year. The pageant was sponsored by Dr. Pepper. The original pageant ended after 1979, and the name rights were sold to Teen magazine, which transformed the event into a mail-in contest which evaluated grades and volunteer work. The event ended after the 1998 Miss Teenage America was crowned, and Teen Magazine itself ceased operations in 2009.

== History ==
From 1961–1967 Dallas, Texas hosted the national pageant, and it moved to Fort Worth, Texas from 1968–1973. Afterwards, different cities throughout the United States hosted the national pageant.

Unlike today's Miss Teen USA and Miss America's Teen, the pageant featured girls representing cities and not states. The contestants aged between 13 and 17. There was also a talent segment. The organizers experimented with the finalist formats until 1967, when it was fixed at eight finalists and then the top four. Finalists were always announced the night before the finals. Winners received a four-year college scholarship, a car from Chrysler or Dodge, cash, a personal appearance contract, as well as Dr. Pepper and American Airlines stock.

A 1976 book attributed to Bob Hope, Erma Bombeck and Judith Houghton was titled Miss Teenage America Tells How to Make Good Things Happen. The proceeds went into a scholarship fund for contestants. The organization also printed and sold punch out paper doll sets featuring the reigning queen.

Hosts over the years included Sally Field, Johnny Carson, Betty White, Allen Ludden, Bob Barker, and Dick Clark. In 1975, NBC broadcast it. Bob Hope hosted in 1976. Other notable hosts include Bud Collyer and John Davidson, and Richard Thomas. On February 15, 1979 the event was held at the Grand Ole Opry House in Nashville, Tennessee with Anson Williams hosting.

The pageant organization began to disintegrate in 1979. Instead of being televised nationally on a single network, the 1979 show was sold through syndication, playing on 64 different stations on 13 different nights, leaving little suspense as to who was going to win. Dr. Pepper suspended local contests in the hopes of getting a new national network deal, which did not occur.

Dr. Pepper sold the pageant rights to Teen magazine in 1981, who completely transformed the event into a mail-in contest which evaluated grades and volunteer work. The event ended after the 1998 Miss Teenage America was crowned, and Teen magazine itself ceased operations in 2009.

The unassociated Miss Teen USA pageant was essentially a TV replacement for Miss Teenage America, and first held in 1983.

== Original pageant ==
- Miss Teenage America 1962 - Diane Lynne Cox (Richmond, Virginia)
- Miss Teenage America 1963 - Darla Banks (Fresno)
- Miss Teenage America 1964 - Judy Doll (Akron, OH)*
- Miss Teenage America 1965 - Carolyn Mignini (Baltimore)
- Miss Teenage America 1966 - Colette Daiute (New York)
- Miss Teenage America 1967 - Sandy Roberts (Milpitas, California)
- Miss Teenage America 1968 - Stephanie Ann Crane (St. Louis)
- Miss Teenage America 1969 - Melissa Babish (Pittsburgh)
- Miss Teenage America 1970 - Debbie Patton (Odessa, Texas)
- Miss Teenage America 1971 - Rewa Walsh (Magnolia High School, Anaheim, California)
- Miss Teenage America 1972 - Mary Colleen Fitzpatrick (Lancaster High School, Lancaster, Ohio)
- Miss Teenage America 1973 - Melissa Marie Galbraith
- Miss Teenage America 1974 - Lori Matsukawa (Honolulu)
- Miss Teenage America 1975 - Karen Peterson (Toledo, Ohio)
- Miss Teenage America 1976 - Cathy Durden (Honolulu)
- Miss Teenage America 1977 - Becky Reid (Dallas)
- Miss Teenage America 1978 - Leslie Griffiths (Anchorage)
- Miss Teenage America 1979 - Lori Heeren (Sioux City, Iowa)

== Teen magazine ==
- Miss Teenage America 1983 - Amy Sue Brenkacz (Chicago)
- Miss Teenage America 1984 - Laura Baxter (Danville, California)
- Miss Teenage America 1985 - Janice Payne (Charleston, South Carolina)
- Miss Teenage America 1986 - Lisa Morgan (Chicago) (later was Miss Illinois USA 1991).
- Miss Teenage America 1987 - Karen Johanson (Palo Alto)
- Miss Teenage America 1988 - Diane Dovell (Columbus, Ohio)
- Miss Teenage America 1989 - Cathy Bliss
- Miss Teenage America 1990 - Jennifer Kissick (Carlsbad, California)
- Miss Teenage America 1991 - Elizabeth Nuckles (Fletchers Ridge, Virginia)
- Miss Teenage America 1992 - Samantha Zogg (San Diego)
- Miss Teenage America 1993 - Mary Nguyen (Fullerton, California)
- Miss Teenage America 1994 - Elizabeth Andre (Ames, Iowa)
- Miss Teenage America 1996 - Katie Beam (Broken Arrow, Oklahoma)
- Miss Teenage America 1997 - Brooke Allen (Wichita, Kansas)
- Miss Teenage America 1998 - Megan Weber (Zanesville, Ohio)

Miss Teenage America 1964, Judy Doll, gave up her crown on May 19, 1964, to get married on May 31, 1964, to George Wolfe, a junior at Central Michigan University. The first runner-up, Jeanine Zavrel of Washington, DC, was awarded the title.

== Former contestants ==
- Cybill Shepherd (Moonlighting) Miss Teenage Memphis, Tennessee,
- Karen Valentine (Room 222) Miss Teenage Santa Rosa, California, 1963 Miss Teenage America talent award
- Taylor Marsh (radio talk show host)
- Paula Zahn (newscaster) 1973 Miss Teenage Aurora, Illinois
- Jayne Modean (1970's teen model) Miss Teenage Clifton, New Jersey, 1974 Miss Teenage America Poise and Appearance award, $500 ($3,300 today) scholarship.
- Constance Ramos, (Extreme Makeover: Home Edition, HGTV's Color Correction) 1979 Miss Teenage Kansas City
