= Mary Nguyen =

American television journalist and Attorney (born 1976)

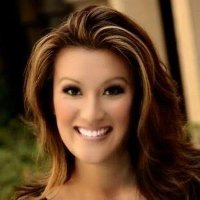
- Nguyen in 2013
- Born: April 6, 1976 (age 50); Los Angeles, California U.S.
- Education: University of California, Los Angeles (BA); Florida State University College of Law (JD)
- Occupation: Broadcast Journalist/Attorney
- Years active: 1999–present

Mary H. Nguyen-Nodelman (born April 6, 1976) is an American journalist and attorney. The investigative journalist and Emmy nominated reporter has worked at various ABC, NBC and Fox Television stations across the country.

== Early life and education ==
In 1993, Nguyen won Miss Teenage America. Petersen Publishing Company owned 'TEEN Magazine and as part Miss Teenage America's responsibilities, Nguyen was given a monthly column. The column was typically dedicated to stories about make-up, fashion, and beauty. However, "TEEN Magazine editors decided to change the column's structure and added an advice column component. There readers wrote to the magazine seeking advice and Nguyen addressed their teen concerns. In addition, Nguyen was a public speaker and travelled throughout the country speaking to teens and advocated against peer pressure, as well as drug and alcohol abuse. Subsequently, Nguyen was later published in the Los Angeles Times as a guest writer.

The state of California extended public recognition and commendation for Mary Nguyen's service by enacting Resolution 673. Ross Johnson, Chairman of California Fair Political Practices Commission and California State Senator Betty Karnette sponsored the resolution. It is a distinguished award thanking Nguyen's efforts on the country's "War on Drugs" initiative and peer pressure issues.

In 1999, she received her Bachelor of Arts degree in Communication Studies from the University of California, Los Angeles While at UCLA, Nguyen served as the President of UCLA's Society of Professional Journalists chapter. A Mark of Excellence Journalism award was given to Nguyen for her work in the journalism field while at UCLA.

Nguyen was an intern at the O.J. Simpson Trial and published an article in 'TEEN Magazine about her experience. Later she became a fellow at Center for American Politics and Public Policy Program and interned at 'Nightline in Washington DC. Nguyen later earned her Juris Doctor from Florida State University College of Law in Tallahassee, Florida.

== Career ==
Mary Nguyen started her career in 1999 in Waterloo, Iowa at KWWL-TV, the NBC affiliate. She later moved to Wichita, Kansas and worked at KAKE-TV, the ABC affiliate. Then in 2001, Nguyen began reporting in Little Rock, Arkansas at KATV-TV, the ABC affiliate. There, Nguyen covered politics and government including the extensive fundraising efforts led by the Clinton Foundation to build the 165 million dollar Clinton Presidential Center. In 2003, Nguyen started working as a reporter at WFTV, the ABC-affiliate television station in Orlando, Florida. Nguyen started to focus her efforts on reporting on the legal system, politics and government. Her reports showed the public that justice is served, criminals are punished and people are held accountable in the criminal and civil justice system.

However, in an era of classified document leaks, government data dumps, and increasingly antagonistic relationships between law enforcement and the media, Nguyen sought to expose unfairness in the system, either for victims or defendants, help prevent injustices by shining a spotlight on the actions of judges, lawyers and other participants in the justice system.

In 2009, she was nominated for an Emmy in the politics/government category for her investigation into the Orange County Jail Chief who was accused of misusing tax -payer funds. Mary broke international stories, which have fueled a public debate between two religions. In 2009, a Sri Lankan girl named Rifqa Bary, ran away from her home in Ohio to Florida. She claimed her Muslim parents were going to kill her for becoming a Christian.

Mary created change when she exposed how deputies at the Orange County Sheriff's Office were violating people's civil rights by their excessive use of force. Deputies were accused of tasing elementary school children, women who were pregnant, and suspects while they were restrained in handcuffs. Her reports led to an FBI investigation. The damaging FBI report led to the Department of Justice stepping in and placed the agency on probation. The DOJ oversaw the Orange County Sheriff's Office for three years while the Sheriff retrained his deputies and changed his use of force policies.

Nguyen was known for her investigative reports about legal issues and the criminal justice system. She shed light to viewers when she broke the story about an Orange County county commissioner who was indicted for taking illegal campaign contributions and then later tried to go on welfare. During the nine years she was in Orlando, she continued to report on the complexities of the justice system while covering controversial cases such as the Casey Anthony case, Trayvon Martin case and covered the Tiger Woods case. In 2012, Nguyen left WFTV.

The journalist continued working on the Trayvon Martin case when she started working for NBC News. Trayvon Martin is a 17-year-old African American teenager who was fatally shot by George Zimmerman in Sanford, Florida. The neighborhood watch volunteer called Sanford police to report Martin, who he said appeared "suspicious." Moments later, there was an altercation between the two individuals in which Zimmerman shot Martin, killing him. A national debate about racial profiling and stand your ground laws ensued, and the governor of Florida appointed a task force to examine the state's laws.

In 2013, she started working as an investigative and general assignment reporter at KPNX-TV, the NBC affiliate in Phoenix, Arizona. She was also a contributing writer for USA Today and The Arizona Republic. During her time in Arizona, she covered numerous stories including the highly publicized trial of Jodi Arias, and the Yanira Maldonaldo case where an Arizona mother was detained after Mexican officials accused her of smuggling marijuana into the country. Maldonado's case sparked widespread media coverage and attention from U.S. lawmakers as family members pushed for her freedom "Yanira Maldonado freed from Mexican jail - BBC News". BBC News. 31 May 2013.

Nguyen later left KPNX-TV, the NBC affiliate and started law school. She became a law clerk for Honorable Sherry K. Stephens, the judge who presided over the Jodi Arias case in Phoenix, Arizona.

Nguyen received her Juris Doctor from Florida State University College of Law. She served as a prosecutor in Orlando for the Office of the State Attorney in the Ninth Judicial Circuit of Florida. Prior to that, she was an assistant public defender in the Fifth, Sixth and Thirteenth Judicial Circuit of Florida as well became a prosecutor in the Ninth Judicial Circuit of Florida, in Orlando, Florida.She continues her work in media, law and social policy. The Florida Bar President-Elect appointed Nguyen to the Florida Bar Committee Leadership. Nguyen served as Chairwoman, for The Florida Bar Media and Communications Law Committee. Nguyen is the first Asian-American woman in Florida to be appointed as vice chair and Chair for The Florida Bar Media and Communications Law Committee.

== Miss Teenage America ==
Nguyen is also known for being 'TEEN Magazine's Miss Teenage America in 1993. The pageant was owned by Teen Magazine. Her mother, Mai Pham, thought it brought honor to the Vietnamese community and reminded them that "their assimilation into U.S. culture" was fairly complete.

== Honors and awards ==
- Miss Teenage America (1993)
- Eli Segal Education Award, Equal Justice Works AmeriCorps JD Program, Corporation for National & Community Service (2015)
- Associated Press Award- Kathryn Dettman Award
- Associated Press Award- Clete Roberts Memorial Award
- Mark of Excellence Award in Journalism (The Society of Professional Journalists Los Angeles Chapter)
- California Legislative Enacted Resolution No. 673 (commendation and recognition)
- State of Michigan Legislative Tribute, Michigan State Senator James Barryman & State Representative Lynn Owen commendation for public policy and advocacy efforts on behalf of MADD in the state of Michigan.
- Emmy Nomination- WFTV Team Coverage- Caylee Anthony Found (2009)
- Emmy Nomination- Category: Politics/ Government- Investigative Report (2009)
