= John Schubeck =

American news anchor (1936–1997)

- Born: March 18, 1936; Detroit, Michigan, U.S.
- Died: September 26, 1997 (aged 61); Los Angeles, California, U.S.
- Education: University of Michigan 1958, Loyola Law School, Los Angeles
- Occupation: News anchor
- Years active: 1957-1995
- Employer(s): WJR(1957-1962); WRCV-TV (1962-1964); WIP (1964); WGN-TV (1965-1966); KNBC-TV (1966-1967); WABC-TV (1967-1971); KABC-TV (1971-1974); KNBC-TV (1974-1983); KNXT/KCBS-TV (1983-1988); KIEV (1993); KMIR-TV (1993-1995)
- Agent: Ed Hookstraten
- Notable credit(s): Emmy Awards; Gold Mike Award
- Spouse: Meghan
- Children: Tina, Gretchen, Elliott; Jonathon, Avery

John Schubeck (March 18, 1936 – September 26, 1997) was an American television reporter and anchor, and one of the few to anchor newscasts on all three network owned-and-operated stations in one major market.

== Early life and career ==
Schubeck was born in Detroit, Michigan. He was a graduate of Denby High School in Detroit in 1954, and the University of Michigan. While attending the University of Michigan, Schubeck broadcast half-time events at Football games for WUOM, and was the #1 Golfer on the Michigan Golf team. After graduation, he began his broadcasting career at Detroit radio station WJR, working with station legend J.P. McCarthy. He then worked as a reporter at then-NBC-owned WRCV radio and television, and later at WIP radio, all in Philadelphia, before rejoining NBC News in 1966 for his first stint as an anchor at KNBC in Los Angeles, where he helmed that station's late evening newscast until February 1967. Several months later Schubeck moved to ABC News as early evening anchor at WABC-TV in New York City; he also did newscasts for the American Contemporary Radio Network. His run as anchor ended in 1969, and for the remainder of his stay with ABC in New York, he was WABC-TV's theatre critic.

== Career in Southern California ==
In 1971, ABC moved Schubeck back to Los Angeles, to co-anchor KABC-TV's Eyewitness News broadcasts. In 1974 Schubeck returned to KNBC, this time to replace Tom Snyder on the anchor roster of the KNBC Newservice (reformatted in 1976 as NewsCenter 4). At KNBC he was part of a news team which also included co-anchors Bob Abernethy, Jess Marlow, Paul Moyer, Tritia Toyota and Kelly Lange; sportscasters Stu Nahan (both worked together at KABC-TV), Bryant Gumbel and Ross Porter; and weatherman (and future Wheel of Fortune host) Pat Sajak. Schubeck was known for acknowledging whichever the NBC's Los Angeles–based staff announcers was on duty, when he was anchoring–during his run as at the station. This group included Donald Rickles (not to be confused with the insult comic of the same name), Peggy Taylor, Don Stanley and Victor Bozeman. Along with his local duties, Schubeck also anchored NBC News updates during primetime in the Pacific Time Zone.

In 1983, Schubeck departed from KNBC and joined KNXT (now KCBS-TV) in September of that year. He remained at KCBS-TV until 1988. During his time in Los Angeles, he earned a law degree from Loyola Law School. He was represented by famous Los Angeles Agent, Ed Hookstratten, in his broadcasting career. In his last broadcasting jobs, he hosted a radio show on KIEV in 1993 and a brief anchoring stint at KMIR-TV in Palm Springs from 1993 to 1995.

One time he was asked about the validity of a story by Peter Bart, towards the end of one of the 11 p.m. newscasts Schubeck anchored one night, he had read only ten minutes earlier, that was displayed again on the teleprompter. Faced with either repeating the story or doing an ad lib, Schubeck instead just sat motionless and silent, waiting for the correct story to come up, and remained that way until the newscast ended.

== Other media work ==
Schubeck was featured in an episode of the short-lived 1973 TV series version of Adam's Rib, and appeared as a newscaster in the 1981 movie Buddy Buddy.

== Personal life and death ==
During his college years at the University of Michigan, he was the No. 1 player on the golf team and did broadcasts on WUOM as well as the half-time broadcasts of the Wolverines football games. Awarded an Evans Golf Scholarship, he became the top ranked amateur golfer in the United States, eventually participating in many pro am and celebrity golf tournaments. A tournament was named after him in Indian Wells, California, the John Schubeck Golf Classic.

Schubeck was one of the earliest millionaire local television news anchors. He generated around $1 million a year during his stints. However, he battled alcoholism throughout his life. He died in Stember 1997 from kidney and liver failure at age 61. Friends say that the stress of covering news events, often involving calamity, contributed to his alcoholism, his career setbacks, and untimely death. He died in relative obscurity at Columbia West Hills Medical Center. His obituary appeared in The New York Times. The story provided a tribute to a fellow journalism colleague, close friend and co-anchor Tritia Toyota, who reportedly paid for his memorial services.
