= NBC Saturday Night at the Movies =

American television series (1961–1978)

NBC Saturday Night at the Movies was the first television show to broadcast in color relatively recent feature films from major studios. The series premiered on September 23, 1961, and ran until October 1978, spawning many imitators. Television stations had previously only been able to show older, low-budget, black-and-white films. In the late 1970s, competition from cable television and home video led to a decline in viewership.

== History ==
=== Background and early history ===
During the early days of television, the major studios were hesitant to release their films on TV. The movies that did make it to television were usually low-budget B movies or older black-and-white academy ratio films that had already lost their value in theaters, with the notable exceptions of some of Walt Disney's films and The Wizard of Oz (1939). These films were mostly aired on local TV stations or during non-prime time schedules by the late 1950s. To avoid competition, the top studios had an unwritten agreement that limited the exhibition of films made after 1948, which excluded most films shot in CinemaScope and color – features that audiences had come to expect. Nevertheless, by the late 1950s, the major studios started to loosen their stance and began releasing more recent movies on television.

During the early 1970s, there was a significantly longer period of time between when a movie was initially shown in theaters and when it was first broadcast on television. This delay was more pronounced compared to previous years, indicating a shift in the distribution and consumption of films during that time. Perhaps, this change in release schedules was due to a growing demand for films on TV or the emergence of alternative modes of film distribution. Regardless of the reason, it highlights the evolution of the film industry and its response to changing audience preferences. Between 1954 and 1972, a theatrical motion picture (even a relatively recent one) had to wait as many as 12 years (as in the case of the 1959 Ben-Hur) before it turned up on the home screen.

A short-lived black-and-white ABC-TV series entitled Famous Film Festival, which featured British films made in the 1940s and early 1950s, premiered in the fall of 1955. In 1957, ABC broadcast Hollywood Film Theater, which also featured some pre-1948 films produced by RKO Radio Pictures. RKO decided to sell some of their better pre-1948 movies to ABC while other films would be syndicated to local TV stations. Films in both series were shown in a ninety-minute time slot, which meant that some of the films had to either be severely edited or shown in two parts. NBC Saturday Night at the Movies was the first network movie anthology series to run two hours (and occasionally longer), so that almost all of the films could be shown in one evening, the films being edited (especially in later years) only to remove objectionable content.

For its 1961–62 television season, NBC obtained the rights to broadcast 31 post-1950 movie titles from 20th Century Fox, although only 30 were actually telecast that season (one film, The Seven Year Itch, not being televised until the start of the 1963 season). On September 23, 1961, Saturday Night at the Movies premiered with the 1953 Marilyn Monroe–Lauren Bacall–Betty Grable film How to Marry a Millionaire, presented "In Living Color". Some of the other movies shown were The Day the Earth Stood Still (March 3, 1962) and No Highway in the Sky (March 24, 1962). (Having been filmed in Cinemascope, a Fox specialty from 1953 to 1967, many of these films had to be severely panned-and-scanned to fit the invariable full screen television aspect ratio of the time.) That initial deal with Fox ended up lasting three seasons (1961–1964) and involved about 90 films, including those run on Monday nights beginning in February 1963. When Fox found greener pastures over at rival ABC, NBC negotiated releases from other studios, such as MGM and Paramount, that were eager to provide content. Because commercial breaks then were shorter than today (running from one to two minutes), films running less than two hours sometimes ended before the close of the program. The remaining time was filled up with theatrical trailers of upcoming films scheduled to be shown on the series in the next two or three weeks. By about 1968, this was no longer necessary, as films and commercial breaks had become longer.

The three major commercial networks did not show worn-out 16mm prints of films, as was then the usual practice on local TV stations. The films which aired on the network movie anthology series (as well as annually-telecast specials such as The Wizard of Oz) were 35mm prints, invariably in excellent condition. With the advent of cable television, VHS, and DVD, the idea of always showing films – even very old ones – in pristine, remastered condition on television has become the norm; but aside from films shown on the three major networks, this was simply not done before the 1980s. Up until then, local stations had to settle for inexpensive 16mm prints of such relatively recent films as Heaven Knows, Mr. Allison (1957) or Prince Valiant (1954), rather than good "theater-quality" prints as seen on the networks.

=== The birth of the "made for TV movie" ===
The demand for televised movies increased during the 1960s. Made-for-television films were soon created by NBC, along with some help from now-sister company Universal. The first, created during the 1963–64 season, was to have been a new version of Ernest Hemingway's The Killers, with a cast that included Lee Marvin, Angie Dickinson, and future US president Ronald Reagan, whose last film this was before entering politics. However, NBC deemed the film too violent for television, so it was released in theaters instead.

Although there had been filmed feature-length television specials—such as The Pied Piper of Hamelin (1957), a 1960 Hallmark Hall of Fame Macbeth filmed in color on location in Scotland, and, as early as 1954, a musical version filmed in color of Charles Dickens's A Christmas Carol telecast on CBS's Shower of Stars—the film generally regarded as the first made-for-television movie was See How They Run, directed by David Lowell Rich and starring John Forsythe and Senta Berger. It first aired on October 7, 1964, and ushered in a series of other TV movies over the years, aired on NBC under the title NBC World Premiere Movie. Many of the made-for-television movies on NBC would become TV series in their own right during the late-1960s and early-1970s. One of the more famous examples was Fame Is the Name of the Game (1966), which ultimately served as the pilot episode for the 1968–71 series The Name of the Game.

=== Influence on other networks ===
Saturday Night at the Movies attracted sufficient ratings so that NBC and its competitors added more movie series to the prime time schedule. ABC, then a distant third in the ratings, immediately added another movie series, Hollywood Special, as a mid-season replacement; however, the series, under its new title The ABC Sunday Night Movie, did not become a regular television program until 1964. CBS was leading the other networks in the ratings at that time and did not immediately add a prime time movie series. However, over the next few years, each of the three networks added weeknight movies to the schedule; and by 1968, there was a prime time network movie for every night of the week:

- The ABC Sunday Night Movie
- The NBC Monday Movie (originally titled NBC Monday Night at the Movies)
- NBC Tuesday Night at the Movies
- The ABC Wednesday Night Movie
- The CBS Wednesday Night Movies
- The CBS Thursday Night Movies
- The CBS Friday Night Movies
- The CBS Saturday Night Movies
- NBC Saturday Night at the Movies
- The CBS Sunday Night Movies
- NBC Friday Night at the Movies
- Fox Presents
- Fox Saturday Late Night Movies
- Fox Saturday Afternoon Movies

The popularity of these movie broadcasts also provided a windfall profit to the movie studios, since competitive bidding for popular movies raised the price for broadcast rights. This, in turn, made it cost-effective to produce "made for TV" movies.

=== Announcers ===
As with the other movie anthology series of the time, there was no host for the program. Although an announcer's voice was heard at the beginning, the program itself simply consisted of the showing of the film and perhaps a movie trailer afterward.

For years, Don Stanley served as the show's main announcer and recorded the opening credits and bumpers, mainly at NBC Studios in Burbank. In later years, those duties alternated among Stanley, Donald Rickles, Peggy Taylor, and Victor Bozeman. Near the end of the show's run, opening credits (for the series, not for the films themselves) were handled by the network's New York announcing staff, which included Fred Collins and Howard Reig; but the Burbank staff announcers still handled bumpers.

=== Decline and later years ===
NBC broadcast Saturday Night at the Movies until October 1978. Several other movie series were canceled by the end of the decade. However, some continued well into the 1980s and beyond. Changes in television viewing habits, though, seemed to spell the end for many of these series. Loss of ratings for them has been attributed to increased competition from cable television, especially pay movie channels that were able to show movies uncut and without commercial interruptions. Other factors that led to the decline of the TV network movie presentations include the advent of home video and video rental, pay-per-view, and video-on-demand.

=== Current-day status ===
The NBC Saturday Night Movie has been periodically broadcast on Saturdays 8:00 p.m.–11:00 p.m. since 2000, and originally had hosted continuity by Ryan Seacrest. It was replaced by coverage of the XFL in 2001, but returned the next year without host continuity. By 2006, the network decided to only occasionally air theatrical films during sweeps weeks in various time slots, so the Saturday movie has been completely discontinued. In 2009 and 2010, Walmart and Procter & Gamble purchased some Friday- and Saturday-night time on NBC and Fox to broadcast television films they produced and would distribute on DVD the week after, such as The Jensen Project, although the ratings for these films were well below regular programming. The P&G/Walmart series of films was eventually discontinued, with Walmart eventually being one of the main sponsors of NBC's live musical event The Sound of Music Live! in December 2013.

As of 2020, NBC Movie Night, as it was now known, had Chick-fil-A as the film's presenting sponsor and was still very occasional on the network's Saturday night schedule. It was almost always connected to an NBCUniversal property's vertical integration involving an upcoming theatrically-released film (as well as other studios for example Disney-ABC Domestic Television (including 20th Century Fox library), Warner Bros. Television, Sony Pictures Television, MGM Television, Paramount Pictures, Lionsgate Television...). In 2020, for instance, the eighth installment in the Fast & Furious franchise, The Fate of the Furious, aired to connect to the later-delayed release of F9, with DreamWorks Animation's Trolls airing in March to promote the upcoming release of Trolls World Tour (which would eventually be released as a premium home rental due to the COVID-19 pandemic). In May 2022, Jurassic World aired to promote the June 10 release of Jurassic World Dominion, while later in June 2022, Illumination's Despicable Me 3 aired to promote the July 1 release of Minions: The Rise of Gru.
