= Stanley Karnow =

American historian and journalist

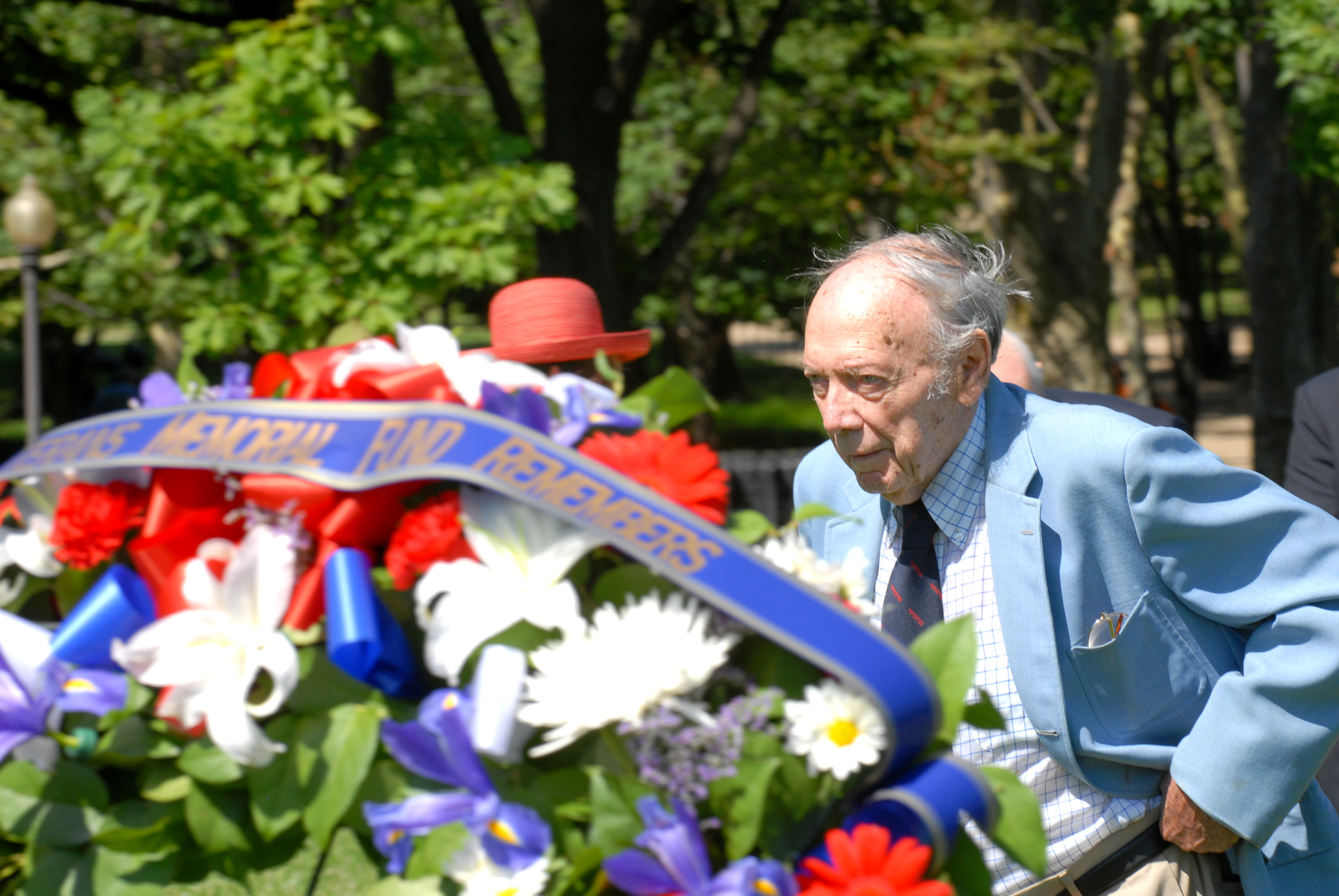
- Karnow in 2009
- Born: Stanley Abram Karnow; February 4, 1925; New York City, US
- Died: January 27, 2013 (aged 87); Potomac, Maryland, US
- Education: Harvard College, A.B. 1947 (European history and literature) Sorbonne, University of Paris, 1947–48 Ecole des Sciences Politiques, 1948–49.
- Occupations: journalist, historian
- Known for: Vietnam: A Television History (1983), with others; listed in Nixon's Enemies List
- Spouse(s): Claude Sarraute (m. 1948, div. 1955); Annete Kline (m. 1959, died 2009)
- Children: 3
- Awards: Pulitzer Prize in history (1990); Shorenstein Prize (2002); Overseas Press Club award (1968)
- Military career
- Allegiance: United States
- Branch: United States Army Air Forces
- Service years: 1943–1946
- Conflicts: China Burma India theater

Stanley Abram Karnow (February 4, 1925 – January 27, 2013) was an American journalist and historian. He is best known for his writings on East Asia and the Vietnam War.

== Education and career ==
Karnow was born in Brooklyn in 1925, and had a middle-class, secular Jewish upbringing. His father was a machinery salesman; his mother, an immigrant from Hungary, a homemaker. Interested in writing from a young age, at James Madison High School in Brooklyn he wrote radio plays and was a sports writer and an editor of the school paper.

Karnow enrolled at the University of Iowa, but left in 1943 to serve in the Army Air Force, in which he was a weather observer, cryptographer and unit historian along the China-India border. After the war, he attended Harvard University, where he was an editorial and feature writer for the Harvard Crimson and majored in modern European history and literature. Upon graduating in 1947, Karnow went to Paris intending to stay the summer, but wound up staying ten years.

=== Journalist ===
Karnow attended the Sorbonne and the Institut d'Études Politiques on the G.I. Bill, and did freelance journalism for the National Guardian, L’Observateur, and New Statesman. In 1950, he was taken on as a local "interpreter, researcher, and legman" by the Paris bureau of Time magazine, but was soon promoted to correspondent, covering France, Western Europe, and francophone North Africa. Following a year at Harvard as a Neiman Fellow, he headed Time's new Rabat bureau in 1958-59, and then its Hong Kong bureau until 1962.

Karnow spent the most influential part of his reporting career in east and southeast Asia. He covered the region from 1959 until 1974 for Time, Life, the Saturday Evening Post, London Observer, the Washington Post, and NBC News. Karnow was acquainted with Indochina from his work in Paris, and was in Vietnam in July 1959 when the first Americans were killed, He gave attention to the Vietnam War during its earliest years when few Americans were aware of it, and he reported on it for the duration of American involvement. He was close friends with Anthony Lewis and Bernard Kalb. Karnow's Vietnam reporting landed him a place on President Nixon's "Enemies List".

After the war, in the 1970s and 1980s, Karnow was a columnist for King Features Syndicate, a contributor to Le Point and Newsweek International, and an editor with The New Republic. He was also a founder and editor of the International Writers Service, a non-profit agency which commissioned work from European and Japanese journalists on their own countries and made it available to American newspapers.

=== Author ===
Karnow’s first book was his text for Southeast Asia (1962), a volume in his employer's illustrated, mass-market, Life World Library series. His first major publication was Mao and China: From Revolution to Revolution (1972), a 600-page analysis of the recent Cultural Revolution. The book built on Karnow's Hong Kong reporting on a then-isolated China and a fellowship year at Harvard, and was nominated for a National Book Award. Despite his place on Nixon's Enemies List, Karnow received an invitation to accompany Nixon on his historic visit to China in 1972, during which he sought to confirm the information in his manuscript.

In 1977, two years after the fall of Saigon, PBS suggested to Karnow a television series on the Vietnam War. He worked in tandem on the series and on what became a 750-page book, Vietnam: A History (1983). For the 13-hour Vietnam: A Television History, Karnow was historical adviser and credited as "chief correspondent". The series aired in 1983, was PBS's most-watched documentary series to date, and won numerous awards. The titles reflected contemporary American usage, referring not to the centuries-old country but to the recent war. 90% of the book treated the years 1945-75, and called attention to the continuities between the French and American wars. The film was similarly focused, with only a brief prologue on prewar French colonialism and a final hour on post-1975 "legacies". Both were very successful, reaching large parts of the American public at a time when interest in the war was reviving after nearly a decade of forgetting. Like the conflict itself, the book and film were controversial and helped spark the ongoing public debate on the history and meaning of the war.

External videos
- Presentation by Karnow on Vietnam: A History, July 6, 2001, C-SPAN
- Booknotes interview with Karnow on In Our Image, May 28, 1989, C-SPAN
- Presentation by Karnow on Paris in the Fifties, December 15, 1997, C-SPAN

Rising political unrest in the Philippines in the 1980s, culminating in the fall of the 20-year regime of President Ferdinand Marcos, prompted Karnow's second book and television project. The book, In Our Image: America's Empire in the Philippines (1989), won a Pulitzer Prize for History. Karnow was chief correspondent and narrator for the companion three-part PBS television documentary, The U.S. and the Philippines: In Our Image. Unlike the academic style of his China book, Karnow's narratives on Vietnam and the Philippines combined research, reporting, and personal observations.

Asian Americans in Transition, a report for the Asia Society, appeared in 1992. Half of the chapters were authored by Karnow and half by Nancy Yoshihara, co-founder of the Asian American Journalists Association. The report focused on the characteristics and challenges of Asian immigrants, whose numbers had swelled since the 1960s. Karnow immediately began work on a book on the Asian experience in the United States, but ultimately decided that an Asian was more suited for the job.

In his last published book, Paris in the Fifties (1997), Karnow chronicled his years as a young reporter in Europe and North Africa, making use of his copies of dispatches that had been used mostly as background material by Time editors in New York. He contemplated, but never executed, a fuller memoir with notional titles Out of Asia or Interesting Times. A book on Jewish humor progressed only as far as an outline. Karnow nonetheless published reviews and articles, and remained a sought-after lecturer and media commentator until his death in 2013.

Karnow was a member of the Council on Foreign Relations, the Asia Society, and the Society of American Historians. His papers pertaining to his work in and on Asia are archived at the Hoover Institution and the John F. Kennedy Presidential Library.

== Personal life ==
Stanley Karnow was born in a Jewish family in Brooklyn on February 4, 1925, the son of Harry and Henriette Koeppel Karnow (Karnofsky). In 1947, he married Claude Sarraute, then a stage actress from a French literary family, who soon began her own career as a journalist. They divorced in 1955.

In 1959, he married Annette Kline, a widowed artist who was working at the time as a cultural attaché for the U.S. State Department in Algiers and Paris. They had a daughter and a son, and Karnow adopted Kline's son from her first marriage. Annette Karnow died of cancer in July 2009. The offspring had careers as, respectively, a travel photographer, television writer/producer, and a Judge.

Karnow died on January 27, 2013, at his home in Potomac, Maryland, at age 87 of congestive heart failure.

== Works ==
- Karnow, Stanley (1997). Vietnam: A History. 2nd rev. and updated (New York, NY: Penguin Books, 1997). Penguin. ISBN 0140265473. LCCN 97197160.
- Karnow, Stanley (1997). Paris in the Fifties (New York, NY: Times Books, 1997). Ill. by Annette Karnow. Times Books. ISBN 0812927818. LCCN 97018521.
- Asian Americans in Transition (New York, NY: Asia Society, 1992).
- Karnow, Stanley (1989). In Our Image: America's Empire in the Philippines (New York, NY: Random House, 1989). Random House. ISBN 0394549759. LCCN 88042676.
- Karnow, Stanley (1984). Mao and China: Inside China's Cultural Revolution (New York, NY: Penguin Books, 1984). Viking Press. ISBN 0140072217. LCCN 84009392.
- Karnow, Stanley (1983). Vietnam: A History (New York, NY: Viking Press, 1983). Viking Press. ISBN 0670746045. LCCN 83047905.
- Karnow, Stanley (1972). Mao and China: From Revolution to Revolution (New York, NY: Viking Press, 1972). Introd. by John K. Fairbank. Viking Press. ISBN 0670454273. LCCN 77187967.
- "The Vietnam Debacle: The revisionists who believe that the war was just—and winnable—are rewriting a history they don't understand". Salon.com. April 27, 2000. Archived from the original on June 7, 2011.
- (Preface) The First Time I Saw Paris: Photographs and Memories from the City of Light, Times Books, 1999.
