= Night Beat (radio program) =

1950s radio program

- Nightbeat star Frank Lovejoy.
- Language: English
- Home station: NBC
- Starring: Frank Lovejoy
- Announcer: Donald Rickles
- Original release: February 6, 1950 – September 25, 1952
- Sponsored by: Pabst Blue Ribbon Beer; Wheaties

Night Beat, sometimes spelled Nightbeat, is an NBC radio drama series that aired February 6, 1950 – September 25, 1952, sponsored by Pabst Blue Ribbon Beer and Wheaties.

== Description ==
Frank Lovejoy starred as Randy Stone, a reporter who covered the night beat for the Chicago Star, encountering criminals, eccentrics, and troubled souls. Listeners were invited to join Stone as he "searches through the city for the strange stories waiting for him in the darkness." Supporting actors included Joan Banks, Parley Baer, William Conrad, Jeff Corey, Lawrence Dobkin, Paul Frees, Jack Kruschen, Peter Leeds, Howard McNear, Lurene Tuttle, Martha Wentworth, and Ben Wright. The announcer was Donald Rickles.

Most episodes leaned towards suspense, crime and thriller themes, but Night Beat also featured occasional humorous or sentimental stories. Typical plots included Stone trying to mediate a gang war between Chinese immigrant groups ("Tong War", broadcast 04-17-1950); Stone covering the breaking story of a mentally ill man who has kidnapped a young boy and is threatening to throw him from a church bell tower ("Sanctuary", 06-22-1951); and Stone accidentally dialing a wrong phone only to contact a woman who believes her husband is plotting a murder ("City at Your Fingertips", broadcast 07-31-1950). Each episode ended with Stone at his desk as he finished typing a news story based on his latest exploits, and shouting for the copy boy to deliver his story to an editor.

Radio historian John Dunning described Nightbeat as a "superior series", carried by vivid writing and Lovejoy's sympathetic performance.

Ripperologist editor Paul Begg offered this description of the series:

Broadcast on NBC, Nightbeat ... starred Frank Lovejoy as Randy Stone, a tough and streetwise reporter who worked the nightbeat for the Chicago Star, looking for human interest stories. He met an assortment of people, most of them with a problem, many of them scared, and sometimes he was able to help them, sometimes he wasn't. It is generally regarded as a "quality" show, and it stands up extremely well. Frank Lovejoy (1914–1962) isn't remembered today, but he was a powerful and believable actor with a strong delivery, and his portrayal of Randy Stone as tough guy with humanity was perfect. The scripts were excellent, given that they had to cover much in a short time. There was a good supporting cast, orchestra and sound effects. "The Slasher," broadcast on 10 November 1950, the last show of season one, has a very loosely Ripper-derived plot in which Stone searches for an artist.

== Other media ==
=== Television ===
The format was recreated, with Lovejoy as Stone, on an episode of the television anthology series, Four Star Playhouse ("Search in the Night" 5 November 1953). This episode was a television pilot produced by Four Star Productions for a proposed, but ultimately unproduced, weekly television series.

=== In print ===
In December 2012, Old Time Radio distributor Radio Archives published Nightbeat: Night Stories, an ebook anthology of six new Nightbeat stories. Authors included were Howard Hopkins, Paul Bishop, Will Murray, Tommy Hancock (who also served as editor), Mark Squirek, and Bobby Nash. Each story used the traditional radio opening and closing, as well as Stone's first-person narration. Several characters from the radio series appear, and Hancock's entry – "Lucky" – attempts to explain who "Lucky" Stone from the original pilot really is.

Nightbeat: Night Stories was also released as an audiobook, read by Michael C. Gwynne.

== See also ==
- Bright Star
- Ford Theater
