= Tritia Toyota =

American journalist

- Born: March 29, 1947 (age 79); Portland, Oregon, U.S.
- Education: UCLA
- Occupations: News anchor Adjunct Professor
- Notable credit(s): KNX-AM; KNBC-TV Ch. 4 KCBS-TV Ch. 2
- Spouse: Michael Yamaki

Tritia Toyota (born March 29, 1947) is a former Los Angeles television news anchor and a current adjunct assistant professor in anthropology, Asian American studies and the media at the University of California at Los Angeles.

== Early life and education ==
Toyota was born in Portland, Oregon. She earned a master's degree in journalism from the University of California at Los Angeles in 1970, and later earned a PhD in anthropology.

== Career ==
Toyota began her broadcast career in Los Angeles in 1970 as a radio reporter with KNX-AM. In January 1972 she was hired as a general assignment reporter at KNBC-TV; she became weekend anchor there in 1975, and was promoted to the 5 p.m. edition of NewsCenter 4 with Jess Marlow as co-anchor in 1977 followed by the 11 p.m. newscast in 1978 with John Schubeck as co-anchor. Toyota's other co-anchors at KNBC included John Beard, Kelly Lange, Warren Olney and Jack Perkins.

Toyota quit KNBC (which became News 4 L.A. at the time of her resignation) in March 1985 and, after a standard three-month period between contracts, signed on as a news anchor for Channel 2 News at KCBS-TV, where she was reunited with many of her fellow KNBC alumni (Marlow, Schubeck and weathercaster Kevin O'Connell). Her other co-anchors at KCBS included Chris Conangla, Ross Becker, Michael Tuck, Jerry Dunphy and Paul Dandridge.

Initially anchoring at 6 and 11 p.m., by the early to mid 1990s Toyota was relegated to the morning and midday editions of Channel 2 Action News. On November 17, 1999, the Los Angeles Times reported that Toyota had left KCBS and that she previously had been removed from early morning and noon newscasts in September and October 1999 (known as CBS 2 News at the time of her removal). The story also reported that Toyota had been offered an opportunity to continue at the station and that she had declined.

In 1981, Toyota, along with reporters Bill Sing, Nancy Yoshihara, David Kishiyama, Frank Kwan, and Dwight Chuman, founded the Asian American Journalists Association. Toyota is currently an adjunct professor in the Department of Asian American Studies at UCLA. In 2009 she published a book "Envisioning America: New Chinese Americans and the Politics of Belonging".

== Personal life ==
Toyota is married to Michael Yamaki and lives in the Los Angeles area.

== In popular culture ==
Los Angeles punk rock band The Dickies recorded a song called "(I'm Stuck in a Pagoda with) Tricia Toyota." It's unclear whether the misspelling of Toyota's first name was deliberate or accidental.

Toyota is also mentioned in "The L.A. Song," a song by L.A. hip-hop group People Under The Stairs, from their 2002 album O.S.T..

In the 1978 comedy film Up in Smoke, television reporter 'Toyota Kawasaki' appears in a scene where she interviews police detective Sgt. Stedenko.

The TV news reporter character Tricia Takanawa on Family Guy may have been inspired at least in part by Toyota and KTTV Fox 11 reporter Tricia Takasugi has also been suggested as a source for the character.
