= Donald Rickles =

American actor (1927–1985)

- Born: Donald Newton Rickles; October 7, 1927; Portland, Oregon, U.S.
- Died: February 19, 1985 (aged 57); Glendale, California, U.S.
- Occupations: Radio and television announcer, news anchor, actor
- Years active: 1938−1984

Donald Newton Rickles (October 7, 1927 – February 19, 1985) was an American radio and television announcer, news anchor, and actor.

== Early life ==
He was born Donald Newton Rickles in Portland, Oregon on October 7, 1927.

== Career ==
Rickles began his announcing career at the age of 11 at KBPS (AM) in Portland. Later, he was chief announcer for KUSC-FM in Los Angeles, California. Other stations where he worked early in his career included KGW and KEX in Portland and KVAN in Vancouver, Washington.

In 1949, he became an announcer at KIEV in Los Angeles, and a year later, joined the announcing staff of NBC in Hollywood. He was part of a core group of West Coast announcers for the network who, in his early years, included Don Stanley, Arch Presby, Eddy King, and Frank Barton; by the 1970s, the main core announcing lineup had become Rickles, Stanley, Victor Bozeman, and Peggy Taylor.

Rickles's radio announcing credits included The Whisperer, The Great Gildersleeve, Night Beat, and NBC University Theater. On television, over the next three decades, he handled announcing duties for such programs as Coke Time with Eddie Fisher, The Tennessee Ernie Ford Show, The Dean Martin Show, The Flip Wilson Show, Sanford and Son, NBC Saturday Night at the Movies, NBC Monday Night at the Movies, and Bob Hope specials. He appeared in sketches on, and frequently did voice-over work for, The Tonight Show Starring Johnny Carson, and in a memorable 1978 episode of The Tomorrow Show, host Tom Snyder and he spent 10 minutes playing the Milton Bradley electronic game Simon. He also handled live booth-announcing duties for the network's Los Angeles owned-and-operated station KNBC.

He had also worked as a newscaster, at one point, anchoring KNBC's 11 pm newscast. In later years, after John Schubeck became anchor, Rickles was one of the rotating announcers for the station's NewsCenter 4, and was thanked on the air by Schubeck at the start of each newscast. As part of his continuity duties, Rickles also anchored out-of-vision for sign-on and sign-off editions of NewsCenter4.

== Death ==
On February 19, 1985, Rickles died in Glendale, California of a heart attack at age 57.
