= Peggy Taylor =

American actress (1927–2002)

- Born: Margaret Tague; October 12, 1927; Inglewood, California, U.S.
- Died: February 9, 2002 (aged 74); Cambria, California
- Occupations: Singer, Actress

Peggy Taylor (born Margaret Tague, October 12, 1927 – February 9, 2002) was an American singer and actress who later became a radio and television announcer.

== Early life ==
On October 12, 1927, Taylor was born as Margaret Tague in Inglewood, California, and was raised in Pasadena, California.

== Education ==
Taylor attended the University of California, Berkeley, where she graduated in 1949.

== Career ==
A few years afterward, she moved to Chicago. In 1952, she landed a spot as a vocalist on Don McNeill's Breakfast Club. During her time on the program, she recorded for Mercury Records; later in the 1950s, she recorded for such labels as Decca and Starlite. After her run on The Breakfast Club ended, she performed in nightclubs and supper clubs in places ranging from the Colony Club in London to the Fairmont Hotel in San Francisco, to places in and around Los Angeles, including the Cocoanut Grove. She also opened once for Red Skelton in Las Vegas.

In 1957, Taylor took part in Stan Freberg's Top 30 hit "Wun'erful, Wun'erful! (Sides uh-one and uh-two)," which parodied Lawrence Welk and his television program. On the record, she impersonated Welk's "Champagne Lady" at the time, Alice Lon. Likely on that basis, she became the resident singer on The Stan Freberg Show, where she performed cover versions of popular songs of the day. She occasionally tackled acting roles on the show, notably on the second edition, which aired on July 21, 1957. In a sketch called "Max's Delicatessen", Freberg and she played a perpetually harassed couple who receive constant telephone calls asking for Max's Delicatessen. The sketch is regarded today as a forerunner in its tone and writing to such modern-day sitcoms as Seinfeld. She also appeared as a spokesperson for DeSoto automobiles on the very first episode of You Bet Your Life with Groucho Marx.

In the 1960s, Taylor made occasional appearances on television. By the 1970s, she had moved on to announcing work, and in March 1973, she joined the West Coast announcing staff of NBC in Burbank, California, at a time when women were making inroads in the radio and television industries; in fact, she was the only full-time female staff announcer to be hired by the network on either coast. During her tenure at NBC, her announcer colleagues included Don Stanley, Donald Rickles, Victor Bozeman, and in her early years with the network, Frank Barton.

Taylor's voice was frequently heard on such network shows as NBC Saturday Night at the Movies and NBC Monday/Tuesday Night at the Movies, as well as introducing the one-minute NBC News Updates, which aired in the Pacific time zone and occasional voice-over work on The Tonight Show Starring Johnny Carson. The bulk of her announcing duties consisted of local live booth-announcing for the network's Los Angeles owned-and-operated station, KNBC, where she handled program introductions and closes, station identifications, promotions, bumpers, teasers, public service announcements, and sign-offs. She was among the rotating announcers who were thanked on the air every night by anchor John Schubeck at the start of each edition of the station's NewsCenter 4, for which Taylor also anchored sign-on and sign-off editions off-camera. Her announcing career with NBC came to an end around 1992.

== Personal ==
On February 9, 2002, Peggy Taylor died of natural causes at her home in Cambria, California, at age 74.
