= The Stan Freberg Show =

The Stan Freberg Show was a weekly radio comedy show that ran on the CBS Radio Network for 15 episodes in 1957 from July 14 through October 20. The show, starred comedian Stan Freberg and featured the vocal talents of Daws Butler, June Foray and Peter Leeds, Peggy Taylor as the resident singer, and the musical direction of Billy May. The show aired in the 7:30 p.m. (ET) time slot following repeats of The Jack Benny Program ("The Best Of Benny") on Sundays. The show was produced by Pete Barnum.

Despite its short run, the show contained some running gags and stock jokes, from Freberg's ambivalence toward Madison Avenue (faux advertisements for "Puffed Grass" and "Food," as well as the sketch "Gray Flannel Hatful of Teenage Werewolves") to the interviews with a sneaker-wearing Abominable Snowman. Freberg also developed an elaborate parody of Lawrence Welk's then-current Dodge Dancing Party, which he later released (in a somewhat shorter form) as a single, "Wun'erful, Wun'erful! (Sides uh-one & uh-two)." (He would reprise the Welk impersonation for his final show, in which the fictional Welk tersely mocks Freberg's cancellation.)

By the 13th episode, it was clear that The Stan Freberg Show was suffering from a lack of advertiser interest (perhaps helped by Freberg's werewolf comparisons). According to Freberg's autobiography, It Only Hurts When I Laugh, two different cigarette companies offered to sponsor the program, but Stan turned them down; because no other advertisers were willing to provide primary or alternate sponsorship on Freberg's terms, CBS canceled the series after 15 episodes. According to author Joe Bevilacqua, it was the last American network radio show to devote itself purely to comedy.

1958's The Best of the Stan Freberg Shows, a recording of collected material from the show, won the first 1959 Grammy Award for Best Spoken Word Album.

== Episodes ==
Episode	Original broadcast date	Scriptwriters	Featured sketches	Songs	Notes
1	July 14, 1957	Stan Freberg, Pete Barnum, Jack Rhodes	Marcel Toulez and his Tuned Sheep; Incident at Los Voraces		Also features Marvin Miller
2	July 21, 1957	Stan Freberg, Pete Barnum, Jack Rhodes	Interview with the Abominable Snowman; Great Moments in History - Barbara Fritchie; Leroy Straddle Interviews Mrs. Hagmeyer Prill; Max's Delicatessen	"The Birth of the Blues" (Peggy Taylor)	Also features Marvin Miller
2	July 21, 1957	Stan Freberg, Pete Barnum, Jack Rhodes	Interview with the Abominable Snowman; Great Moments in History - Barbara Fritchie; Leroy Straddle Interviews Mrs. Hagmeyer Prill; Max's Delicatessen	"Rock Around Stephen Foster" (Stan Freberg with Jud Conlon's Rhythmaires)	Also features Marvin Miller
3	July 28, 1957	Stan Freberg, Pete Barnum	A Couple at Home; Miss Jupiter; The Skin Divers' Mandolin Club; Leroy Straddle Interviews Mrs. Hagmeyer Prill; The Zazaloph Family; Stan Interviews Researcher Robert E. Tainter/Great Moments in History - Custer's Last Stand	"Cheek to Cheek" (Peggy Taylor)	Also features Virginia Gregg and Herb Vigran
4	August 4, 1957	Stan Freberg, Pete Barnum, Jack Rhodes, Daws Butler	Great Moments in History - Paul Revere; Hi-Fi Demonstration with Dr. Herman Horne; Lox Audio Theatre - Rock Around My Nose	"I Like the Likes of You" (Peggy Taylor)	Also features Hans Conried
4	August 4, 1957	Stan Freberg, Pete Barnum, Jack Rhodes, Daws Butler	Great Moments in History - Paul Revere; Hi-Fi Demonstration with Dr. Herman Horne; Lox Audio Theatre - Rock Around My Nose	"The Yellow Rose of Texas" (Stan Freberg)	Also features Hans Conried
5	August 11, 1957	Stan Freberg, Pete Barnum	Flying Saucer Sighting/Orville the Moon Man; Hi-Fi Demonstration with Dr. Herman Horne; Wun'erful, Wun'erful		
6	August 18, 1957	Stan Freberg, Pete Barnum, Daws Butler	Elderly Man River; Researcher Robert E. Tainter/Great Moments in History - Battle of the Nile; Face the Funnies	"Rock-a-Bye Your Baby with a Dixie Melody" (Peggy Taylor)	
6	August 18, 1957	Stan Freberg, Pete Barnum, Daws Butler	Elderly Man River; Researcher Robert E. Tainter/Great Moments in History - Battle of the Nile; Face the Funnies	"Rock Island Line" (Stan Freberg and Peter Leeds)	
7	August 25, 1957	Stan Freberg, Pete Barnum, Daws Butler, Jack Rhodes	The Lone Psychiatrist; Francois Toulez and His Hawaiian Nose Flute; There You Are - The Completion of the Transcontinental Railroad	"Dancing on the Ceiling" (Peggy Taylor)	
7	August 25, 1957	Stan Freberg, Pete Barnum, Daws Butler, Jack Rhodes	The Lone Psychiatrist; Francois Toulez and His Hawaiian Nose Flute; There You Are - The Completion of the Transcontinental Railroad	"Day-O (The Banana Boat Song)" (Stan Freberg and Peter Leeds)	
8	September 1, 1957	Stan Freberg, Pete Barnum, Daws Butler	The Zazaloph Family; Uninterrupted Melody; Face the Funnies; St. George and the Dragonet	"Around the World" (Peggy Taylor)	
9	September 8, 1957	Stan Freberg, Pete Barnum, Daws Butler	Interview with the Aboimnable Snowman; Researcher Robert E. Tainter/Crossington Washes the Delaware; The Honey-Earthers	"I Can't Sleep" (Peggy Taylor and Stan Freberg)	
10	September 15, 1957	Stan Freberg, Pete Barnum, Daws Butler	People Hate Freeways; The Build-It-Yourself Knock-Down Piano; Interview with Albert T. Wong, Fortune Cookie Writer; Hi-Fi Demonstration with Dr. Herman Horne	"Send for Me" (Peggy Taylor)	
10	September 15, 1957	Stan Freberg, Pete Barnum, Daws Butler	People Hate Freeways; The Build-It-Yourself Knock-Down Piano; Interview with Albert T. Wong, Fortune Cookie Writer; Hi-Fi Demonstration with Dr. Herman Horne	"Just One of Those Things" (Jud Conlon's Rhythmaires)	
10	September 15, 1957	Stan Freberg, Pete Barnum, Daws Butler	People Hate Freeways; The Build-It-Yourself Knock-Down Piano; Interview with Albert T. Wong, Fortune Cookie Writer; Hi-Fi Demonstration with Dr. Herman Horne	"Heartbreak Hotel" (Stan Freberg)	
11	September 22, 1957	Stan Freberg, Pete Barnum, Jack Rhodes	College Football Report; Interview with Foster Pelt, Agent to the Stars; Bang Gunleigh, U.S. Marshall Fields/Puffed Grass Commercials	"The Monkey Song" (Stan Freberg)	
11	September 22, 1957	Stan Freberg, Pete Barnum, Jack Rhodes	College Football Report; Interview with Foster Pelt, Agent to the Stars; Bang Gunleigh, U.S. Marshall Fields/Puffed Grass Commercials	"Famous Last Words" (Peggy Taylor)	
12	September 29, 1957	Stan Freberg, Pete Barnum, Jack Rhodes	Leroy Straddle Interview - Rocket Sled; How to Fix Leaky Faucet; Bob Tainter's New Racket	"Has Anybody Seen My Gal?" (Billy May and his Orchestra)	
12	September 29, 1957	Stan Freberg, Pete Barnum, Jack Rhodes	Leroy Straddle Interview - Rocket Sled; How to Fix Leaky Faucet; Bob Tainter's New Racket	"Rainbow" (Peggy Taylor)	
12	September 29, 1957	Stan Freberg, Pete Barnum, Jack Rhodes	Leroy Straddle Interview - Rocket Sled; How to Fix Leaky Faucet; Bob Tainter's New Racket	"Sh-Boom" (Stan Freberg, June Foray, and Jud Conlon's Rhythmaires)	
13	October 6, 1957	Stan Freberg, Pete Barnum	Panel Discussion - How to Improve Circus Attendance; Gray Flannel Hatful of Teenage Werewolves	"Cocktails for Two" (Billy May and his Orchestra with Jud Conlon's Rhythmaires)	
13	October 6, 1957	Stan Freberg, Pete Barnum	Panel Discussion - How to Improve Circus Attendance; Gray Flannel Hatful of Teenage Werewolves	"And the Angels Sing" (Peggy Taylor)	
14	October 13, 1957	Stan Freberg, Pete Barnum	Sponsored by Freberg/Freberg Commercials; The Return of Miss Jupiter; Freberg at World Advertising; Sam Spillade/More Freberg Commercials	"Love is Mine" (Peggy Taylor)	
15	October 20, 1957	Stan Freberg, Pete Barnum	Road Blocked by Sheep; Elderly Man River; Bang Gunleigh, U.S. Marshall Fields/Puffed Grass Commercials; Lawrence Welk Visits/A Short Medley Based on the Names of Girls (an excerpt from Wun'erful, Wun'erful); The Abominable Snowman Visits	"The Birth of the Blues" (Peggy Taylor)	A Best-Of show.
15	October 20, 1957	Stan Freberg, Pete Barnum	Road Blocked by Sheep; Elderly Man River; Bang Gunleigh, U.S. Marshall Fields/Puffed Grass Commercials; Lawrence Welk Visits/A Short Medley Based on the Names of Girls (an excerpt from Wun'erful, Wun'erful); The Abominable Snowman Visits	"Day-O (The Banana Boat Song)" (Stan Freberg and Peter Leeds)	A Best-Of show.
