= Colette Daiute =

American developmental psychologist

- Education: Ed.D.Columbia University Teachers College Ed.M. & M.A. Columbia University Teachers College B.A. Syracuse University
- Known for: Studying human development in adversity; Dynamic Narrative Inquiry
- Scientific career
- Fields: Developmental Psychology, Educational Psychology
- Workplaces: Teachers College, Columbia University Harvard University CUNY Graduate Center
- Website: www.colettedaiute.org

Colette Agnes Daiute is an American developmental and educational psychologist known for her research on human development under conditions of adversity and in rapidly changing environments. She studies how the social emotional development of children, youth and adults interacts with circumstances including social displacement, migration, discrimination, and economic inequality.

Daiute is a Distinguished Professor in the Ph.D. programs of psychology, educational psychology, and urban education at the CUNY Graduate Center, and is the co-founder and coordinator of the qualitative research methods concentration. She is the author of multiple books on narrative inquiry and human development in challenging and rapidly changing contexts.

== Honors and awards ==
Colette Daiute is recipient of the "Distinguished Contributions to Developmental Science Award" of the Jean Piaget Society for the Study of Knowledge and Development. Daiute was elected as a lifetime member of the National Academy of Education in 2021. In 2022, Daiute was named a Fulbright Specialist on projects related to social change and human development under extreme hardship. Supported by a Fulbright grant shared with the University of Naples Federico II Law School, Daiute has worked with lawyers and their asylum seeking clients to improve the credible fear interview process.

Daiute was Vice President of the Jean Piaget Society for the Study of Knowledge and Development from 2002 to 2008, and President of the Society in 2017. She is host and producer of the Jean Piaget Society podcast series "How Ideas Travel" which engages researchers from different countries in discussions about how ideas develop across generations.

== Education and employment ==
Daiute studied Romance Languages and Literature in the College of Liberal Arts at Syracuse University. After graduating from Syracuse University in 1970, she continued her education in Columbia University, where she completed her master's degree in Spanish Language and Literature and Ed.D. in Applied Linguistics and Developmental Psychology. Her doctoral dissertation investigated the interplay between linguistic structure and short-term memory processes during writing.

After graduation, Daiute worked as a postdoctoral fellow at Teachers College, Columbia University where she worked on several research projects. Between 1983 and 1994, she was an associate professor at the Harvard Graduate School of Education. While at Harvard, she continued her research on writing development as a sociocultural process. During this period, she served as a senior educational advisor in the research and development stage of the popular TV show for kids Ghostwriter, which aimed to make reading and writing fun.

In 1994, Daiute moved to the CUNY Graduate Center. At CUNY, she continued researching writing in the context of communication technologies and also shifted her attention to studying adolescent and youth development in relation to their rapidly changing environments, such as those involved in political violence, migration, and cultural population changes. For that research, Daiute developed dynamic storytelling inquiry, which she continues to extend with colleagues in a wide range of countries. Dynamic storytelling inquiry is research within locally meaningful practices including narratives and other expressions by diverse participants in social or educational change, such as policy makers, teachers, community, organizations, and young people who are often the subjects of interventions. Daiute has published 8 books and more than 100 research articles on these topics and others.

== Research activity and grants ==
Daiute's early research work focused on literacy development as a social and cultural process. After receiving her doctoral degree, she won a research grant from the Spencer Foundation to study middle school students’ uses of writing technologies. She also received an Apple Education Foundation to conduct a study on the psychological aspects of children's keyboarding skills that would enable their control over communication media as it evolved. Her interest in the role of computers in people's writing resulted in her first book “Writing and computers” that explored how computers can enhance writing skills for all level of writers.

As an associate professor at Harvard University, Daiute worked on grants from the National Council of Teachers of English, Apple Computer, Inc., and Spencer Foundation to explore different features of children's writing process, the role of play in writing, literacy development in children, and the role of multimedia computers for developing children's writing skills. Her research resulted in publishing papers in Cognition and Instruction, Harvard Educational Review, and other academic journals.

When Daiute continued her career at CUNY Graduate Center, she received numerous grants to investigate children's representations of violence and diversity in children's narratives, and published articles on the issues of racial equity, social diversity, and injustice. In 2004, together with Cynthia Lightfoot, she published a book “Narrative Analysis: Studying the Development of Individuals in Society” where they shed light on the sociological possibilities of narratives. This book provides both theoretical overview and practical applications of narrative methods.

After publishing this book, Daiute continued research on narrative inquiry in the context of conflict, as she received a grant from the United States Institute of Peace for research in former Yugoslavia. This research served as the foundation for several subsequent narrative studies on former Yugoslavia and her next book “Human Development and Political Violence” where she provides an extensive historical and sociopolitical overview of former Yugoslavia and presents an innovative dynamic storytelling approach to researching youth in challenging circumstances. This book demonstrates how youth in challenging circumstances could be supported and empowered to take action through narratives.

In addition to conducting policy research for practical implications, Daiute also worked on publishing her own research methodology that was reflected in her earlier works such as “Narrative Analysis” and “Human Development and Political Violence”. Her new book “Narrative Inquiry: A Dynamic Approach” focuses on a new theoretical orientation and gives practical recommendations for dynamic storytelling, providing the methodology for conducting research and suggestions for interpreting narratives. Daiute’s dynamic approach integrates cultural-historical activity theory, discourse theories, and interdisciplinary research on narratives in different cultural settings.

Following her research in Yugoslavia, Daiute was working on a research grant from UNICEF and OECD, and contributed a report to the “Roma National Strategy for Improving the Position of the Roma Community in the Republic of Serbia,” which she published together with Tunde Kovac-Cerovic, Minister of Education in Serbia. Their book “Minority Teachers – Roma in Serbia – Narrate Education Reform,” describes a policy-making research project that aims to create a safe and inclusive environment for Roma people. The case study of Roma people living in Serbia and the lived experiences of Roma pedagogical assistants are described in this book, as well as practice and research in an education reform program.

== Dynamic Narrative Inquiry ==
Dynamic Narrative Inquiry (DNI) is a qualitative and mixed methods research methodology that examines how narratives function in real-world contexts. Researchers following this approach study what narratives accomplish or perform in specific situations, in addition to their factual content. DNI looks at narratives in terms of their dynamic performative qualities, not just static texts to be analyzed in isolation. DNI can be applied to many types of communication beyond formal stories, including interviews, focus groups, and social media interactions.

Working with archival, ethnographic, practice-based, and child/youth stories, Daiute developed a unique approach to collaborative action research based on a cultural-historical approach, works of Vygotsky and Bakhtin, and Katherine Nelson's analysis of language development as occurring in social and cultural routines of daily life. Daiute and Nelson wrote influential articles extending Nelson's work with very young children's interactions in families to their interactions in the ever-increasing social worlds of schools and communities with culturally-diverse others. Daiute's approach offers a way to look at the developmental processes of children and youth who are growing up surrounded by social or political violence and interacting with those contexts via their uses of discourse genres as cultural tools for managing self-society relationships. She introduces the concept of “addressivity” in relation to narratives, meaning that motivation for an utterance changes depending on who it is addressed to, and people choose what to say or not to say. She also presents different narrative analysis strategies such as values analysis, plot analysis, significance analysis, character mapping, and time analysis.

Daiute contributed to narrative psychology and creation of a qualitative psychological methodology with her books and research. In her book "Human Development and Political Violence" Daiute demonstrates how the Dynamic Narrative Inquiry method revealed how growing up in conflict shaped Yugoslavian children's experiences with violence. Her analysis shows that violence can be seen as a way these children mediated and made sense of their circumstances. "Minority Teachers – Roma in Serbia – Narrate Education Reform" is another example of the usage of the Dynamic Narrative Inquiry approach to narrate educational reform in Serbia. The book describes the practical implementation of Dynamic Narrative Inquiry in the form of a Dynamic Storytelling Workshop involving Roma pedagogical assistants. In this workshop, they read, discussed and interpreted their narratives across diverse genres (letters, autobiographical and fictional narratives) which led to policy implementations to support Roma integration into society in Serbia.

Daiute used dynamic narrative inquiry in multiple research interventions, conducted in Brazil, Colombia, Italy, Serbia, and the United States. Her work has produced insights on the life of refugees, asylum seekers, undocumented, and multiply-discriminated youth at risk, demonstrating how young people actively engage in reflection about traumatic events and generate constructive responses to violence.

== Selected publications ==
- Daiute, C., Sullu, B., Kovacs-Cerovic, T. (2021). What is social inclusion?: Insights from interventions with youth across migration systems. Policy Insights from the Behavioral and Brain Sciences, 8(2) pages 143–151. https://doi.org/10.1177/23727322211033001
- Daiute, C. (2020). Narrating crisis from war zones to disease zones. Journal of Humanistic Psychology, 61 (2), pages 219 – 230. https://doi.org/10.1177/0022167820964329
- Daiute, C., Kovacs-Cerovic, T., Micic, K., Sullu, B., Vracar. S. (2020). Dynamic values negotiating geo-political narratives across a migration system. Qualitative Psychology, 7 (3), pages 367–383. http://dx.doi.org/10.1037/qup0000166
- Daiute, C. (2017). Narrating refuge. European Journal of Psychology, 13(1), pages 1–15. https://doi.org/10.5964/ejop.v13i1.1386
- Daiute, C. (2016). A relational theory of human development in the 21st century crisis of violence and displacement. Human Development, 59 (2 3): pages 128–151 http://dx.doi.org/10.1159/000448230

== Books ==
- Daiute, C. (Ed). (2018). Values analysis of global education initiatives. Global Education Network of Europe (GENE).
- Daiute, C. & Kovacs-Cerovic, T. with Todorova, R., Jokic, T., Ataman, A. (2017). Minority teachers – Roma in Serbia – Narrate education reform. Institute of Psychology, Faculty of Philosophy at the University of Belgrade and the Association of Pedagogical Assistants.
- Daiute, C. (2014). Narrative inquiry: A dynamic approach. Sage Publications.
- Daiute, C. (2010). Human development and political violence. Cambridge University Press.
- Daiute, C., Beykont, Z., Higson-Smith, C. & Nucci, L. (Eds.) (2006). International perspectives on youth conflict and development. Oxford University Press.
- Daiute, C., & Lightfoot, C. (2004). Narrative analysis: Studying the development of individuals in society. Sage Publications.
- Daiute, C. (Fall, 1993). The development of literacy through social interaction. New Directions in Child Development Source book (volume 61). Jossey-Bass, Inc.
- Daiute, C. (1985). Writing and computers. Addison-Wesley Publishing Co.
