= Taylor Marsh =

American political analyst

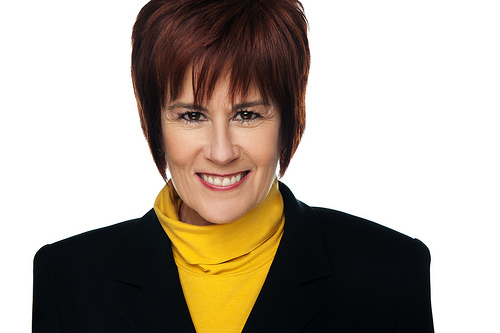
Taylor Marsh

Taylor Marsh (born 1954), the pseudonym for Michelle Marshall, is an author, political analyst and strategist and also the founder and publisher of the new media blog TaylorMarsh.com. TaylorMarsh.com became a central hub for Hillary Clinton's supporters during the 2008 primary election cycle. Marsh was a contributor to The Huffington Post, covering SEIU events and the AFSCME Democratic debate during 2007 and has written for several other new media sites.

== Early life ==
Marsh was born in Columbia, Missouri, growing up in St. Louis, after her father died. Marsh went to Stephens College in Columbia, Missouri, a liberal arts school, on scholarship.

Taylor competed in beauty pageants to pay for college, starting with Miss Teenage St. Louis and earning the title of "Miss Friendship" in the Miss Teenage America Pageant. Years later, she was crowned Miss Missouri, of 1974 going to the Miss America 1975 pageant.

== Professional background ==
=== Acting ===
Jerry Herman cast Marsh in her first audition that led to her part in The Grand Tour.

In 2005, Marsh wrote, produced and directed “Weeping for J.F.K.”.

=== Writing ===
Taylor worked at the alternative newsweekly LA Weekly in the personal ad department, starting in the early 1990s, as online dating was hitting. "Relationship consultant" became her official title. Marsh was responsible for starting the first "alternative" personal ad section at the LA Weekly. In 1996, Taylor started publishing short pieces online about dating and the personals, marriage and relationships. Taylor Marsh's trademark column inside the LA Weekly was "What Do You Want?," which included mixture of dating and personal ad advice, with political opinion included periodically.

In 1997, Taylor Marsh became managing editor to one of the first sites online to make money. Marsh wrote about politics daily on "The Editor's Desk," covering the fight between Ken Starr and Susan McDougal regularly, as the Monica Lewinsky scandal unfolded. Marsh resigned from the post after about a year. She wrote about her brief experience in her memoir, My Year in Smut...

Taylor was quoted in the Los Angeles Times in a 2000 article titled "L.A.'s Long Strange Tryst with Democrats," just after the time she began freelance writing, consulting and strategizing, which lasted throughout the 2000s. The Times quoting Marsh about former Pres. Bill Clinton: "I think Clinton understands the messiness of being human. Clinton knows how bright he is, but deep in his soul he has some sexual healing that he needs to go through, that he has some sexual urges that take him in an opposite direction [from] his intellect. Whole people are messy and incongruous and terribly, terribly flawed."

Taylor Marsh began blogging online during the John Kerry primary campaign of 2004. Marsh backed Hillary Clinton in July 2007, after reporting on the candidates.

In 2009, Marsh moved to the Washington, D.C. area.

== Bibliography ==
- Marsh's book The Sexual Education of a Beauty Queen: Relationship Secrets from the Trenches was published by Open Road Media in August 2014,.
- Marsh's book, The Hillary Effect - Politics, Sexism and the Destiny of Loss, was first published as an eBook on November 14, 2011, through Premier Digital Publishing.

== Media ==
Marsh has been interviewed by the BBC, CNN, MSNBC, C-SPAN's Washington Journal, Al Jazeera, and on the radio from coast to coast. Marsh was featured in The Hill's "The Washington Scene", covered in the National Journal's Hotline's OnCall; and quoted on NewYorkTimes.com.
