= Seung Min Kim =

American journalist (born 1985)

- Born: August 4, 1985 (age 41)
- Citizenship: United States
- Education: University of Iowa; American University
- Occupation: Journalist
- Years active: 2004–present
- Employer: Associated Press
- Spouse: Jeff Lee (m. 2016)
- Children: 1

Korean name
- Hangul: 김승민
- RR: Gim Seungmin
- MR: Kim Sŭngmin

Seung Min Kim (born August 4, 1985) is an American journalist who is a White House correspondent for the Associated Press and a political analyst for CNN.

== Early life and education ==
Kim was born to a South Korean family and grew up in Iowa City, Iowa. She states that she had wanted to be a journalist since the age of 12, and in her first year at the University of Iowa in 2004, she joined the student newspaper The Daily Iowan. She graduated from the University of Iowa with a BS in journalism and political science in 2007, before earning an MA in journalism from American University.

== Career ==
Kim started her career while still a student at the University of Iowa, working as a reporter at a number of newspapers including The Des Moines Register, the St Petersburg Times and The Star-Ledger. One of her earliest experiences was covering the Iowa presidential caucus in 2004 as a college freshman.

Kim joined USA Today as a reporter in Washington, D.C., in 2008, before moving to become a reporter covering the Senate and immigration policy for Politico in 2009. She became a White House correspondent writing about the Trump administration for The Washington Post in 2018. During this time, she led coverage on major topics such as the Brett Kavanaugh Supreme Court nomination, and Donald Trump's impeachment trial. In 2022, Kim joined the Associated Press.

In early 2021, Kim became the target of online abuse after a photo of her interviewing Senator Lisa Murkowski (R-Alaska) was circulated on social media. The Washington Post later issued a statement denouncing the "racists and sexist attacks". Kim's experience mirrors other female journalists who face criticism that extends beyond their professional capabilities into their personal lives. This trend has been exacerbated by social media, and media organizations have struggled with how to deal with online abuse which disproportionately targets women. Her experience was cited as an example when The Society of Professional Journalists (SPJ) issued a message at the end of Women's History Month in March 2021 calling on newsrooms to stand up for minority journalists who endure harassment and abuse.

Kim has appeared on CNN and PBS Washington Week as a political analyst. She is also a member of the Asian American Journalists Association, which honored her in 2020.

== Personal life and family ==
Kim married Jeff Lee in 2016. The couple live in Arlington, Virginia. She and her husband welcomed a child in 2024.
