= Peter Leeds =

American actor (1917–1996)

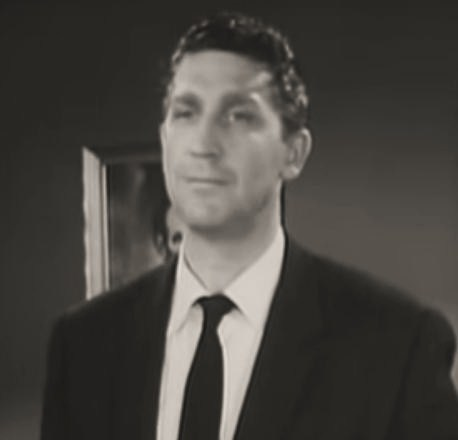
- Leeds in High School Big Shot (1959)
- Born: May 30, 1917; Bayonne, New Jersey, U.S.
- Died: November 12, 1996 (aged 79); Los Angeles, California, U.S.
- Occupation: Actor
- Years active: 1941–1996
- Spouse: Patricia Leeds (m. 1962)

Peter Leeds (May 30, 1917 – November 12, 1996) was an American actor who appeared on television more than 8,000 times and also had many film, Broadway, and radio credits. The majority of his work took place in the 1950s and 1960s. Working with many well-known comedians, he became popular as a straight man to their antics.

Beyond situation comedies, Peter Leeds was also a dramatic actor, a Broadway performer, and a regular on many variety shows. He made three guest appearances on Perry Mason and multiple appearances on the radio drama Yours Truly, Johnny Dollar.

Peter Leeds was also a popular voice-over artist, being heard on over 3,000 radio shows.

== Early life ==
A native of Bayonne, New Jersey, Leeds received his training at the Neighborhood Playhouse. He made his film debut with a bit part in Public Enemies (1941). He received a scholarship from the John Marshall Law School, which he attended for one year. He also attended the Neighborhood Playhouse School of the Theatre in New York City. Leeds was noticed by the Group Theater of New York, through which he received a scholarship and graduated.

== Career ==
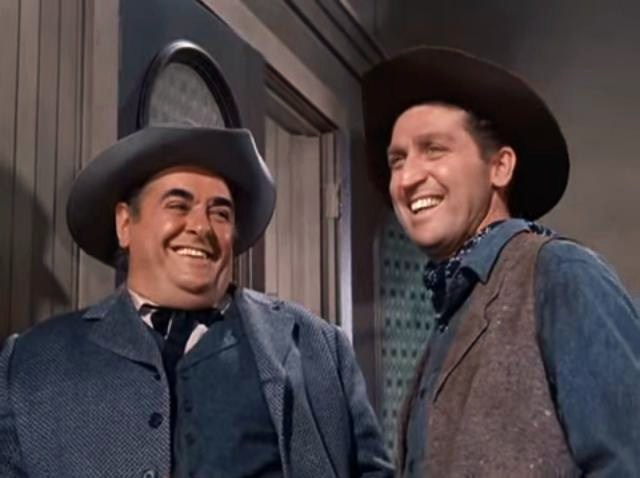
Leeds (right) in Bonanza, 1960

Leeds worked with hundreds of well-known actors, including Bob Hope, Lucille Ball, Milton Berle, Carol Burnett, Red Skelton, Jack Benny, Jerry Lewis, Dean Martin, and Johnny Carson. He appeared four times with David Janssen in the crime drama, Richard Diamond, Private Detective. Leeds was cast as George Colton in nine episodes of the 1960s CBS sitcom, Pete and Gladys. He guest-starred on an episode of the 1961 crime adventure-drama series The Investigators and on an episode of the 1962-1963 ABC drama series, Going My Way. In 1965, he guest-starred in an episode of The Cara Williams Show.

Leeds was known for his association with Stan Freberg and played his foil in several song parodies. In addition, he had several roles on both Volume One and Volume Two of the classic comedy albums Stan Freberg Presents the United States of America, and also appeared as a regular on the short-lived CBS radio series The Stan Freberg Show in 1957.

Leeds had a recurring role as gambler/saloon owner Tenner Smith in the 1957-1959 CBS television series, Trackdown.

Leeds appeared in three episodes of Perry Mason including Bill Emory in the 1958 episode "The Case of the Sunbather's Diary."

Leeds played federal agent LaMarr Kane in "The Scarface Mob", the pilot for ABC's The Untouchables TV series, a role taken over in the actual series by Chuck Hicks. He was a member of the casts of the 1958 version of The Betty White Show and The Buster Keaton Show, and made an appearance on Batman (Season 2, Episodes 29 and 30).

== USO tours ==
Leeds accompanied Bob Hope on 14 international USO (United Service Organizations) tours.

== Voice work ==
Leeds also did voices for animated television and film, including The Nine Lives of Fritz the Cat, Hong Kong Phooey, The New Yogi Bear Show, The Dukes, Challenge of the GoBots, CBS Storybreak, The Jetsons and was the narrator of The Quick Draw McGraw Show. He was also on the CBS radio program, The Stan Freberg Show along with Daws Butler and June Foray.

== Broadway ==
Leeds appeared on Broadway in the first cast of Sugar Babies along with Mickey Rooney and Ann Miller in 1979.

== Personal life and death ==
Leeds and his wife of 34 years, Pat Leeds, had a son, Dr. Michael Leeds. Leeds died of cancer at the age of 79, on November 12, 1996, in Los Angeles, California.

== American Federation of Television and Radio Artists ==
During the 1970s, Leeds spent five years as the president of the Los Angeles chapter of the American Federation of Television and Radio Artists (AFTRA). He later served on the actors' union's national and local Board of Directors. In 1992, AFTRA repaid his many years of service with its highest honor, the Gold Card. Leeds later served on the Board of Governors for the Academy of Television Arts & Sciences.

== Filmography ==
Year	Title	Role	Notes
1941	Public Enemies	Reporter	
1941	Pacific Blackout	Air Raid Warden	Uncredited
1942	Don Winslow of the Navy	Seaman Chapman	Serial
1942	Treat 'Em Rough	Davis	
1942	Priorities on Parade	Joe - Factory Employee / Show Coordinator	Uncredited
1942	The Secret Code	Henchman Carl Hiecke	Serial, [Ch. 9]
1942	I Married a Witch	Ambulance Attendant	Uncredited
1942	Reunion in France	Boy	Uncredited
1943	Lady Bodyguard	Intern	Uncredited
1943	Crash Dive	Shore Police	Uncredited
1946	That Brennan Girl	Bergie	Uncredited
1947	Hit Parade of 1947	Bandleader in Rehearsal Room	Uncredited
1949	The Life of Riley	Conway's Voice on Radio Show	Voice, Uncredited
1949	The Lady Gambles	Jack Harrison - Hotel Clerk	
1949	D.O.A.	Leo - Bartender	Uncredited
1950	Ma and Pa Kettle Go to Town	Tall Beautician	Uncredited
1950	South Sea Sinner	Second Policeman	Uncredited
1950	Saddle Tramp	Springer	
1950	Dial 1119	Martin, Wounded Policeman	Uncredited
1951	Up Front	Pinanski	Uncredited
1951	Katie Did It	'Odds' Burton	
1951	Ma and Pa Kettle Back on the Farm	Manson	
1951	The Frogmen	Pharmacist's Mate	Uncredited
1952	My Man and I	Man with Nancy at Bar	Uncredited
1952	Come Back, Little Sheba	Milkman	Uncredited
1953	Never Wave at a WAC	Nick Laharis	Uncredited
1953	Stalag 17	Barracks #1 Prisoner of War Getting Distillery	Uncredited
1953	99 River Street	Nat Finley	
1954	The Long, Long Trailer	Garage Manager	Uncredited
1954	Playgirl	Sharpie	Uncredited
1954	Brigadoon	Peter - Headwaiter	Uncredited
1954	The Adventures of Hajji Baba	Merchant	Uncredited
1954	Athena	Photographer	Uncredited
1954	The Last Time I Saw Paris	Barney	
1954	The Atomic Kid	Agent Bill	
1955	Six Bridges to Cross	Harris	Uncredited
1955	Hit the Deck	Lieutenant - Operation Mud Pie	Uncredited
1955	Tight Spot	Fred Packer	
1955	Interrupted Melody	Dr. Ed Ryson	
1955	Love Me or Leave Me	Fred Taylor	
1955	It's Always Fair Weather	Mr. Trasker	Uncredited
1955	Bobby Ware Is Missing	Mackey of F.B.I.	
1955	I'll Cry Tomorrow	Richard	
1955	Willy	Jerry Burke	Episode: "Franklin's Shoe Business"
1956	It's Always Jan	Newspaper reporter	Episode: "Guilty Conscience"
1956	The Price of Fear	Mitchell	Uncredited
1956	The Harder They Fall	Dundee Fight Ring Announcer	Uncredited
1956	Behind the High Wall	First Detective	
1956	Tea and Sympathy	Headmaster at Bonfire	Uncredited
1956	The Best Things in Life Are Free	Genius	Uncredited
1956	The Great American Pastime	Motor Cop	Uncredited
1957	Alfred Hitchcock Presents	Custodial Officer Charlie	Season 2 Episode 21: "Number Twenty-Two"
1957	Mr. Adams and Eve	Driver	Episode: "Howard Goes to Jail"
1957	Slander	Herb Goodman	Uncredited
1957	Official Detective	Patterson	Episode: "The Deserted House"
1957	Bombers B-52	TV Quiz Show Director	Uncredited
1957	Kiss Them for Me	Reporter in Nightclub	Uncredited
1957	The Silent Service	Red Bates	Season 1 Episode 34: "The Seashark Story"
1958	The Brothers Karamazov	Guard	Uncredited
1958	The Silent Service	Chief Davenport	Season 2 Episode 10: "Incident Down South"
1958	The Silent Service	Chief Electricians Mate John Babick	S2:E13, "The U.S.S. Cod's Lost Boarding Party"
1958	The Silent Service	Frank Kellogg	Season 2 Episode 30 "The Tautog Story"
1959	Perry Mason	Lou Caporale	S3:E9, "The Case of the Artful Dodger"
1959	The Scarface Mob	Lamarr Kane	TV movie
1958-1959	Trackdown	Tenner Smith	recurring role, 15 episodes
1959	High School Big Shot	Mr. Carter	
1959	The 30 Foot Bride of Candy Rock	Bill Burton	
1959	Leave It To Beaver	Theater Manager	Season 3 Episode 4: "Beaver's Prize"
1959	The Devil's Disciple	Narrator	Uncredited
1959	The Big Operator	Henland	Uncredited
1959	Girls Town	Michael Clyde	
1959	The Rookie	Seville Quare	
1960	Please Don't Eat the Daisies	Mackay's Secretary	Uncredited
1960	The Facts of Life	Thompson - the Dry Cleaner	
1961	The Tab Hunter Show	Gordon Harris	Episode: "Personal Appearance"
1961	The Investigators	Walter Keeler	Episode: "Death Leaves a Tip"
1961	The Dick Van Dyke Show	Policeman	Episode: "Harrison B Harding of Camp Crowder Mo" S1 E6
1963	The Alfred Hitchcock Hour	Andrew	Season 2 Episode 1: "A Home Away from Home"
1963	The Wheeler Dealers	Arthur Watkins	
1964	The Addams Family	Oscar Webber	"Morticia Joins the Ladies League"
1965	I'll Take Sweden	Car Salesman	Uncredited
1965	Harlow	Parker	
1966	I Dream of Jeannie	Big Charlie	"My Master, the Doctor", Season 1, Episode 20,
1966	The Oscar	Bert	
1966	The Bob Hope Vietnam Christmas Show	Actor	
1967	Rango	Raven	Episode "What's a Nice Girl Like You Doing Holding Up a Place Like This?"
1967	8 on the Lam	Marty	
1968	With Six You Get Eggroll	Police Officer Joelson	Uncredited
1972-1974	Adam-12	George Porter / Dennis Baker	2 episodes
1972	Mission: Impossible	John Larson	Episode: "The Deal"
1974	The Nine Lives of Fritz the Cat	Juan / Various Characters	Voice
1987	Dragnet	Roy Grest	
