= Naomi Tacuyan Underwood =

Filipina-American journalist and activist

- Born: Naomi Tuazon Tacuyan
- Education: New York University; University of California, Los Angeles
- Occupations: Journalist; activist
- Spouse: Ricardo Hurao Underwood (m. 2008)

Naomi Tacuyan Underwood (née Naomi Tuazon Tacuyan) is a Filipina-American journalist, and AAPI activist.

Underwood grew up in Guam after her family migrated there from the Philippines in the 1980s. In January, 2019 she was living in Annandale, Virginia.

She earned a bachelor's degree in journalism and Asian Pacific American studies from New York University, and a master's degree in public policy from UCLA. In December 2008, she married Ricardo Hurao Underwood, the third child of Robert A. Underwood.

In 2009, the Filipina Women's Network named her one of America's 100 most influential Filipina women. At the time, she was the deputy director of APIAVote.

In September 2010, she led the Democratic National Committee's outreach program to the AAPI community.

Underwood worked as the director of programs for the Faith & Politics Institute prior to becoming the executive director of the Asian American Journalists Association, serving in the latter role since January, 2019. She represented the association in a March 2021 meeting at the White House to discuss AAPI issues and how the Biden administration could address anti-Asian hate.
