= The Whisperer (radio program) =

US American old-time radio program

The Whisperer was an American old-time radio program which broadcast 13 episodes on late Sunday afternoons [5:00 p.m. Eastern] as a summer replacement from July 8 to September 30, 1951 on NBC. The tone of the show was often tongue-in-cheek, and satirized the radio crime dramas of the day. It was based on stories by Dr. Stetson Humphrey (in collaboration with his wife, Irene).

== Plot ==
Lawyer Philip Gault (Carleton G. Young), due to a college football injury, lost his voice and can only speak in an eerie whisper. Gault infiltrates "the syndicate" in his native Central City to bring down organized crime from within; to the underworld, he becomes known as the Whisperer. Later, his voice is restored through surgery, but he continues to lead a double life as the Whisperer, relaying instructions by telephone from the syndicate bosses in New York (who don't know he's a mole) to their lackeys in Central City, whom Gault is actually setting up.

In the prologue to the final episode from September 30, 1951 titled "Strange Bed Fellows", Philip Gault explains his history as follows:

"It all began ten years ago when I was kicked in the throat while playing college football. After the bandages were removed I opened my mouth to speak and all that came out was this rattling hiss. After a bakers dozen of women fainted when I spoke to them and countless babies went into paraclisms [sic] of crying, I disappeared from my usual haunts and went to work for a group which I later discovered were known as the crime syndicate. I decided to stay with them and collect sufficient evidence to help destroy them. Then one day I met Dr. Lee and through a miracle of surgery he restored my voice enabling me to resume my real identity as Philip Gault, Lawyer. This dual identity makes life very interesting. For if the syndicate ever finds out that the Whisperer, who passes on their orders, is really Philip Gault, the man who has wrecked so many of their plans, there'll be slow walking and low moaning. But I won't be around to comment on it."

Betty Moran portrayed Gault's girlfriend, Ellen Norris, the only person who knows Gault's double identity, other than Dr. Lee. Paul Frees occasionally appeared as Gault's "friend on the force", Lt. Charles Denvers. William Conrad frequently appeared in different supporting roles under his alias, "Julius Krelboyne", as he was under exclusive contract to CBS radio at the time.

Bill Karn was the producer-director (and occasional writer), and organist Johnny Duffy supplied the background music. Donald Rickles was the show's announcer.

The radio actor Carleton G. Young is sometimes confused with the film actor Carleton Scott Young.
