= Victor Bozeman =

American actor (1929–1986)

- Born: August 11, 1929; McLennan County, Texas, U.S.
- Died: November 26, 1986 (aged 57); Los Angeles, California
- Occupations: Television voice-over artist, actor

Victor Emanuel Bozeman (August 11, 1929 in McLennan County, Texas – November 26, 1986 in Los Angeles, California) was an American television announcer, voice-over artist, and actor.

== Career ==
In the 1950s, Bozeman was a disc jockey at WLIB in New York City. In the late 1960s and early 1970s, he appeared in supporting roles on such television programs as It Takes a Thief, Ironside, and Get Smart. He also played a "Black Reporter" in the 1970 pilot for McCloud.

By 1974, Bozeman had switched to announcing work and joined the staff of NBC in Burbank, California. At the time, he was one of the few African-Americans to make it in that field; on Bozeman's own network, for example, the closest equivalent was New York-based Fred Facey. From the mid-1970s to the first half of the 1980s, Bozeman was part of a nucleus of West Coast announcers employed by the network; his compatriots included Don Stanley, Donald Rickles, and Peggy Taylor.

Bozeman worked on some NBC network programs , but the majority of his duties consisted of live booth-announcing work - including promotional spots, bumpers, station identifications, program introductions, live tags and sign-offs - for the local network owned-and-operated station, KNBC. He alternated with his colleagues in introducing the station's NewsCenter 4 every night, and in being thanked on the air by anchor John Schubeck. Bozeman also anchored sign-on and sign-off editions of NewsCenter4 out-of-vision.

== Personal life ==
Bozeman died on November 26, 1986, at age 57.
