= Tinde Kovač Cerović =

Serbian educator and politician

Tinde Kovač Cerović (Serbian Cyrillic: Тинде Ковач Церовић; born 1954) is an educator and political figure in Serbia.

== Private life and academic career ==
Kovač Cerović holds a master's degree and a Ph.D. from the University of Belgrade's Department of Philosophy, where she is employed. She also teaches the psychology of education and educational policy in the university's Department of Psychology. She was active with Group MOST and the Centre for Antiwar Action during the Yugoslav Wars of the 1990s, was an advisor for educational policies at the Open Society Institute from 1999 to 2001, and was a senior advisor for the Roma Education Fund from 2005 to 2007.

Kovač Cerović was married to Stojan Cerović, a Serbian journalist and prominent opponent of Slobodan Milošević's administration in the 1990s. Cerović died in 2005.

== Administrative and political career ==
Kovač Cerović was Serbia's deputy minister of education from 2001 to 2004, during the premierships of Zoran Đinđić and Zoran Živković. In 2002, she indicated that the ministry was drafting a new policy for elementary and secondary schools, with specific plans for educational reform in Serbia's national minority communities. This followed a report from the Federal Republic of Yugoslavia's ministry of national and ethnic minorities indicating that as much as 78% of Serbia's Roma population and 70% of its Timok Vlach population were illiterate. The following year, Kovač Cerović helped secure the passage of reforms that were intended to raise the educational level of all students in Serbia; these changes were largely overturned in 2004 by the incoming administration of Vojislav Koštunica.

Kovač Cerović was later a special advisor to deputy prime minister Božidar Đelić on education and social issues from 2007 to 2008 and was state secretary in the ministry of education, science, and technological development between 2008 and 2012, during Mirko Cvetković's ministry. During her time in office, she was responsible for overseeing pre-university education as well as integration with the European Union and international co-operation in the field of education.

In August 2008, at the beginning of her tenure as state secretary, Kovač Cerović said that three of the most serious challenges facing Serbia's education system were a lack of equality among various groups, particularly Roma children; the fact that Serbia did not provide free educational materials such as textbooks and school meals; and a lack of competitiveness in a European education context. She gave an extended interview on Serbia's educational policies for the journal Vreme in 2010, promoting an inclusive approach to early education and defending a requirement that all students (unless specifically exempted) be required to attend school at age six and a half. She also condemned the past practice of sending large numbers of Roma children to special schools or special classes and highlighted the introduction of anti-discriminatory policies to target these activities.

There were rumours that Kovač Cerović would be appointed as Serbia's minister of education following the 2014 parliamentary election, when a new administration was formed under Aleksandar Vučić. She indicated that she would only accept the position if Boris Tadić's New Democratic Party joined the country's coalition government; it did not, and she was not appointed.

The New Democratic Party was reconstituted as the Social Democratic Party (Socijaldemokratska stranka, SDS) in October 2014, and Kovač Cerović was selected as one of its vice-presidents. The SDS contested the 2016 parliamentary election in alliance with the Liberal Democratic Party (LDP) and the League of Social Democrats of Vojvodina (LSV). Kovač Cerović was given the seventeenth position on their combined electoral list; the list won thirteen members, and she was not returned. She is currently the second SDS candidate in sequence with the right to accept a mandate if an elected SDS member leaves the assembly.
