= Don Stanley (announcer) =

American radio and television announcer

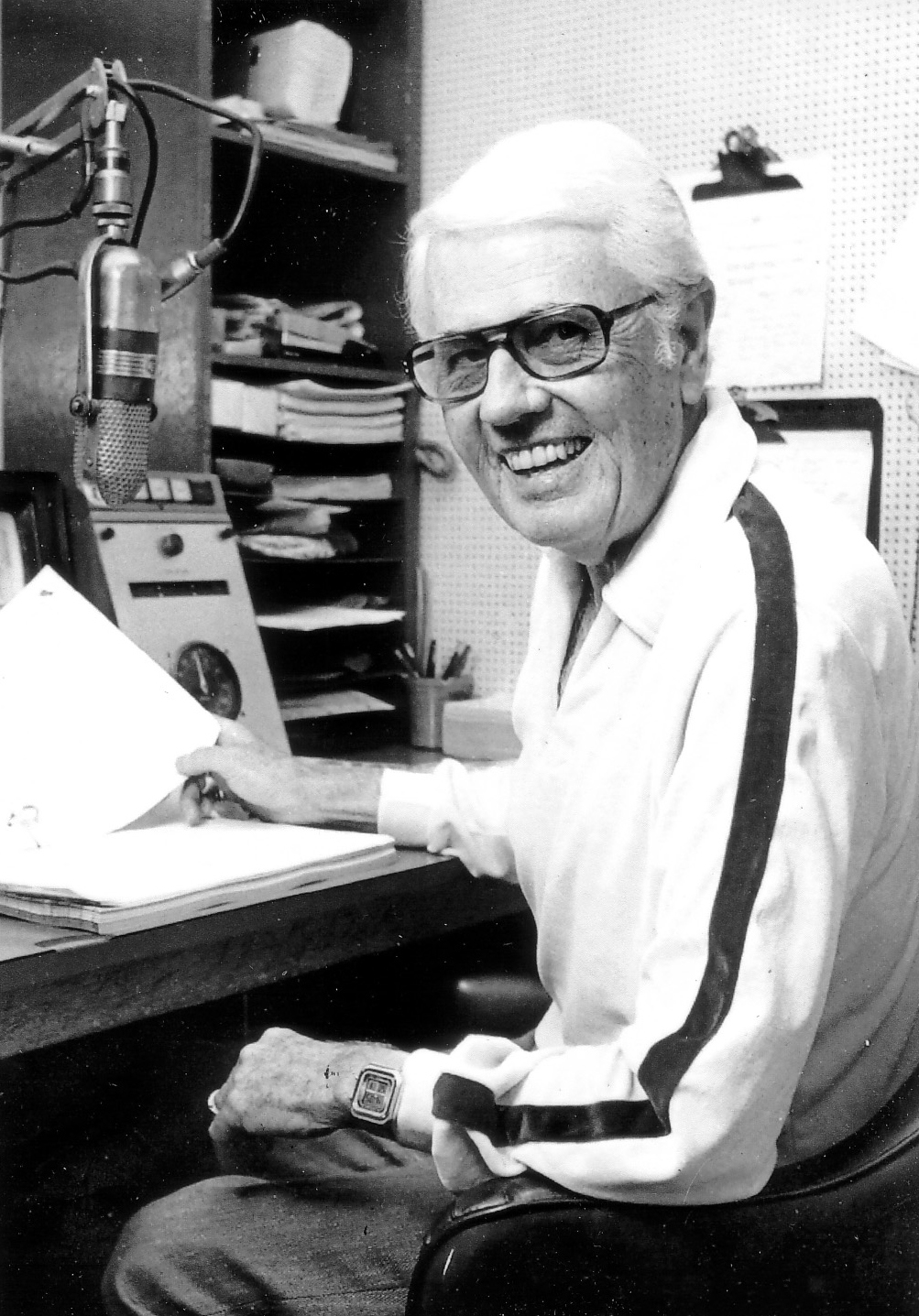
- Born: Donald Stanley Uglum; August 5, 1917; Stoughton, Wisconsin, US
- Died: January 20, 2003 (aged 85); Westlake Village, California, US
- Education: University of Wisconsin–Madison
- Occupations: Radio and television announcer
- Spouse: Elinore
- Children: 3

Donald Stanley Uglum (August 5, 1917, in Stoughton, Wisconsin – January 20, 2003, in Westlake Village, California), known professionally as Don Stanley, was an American radio and television announcer.

== Career ==
Stanley was born in Stoughton and attended the University of Wisconsin–Madison, where he was part of the University Players. His announcing career began at the university's radio station, WHA (AM). From there, he went to WIBA-AM in Madison, Wisconsin, and in 1940 joined WTMJ in Milwaukee, where he inaugurated the station's FM outlet (now WKTI) as a staff announcer and news commentator.

After a brief stint as an announcer with ABC in Chicago, Stanley joined NBC in Hollywood in 1946 and became part of the network's West Coast announcing staff for the next 46 years. He was part of a "core" group that included the likes of Arch Presby, Eddy King, and Frank Barton; in later years, among his colleagues would be Donald Rickles, Victor Bozeman, and Peggy Taylor. His tenure with NBC was on par with such New York-based network staff announcers as Don Pardo, Bill Wendell, Wayne Howell, and Howard Reig. During World War II, he served in the United States Navy and also did announcing work for the Armed Forces Radio Service.

During the "golden age" of old-time radio, Stanley's voice was heard on such shows as The Bill Stern Colgate Sports Newsreel, The NBC University Theatre, The Adventures of The Saint, The Halls of Ivy, The Edgar Bergen and Charlie McCarthy Show, The New Adventures of Nero Wolfe, Presenting Charles Boyer, and Father Knows Best.

After moving to the television side in the 1950s (and, eventually, to their later studios in Burbank, California), he handled announcing duties for such television programs as The Sheilah Graham Show, One Man's Family, The Spike Jones Show, and NBC Saturday Night at the Movies.

Stanley's voice was also heard introducing NewsCenter 4 on the network's Los Angeles flagship station, KNBC, where he handled live on-air continuity duties and anchored local newscasts out-of-vision at sign-on and sign-off. His long run with the network ended around 1992.

== Personal life ==
He was married to his high school sweetheart, Elinore, for 63 years. They had three children: Jon, Kristin and Donna.

Stanley died of complications from cancer of the small intestine at age 85. His wife, Elinore, died on October 31, 2011, at age 94.
