= The Silent Service (TV series) =

1957 American television series

- Genre: Anthology
- Presented by: Thomas M. Dykes
- Country of origin: United States
- Original language: English
- No. of seasons: 2
- No. of episodes: 78

Production
- Running time: 30 minutes

Original release
- Network: Syndication
- Release: 1957 – 1958

The Silent Service is an American anthology television series that aired in syndication from March 1957 to 1958 for a total of 78 half-hour episodes.

The series featured documentary-style dramas about the United States Navy's submarine fleet during World War II and the Korean War.
