= Nancy Yoshihara =

American journalist

Nancy Yoshihara is an American journalist. In 1981 she co-founded the Asian-American Journalists Association with the goal of representing Asian Americans and their perspectives in U.S. newsrooms and in the media. For many years she worked for The Los Angeles Times as an editorial writer, features writer, and reporter. She later served as content manager for the University of Southern California Annenberg's Knight Digital Media Center, where she developed programs and materials on the innovative use of digital media. Her published works include a 1992 study of Asian American demographics and changing experiences in the United States.

== Education, career, and family ==
Nancy Yoshihara developed her interests in journalism while studying English as an undergraduate at UCLA.

In 1981, with colleagues Bill Sing and David Kishiyama (also then from The Los Angeles Times), Frank Kwan and Tritia Toyota (then of KNBC-TV News), and Dwight Chuman (from Rafu Shimpo, a local Japanese-American newspaper), she co-founded the Asian-American Journalists Association (AAJA), an organization that has grown to represent Asian Americans and Pacific Islander (AAPI) people more broadly. This organization originally started in Los Angeles but grew beyond it. By 2021, when the 2021 marked its fortieth anniversary, the organization reported having 1,600 members across the United States and Asia, with almost a third of these students, some of whom participate in internship programs that try to increase AAPI representation in the journalistic profession. The organization also aims to ensure accuracy and fairness in the representation of AAPI people in the media.

In 1989, Yoshihara, representing The Los Angeles Times, held a Jefferson Fellowship from the East-West Center.

In 1992, Yoshihara wrote a book with Stanley Karnow (an expert on Vietnamese history and the Vietnam War). Their book, entitled, Asian Americans in Transition, surveyed changing Asian American demographics and experiences in the United States in educational, professional, and other spheres. It contained a foreword by Daniel K. Inouye, who served as U.S. Senator from Hawaii from 1963 to 2012.

Yoshihara reported on a wide variety of issues during her years with The Los Angeles Times, including topics related to Asian-Americans. In 1997, for example, she discussed the 1992 Los Angeles riots with reference to the experiences of inner city Korean-American merchants whose stores became targets for violence but who found many police unresponsive. She narrated the story through interviews with one Korean-American activist, Angela Oh.

In 1997, while reporting for The Los Angeles Times and serving as president of the Asian-American Journalists Association, Yoshihara spoke on C-Span 1997 about "The Price of Asian Political Involvement", while also giving an analysis of national and international news for the program's "Washington Report". In this interview she described the Asian-American experience in 1997 as a "political rollercoaster" following the election of the first Asian American as a governor: this was Chinese-American Gary Locke in Washington state. She also discussed stereotypes that Asian-Americans faced in popular cinema, including Charlie-Chan-style portrayals and via martial arts movies. She referred to popular representations in American media that questioned the loyalty of Asian Americans by suggesting potential Asian (and in the case of Locke) Chinese influence on American politics.

Yoshihara analyzed opportunities and challenges manifest by online journalism, and its relationship to print journalism. She co-authored a report with Jon Funabiki, an advocate of social justice journalism, in 2011 entitled Online Journalism Enterprises: From Startup to Sustainability. Their report was sponsored by the Renaissance Journalism Center, a partnership between San Francisco State University’s Journalism Department and ZeroDivide (an organization that supported businesses developing online platforms), with funds from the William and Flora Hewlett Foundation. Yoshihara and Funabiki identified business-side challenges that many journalistic entrepreneurs were facing. Starting new online news sources was easy, they argued; maintaining and growing them, and keeping them financially solvent, was hard.

Yoshihara was married to Earl Gustkey, who worked as a sportswriter for the Los Angeles Times for more than thirty years, and who died in 2009.

Yoshihara currently works as the Media and Communications liaison for the Los Angeles County Arboretum & Botanic Garden.
