= Asian American Journalists Association =

US non-profit organization

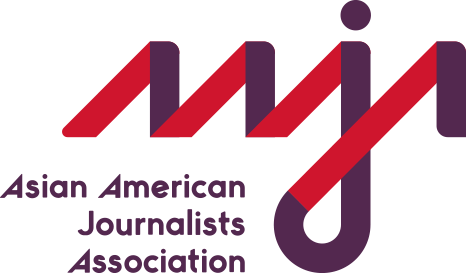
- Abbreviation: AAJA
- Formation: 1981; 45 years ago
- Founded at: Los Angeles, California
- Type: Nonprofit organization
- Purpose: Professional association
- Headquarters: Washington, D.C.
- Members: 2,000
- President: Nicole Dungca
- Executive Director: Naomi Tacuyan Underwood
- Website: aaja.org

The Asian American Journalists Association (AAJA) is a 501(c)(3) nonprofit educational and professional organization based in Washington, D.C., with more than 1,500 members and 21 chapters across the United States and Asia. The current president is Washington Post reporter Nicole Dungca. The executive director is Naomi Tacuyan Underwood.

The organization's goals are:

- To provide a means of association and support among Asian American and Pacific Islander (AAPI) journalists, and to advance AAPI journalists as news managers and media executives.
- To provide encouragement, information, advice and scholarship assistance to AAPI students who aspire to professional journalism careers.
- To provide to the AAPI community an awareness of news media and an understanding of how to gain fair access.
- To research and point out when news media organizations stray from accuracy and fairness in the coverage of Asian Americans and Pacific Islanders and AAPI issues.

The organization is open to anyone who works in media and identifies as Asian American or is an ally. AAJA's diverse membership includes broadcast anchors, print reporters, editors, producers, videographers, columnists, photojournalists, freelancers, academics, professors, students as well as those who work in film and online media. The membership also consists of many associates in business and public relations sectors. Close to one-third of AAJA's members are students.

== History ==
The Asian American Journalists Association (AAJA) was founded in 1981 by several Los Angeles–based Asian American journalists: Bill Sing, Nancy Yoshihara, and David Kishiyama (from The Los Angeles Times), Frank Kwan and Tritia Toyota (from KNBC-TV News), and Dwight Chuman (from Rafu Shimpo, the Japanese-American newspaper). Their goal was to support greater participation by Asian Americans in the news media and to ensure fair and accurate portrayals. The AAJA also aimed to encourage high school and college students through scholarship and internships as a way of increasing Asian American representation in the journalistic profession. The founders also wanted to enhance and improve the representation Asian Americans in mainstream mass media.

Inspired by the creation of the National Association of Black Journalists in 1975 as well as the Los Angeles–based California Chicano News Media Association, Sing, a 23-year-old Los Angeles Times reporter at the time, serendipitously met KNBC-TV anchor Tritia Toyota at a student night at UCLA in 1981 and consequently mentioned the idea of forming a similar organization. The two would soon become the leaders of the Original Six who got together in Los Angeles' Little Tokyo Service Center to form AAJA. The other members of the Original Six were David Kishiyama and Nancy Yoshihara of the Los Angeles Times, TV producer Frank Kwan, and Dwight Chuman, an editor of a local Japanese American newspaper.

Envisioned as a professional and educational group, AAJA attracted 50 Asian American journalists at its first social event. "There were more Asian American journalists under one roof than I ever imagined were in the business," said Kishiyama. "We all immediately drew strength from one another, and the feeling of isolation I had felt evaporated overnight."

Building on the momentum of the first social event, the founders knew they had to spread the word that AAJA was out there. A scholarship banquet was organized and NBC News anchor Tom Brokaw was the featured speaker for the event. More than 350 supporters, including city officials, media company representatives, and community folks attended the banquet. The dinner raised $18,000 for scholarships.

Despite the banquet's success, there was still skepticism at the time among journalists who were leery about being part of AAJA or similar organizations. The founders understood the predicament of being professionally independent and being part of an organization that was political in nature. But it was also around this time that some of the nation's newsrooms were starting to develop programs to recruit minorities into the industry. Many of the newsrooms seeking help in reaching parity in their newsrooms turned to minority journalism organizations like AAJA, the National Association of Black Journalists and the National Association of Hispanic Journalists, which was founded in 1984.

By 1985, AAJA had 100 dues-paying members scattered across the country. AAJA's first executive director, Karen Seriguchi, was hired and soon chapters were formed in San Francisco, Sacramento, Washington, D.C., Hawaii and San Diego. By July 1987, membership reached 350 and more chapters were formed, including Detroit, Chicago, New York, Portland, New England, Florida and Denver.

== Chapters ==
There are 19 chapters in the United States and one chapter representing Asia members. California alone has four chapters: Los Angeles, San Francisco, San Diego, and Sacramento. In addition to Los Angeles, the largest chapters are New York, San Francisco, Seattle, Washington, D.C., and the Asia chapter. Members who do not geographically reside in any of the chapter cities are considered at-large members and include journalists spanning the globe from Paris to Bangladesh.

- Arizona
- Asia
- Atlanta
- Arizona
- At-Large (No Chapter)
- Chicago
- Florida
- Hawaii
- Los Angeles
- Michigan
- Minnesota
- New England
- New York
- North Carolina
- Philadelphia
- Portland
- Sacramento
- San Diego
- San Francisco Bay Area
- Seattle
- Texas
- Washington, D.C.

== Affinity groups ==
AAJA affinity groups are specialized groups of AAJA members organized by vocation or interest, each led by a director or co-director. They strive to recruit new members and identify and pursue training and networking opportunities that meet members' evolving and unique needs, as well as connect current AAJA members regardless of geography or career level.

- Enterprise
- Freelance
- Features Forum
- Photojournalists
- Radio and Podcasting
- Small Market Broadcast Journalists
- Sports Task Force
- Video
- Women and Non-Binary Voices
- Young Professionals Network (Yung AAJA)
- News Nerds
- Small market Broadcast Journalists (SBJ)

== National conference ==
AAJA holds an annual conference each summer in the United States where more than 800 Asian American journalists and allies attend each year for the workshops, plenaries, keynote speakers, job fair, and awards banquet. The three-day conference is the largest gathering of Asian journalists in the world. The conference has been held annually since 1987. Speakers, including keynote speakers, have included news pioneers Al Neuharth and Connie Chung, former United States President Bill Clinton, former United States Surgeon General Vivek Murthy, civil rights leader John Lewis and former international correspondent-anchor for NBC News Ann Curry.

Yearly sponsors of the conference have included the major network news stations (ABC, NBC, CBS, Fox), newspapers (The New York Times, The Wall Street Journal), sports media (ESPN), online media (Vox Media, Bleacher Report) as well as universities with journalism programs (Columbia University, CUNY, University of Southern California).

Cities with large media industries as well as large Asian populations are often chosen as hosts. Recent host cities include Atlanta, Houston, Philadelphia, Las Vegas, San Francisco, Los Angeles, Washington D.C. and New York City. The AAJA 2024 conference will be held in Austin, Texas from August 7 through August 11.

The Asia chapter holds its own conference annually.

== National programs ==
AAJA has several programs that cater to different experience levels within its membership, starting from high school to mid-career professionals. The programs run annually with application windows open either at the end of the calendar year, or at the beginning of the new year. Programs are funded with foundation support and contributions from media sponsors.

=== VOICES (College Program) ===
Voices is a summer multimedia journalism fellowship for undergraduate and graduate college students. Each year, a group of students are selected to work remotely part-time to report on issues related to Asian Americans. Professional mentors guide students through their assignments and provide a newsroom experience. Students also attend remote trainings while they work on their assignments in groups. Students that participate in the Voices newsroom are invited to the AAJA National Convention at the end of the summer to present their reports and to attend the convention. Travel and lodging are covered for students who are selected to participate.

Since its founding in 1990, Voices has graduated hundreds of students who would go on to work in the media industry. The program's cohort of graduates include 27 published authors, 15 Emmy Award winners, seven Pulitzer Prize recipients, four Edward R. Murrow Award winners and two Peabody Award winners.

=== JCamp (High School Program) ===
JCamp is a selective national journalism program for high school students. It strives to confront the lack of diversity within the industry, in regards to race, religion, identity, geography, sexual orientation and socioeconomic status. The six-day training brings together a multicultural group of teenagers to sharpen journalism skills and work together in a unique learning environment. The curriculum consists of interactive workshops, hands-on training and field trips that emphasize cross-cultural communication, ethics, leadership and networking. Students demonstrate a keen interest in broadcast, newspaper, magazine, photojournalism or online media. JCamp is open to high school freshmen, sophomores and juniors from all backgrounds. There is no fee to apply and all expenses are covered.

The program was founded in 2001 by Star Tribune reporter Neal Justin, Sacramento Bee reporter Josh Freedom du Lac and Philadelphia Daily News reporter Mark Angeles as a response to the media industry's diversity crisis. More than 750 students have graduated JCamp since its inception, and alumni have been recognized with the highest honors in the news business. Approximately 75% of the program's graduates have gone on to pursue a journalism degree after graduating high school.

Speakers have included Hoda Kotb, co-host of NBC's Today Show; Kevin Merida, editor-in-chief of The Undefeated; Arthur Ochs Sulzberger Jr., publisher of The New York Times; Jemele Hill, writer for The Atlantic; Wesley Lowery, correspondent for 60 Minutes; Seung Min Kim, White House reporter at the Washington Post; Cheryl Diaz Meyer, Pulitzer Prize–winning photographer; Byron Pitts, co-anchor of Nightline; Chuck Todd, host of Meet the Press; talk show host Jimmy Kimmel; Jill Abramson, former executive editor of The New York Times; Carl Bernstein, the Pulitzer Prize–winning Watergate reporter; Tucker Carlson, anchor for Fox News; David Rhodes, former president of CBS News; Soledad O'Brien, former CNN anchor; Bob Schieffer, former moderator of Face the Nation; Gwen Ifill, former co-host of PBS NewsHour; and Dennis Swanson, creator of The Oprah Winfrey Show.

MSNBC anchor Richard Lui, former CNN anchor Joie Chen, Politico deputy editor Clea Benson, former AAJA President Paul Cheung, Minnesota Public Radio President Duchesne Drew, Associated Press reporter Bobby Calvan and Star Tribune photo editor Kyndell Harkness have all taught at the program. Alumni have been recognized with the highest honors in journalism, including more than a dozen Emmy Awards, the Peabody Award and the Pulitzer Prize. Alums include filmmaker Jeff Orlowski, news anchor Terrell Brown, Washington Post reporter Arelis Hernandez, Wall Street Journal photo editor Timmy Huynh, ESPN reporter Brett Okamoto, CNN producer Julia Chan, CNN reporter Brian Fung, The Courier-Journal reporter Alfred Miller, Los Angeles Times reporter Sandhya Kambhampati, filmmaker Adam Khalil, reporter Taylor Mirfendereski and fitness entrepreneur Jackelyn Ho.

=== Executive Leadership Program (ELP) ===
The Executive Leadership Program is a week-long professional development workshop committed to journalistic excellence and leadership training. The program provides targeted professional development to diverse, high-potential, ambitious, and community-minded professionals. ELP also provides follow-up trainings for graduates at the annual AAJA National Convention. The program is open to all journalists who apply, regardless of membership to AAJA.

The program has trained more than 500 media professionals since 1995. In 2018, ELP was held at the City University of New York (CUNY). In 2019, the 24th class of ELP held its program at ABC News in New York City. Also in 2019, the program expanded to include an inaugural ELP Asia with the program held in Hong Kong.

=== Mentor Match ===
The yearlong mentoring program pairs mentees with experienced mentors in the media industry in the United States as well as in Asia, through AAJA's Asia chapter. Applications for both mentors and mentees usually open by the end of the calendar year, with matches announced by March of the following year. Several factors are used in determining mentor/mentee pairings, including geography, gender, medium (print, online, broadcast, photography, etc.), and career interests. In recent years, Mentor Match has been able to provide mentors who work outside of traditional newsroom positions, including those who work as data journalists or as documentary film producers.

In 2018, 130 mentor/mentee matches were made with applications coming from 27 states and internationally. Out of the mentors in the 2018 class, 51% had more than 10 years of experience. On the other end, 43% of mentees were students and 49% had less than five years of experience.

== Media Watch ==
AAJA Media Watch is a civic engagement committee consisted of AAJA members who are media professionals. The committee seeks to hold media organizations accountable to standards of accuracy and fairness in the coverage of Asian Americans and Pacific Islanders and their issues. In consultation with AAJA's president, the all-volunteer committee considers and issues statements on AAJA's behalf.

In 2016, AAJA Media Watch issued a statement demanding an apology from Fox News for a segment aired on October 3 that mocked Asian Americans in New York's Chinatown. The segment by Jesse Watters of The O'Reilly Factor was called "offensive" by The Washington Post and Sen. Brian Schatz of Hawaii said Watters "should be ashamed." AAJA also met privately with an O'Reilly Factor executive producer, along with other national and local community leaders, at the Museum of Chinese in America in New York City.

AAJA Media Watch issued guidance in February 2020 urging news outlets to refrain from images and language that fuel xenophobia and racism amid the COVID-19 outbreak. Following that in March, Media Watch issued a joint statement along with other media organization partners denouncing the escalating violence and anti-Asian rhetoric aimed at Asian Americans and Pacific Islanders, including journalists, amid the pandemic.

== Achievements ==
AAJA is one of the founding organizations and a partner organization of UNITY: Journalists of Color, Inc. along with the National Association of Black Journalists (NABJ), the National Association of Hispanic Journalists (NAHJ), and the Indigenous Journalists Association (IJA).

In 2019, the Features forum of the AAJA teamed up with the African American Film Critics Association (AAFCA), GALECA: The Society of LGBTQ Entertainment Critics, the Latino Entertainment Journalists Association (LEJA), the Online Association of Female Film Critics (OAFFC) and Time's Up Entertainment to form the Critics Groups for Equality in Media to help foster greater diversity in entertainment journalism through various initiatives including a "watchdog" grading system.

On April 2, 2021, the Los Angeles chapter of the Society of Professional Journalists co-sponsored an event celebrating the AAJA's 40th anniversary, calling the organization a "vital resource for journalists reporting on the rise of anti-Asian racism and hate crimes."
