= Teen (magazine) =

Defunct American teen and lifestyle magazine

- Cover of Teen's Winter 2007 issue
- Editor-in-chief: Jane Fort
- Categories: Teen, lifestyle
- Publisher: Hearst Corporation; Jayne Jamison
- First issue: 1957
- Final issue: Winter 2009
- Country: United States
- Based in: Santa Monica, California
- Language: English
- ISSN: 1934-5348

Teen was an American teen and lifestyle magazine for teenage girls. The content of Teen included advice, entertainment news, quizzes, fashion, beauty, celebrity role models, and "real-girl stories". The magazine was published between 1957 and 2009.

== Publication history ==
Teen was launched in 1957, initially with a leading apostrophe in the title.

In 1999, the magazine — along with the Petersen Publishing Company's other titles — was sold by Peterson to Emap. Primedia (now Rent Group) acquired Teen in 2000, but it was shut down in 2002 (other than special issues like Teen Prom). Hearst Magazines bought Primedia's teen magazine titles (including Teen and Seventeen) in 2003, reviving Teen.

=== Closure ===
Following the closure of its Cosmogirl in October 2008, Hearst Magazines decided in December 2008 to end publication of Teen magazine. The winter 2009 issue was the last. A spokesperson said, "We will continue to publish the annual Teen Prom issue, but will focus our teen publishing efforts on the Seventeen brand." The spokesperson also noted that teenmag.com would be absorbed into the Hearst Teen Network of sites over the next month.

== Content ==
The magazine had nine sections: New Stuff, Tech Girl, Celeb Stuff, Celebs, Look, Fashion, Get Real, Absolutely You, and More:

- New Stuff — anything recently released that was attractive to the magazine's readership, such as technology, accessories, clothes, and makeup.
- Tech Girl — about technology, especially "trendy" technology and game reviews.
- Celeb Stuff — reviews of movies, television shows, books, and music, young celebrity quotes, celebrity fashion and makeup tips, and a celebrity style quiz.
- Celebs — celebrity facts, quotes, essays, and predictions, as well as occasional posters of teen stars and a quiz.
- Look — beauty articles, such as those concerning hair and makeup.
- Fashion — clothing section that talked about knits, jeans, clothes for individual body shapes, crafts, and a quiz.
- Get Real — articles written by actual teenagers. Articles included "True Stories from Real Teens", where teens send in their personal essays, "Ask Sophi", an advice column for dating questions, and a quiz.
- Absolutely You — advice and quizzes about readers' personal lives, crushes, and bodies.
- More — at the end of the magazine; included fortune telling, a fictional story, horoscopes, comics, and "Why Me?", a collection of embarrassing stories from readers' real-life experiences.

== Music ==
The magazine released Teen Mag Music 2000 Volume 1, a compilation music CD.
