= 2024 United States Senate elections in California =

Elections for California's class 1 Senate seat

- November 5, 2024
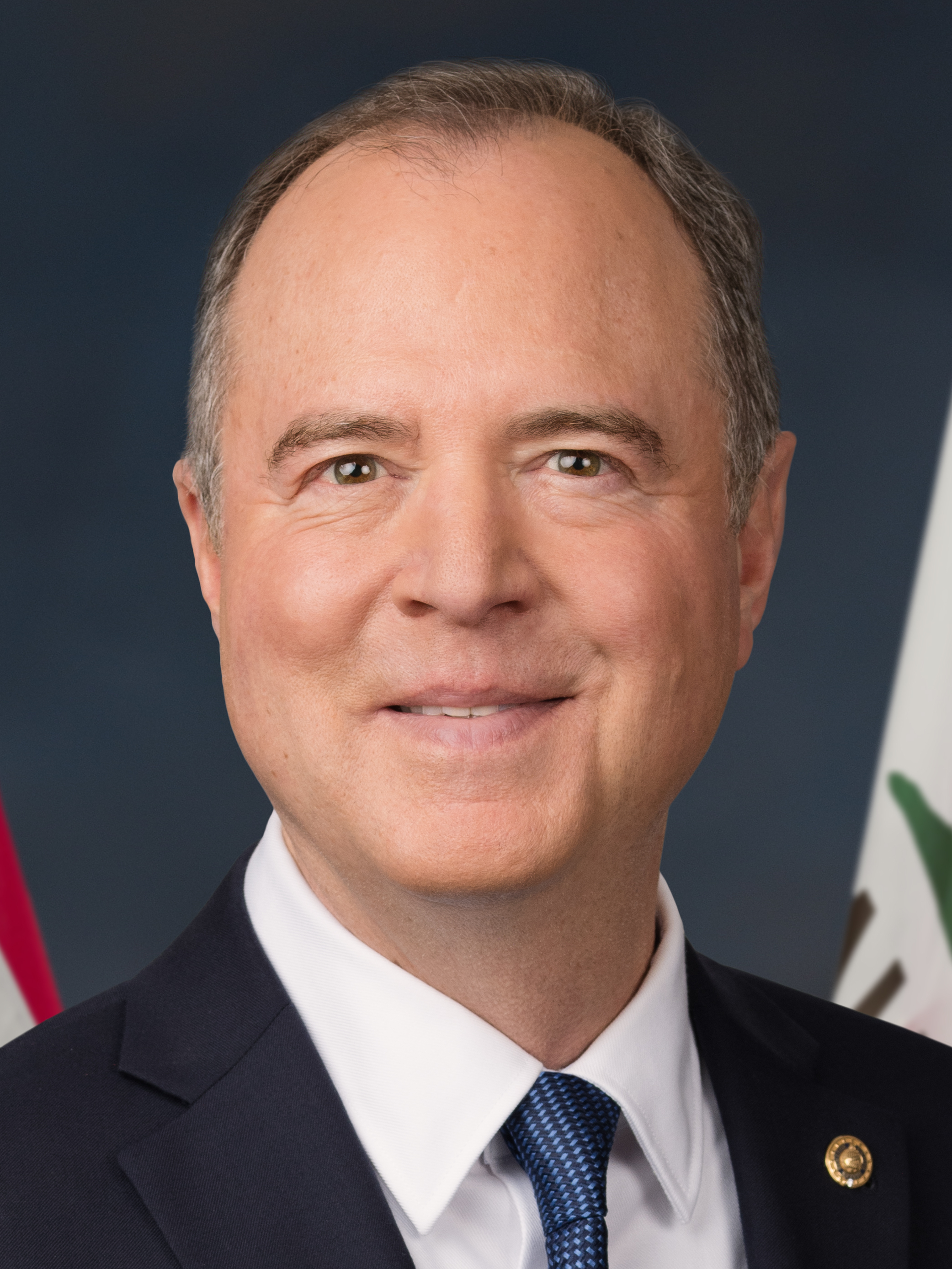

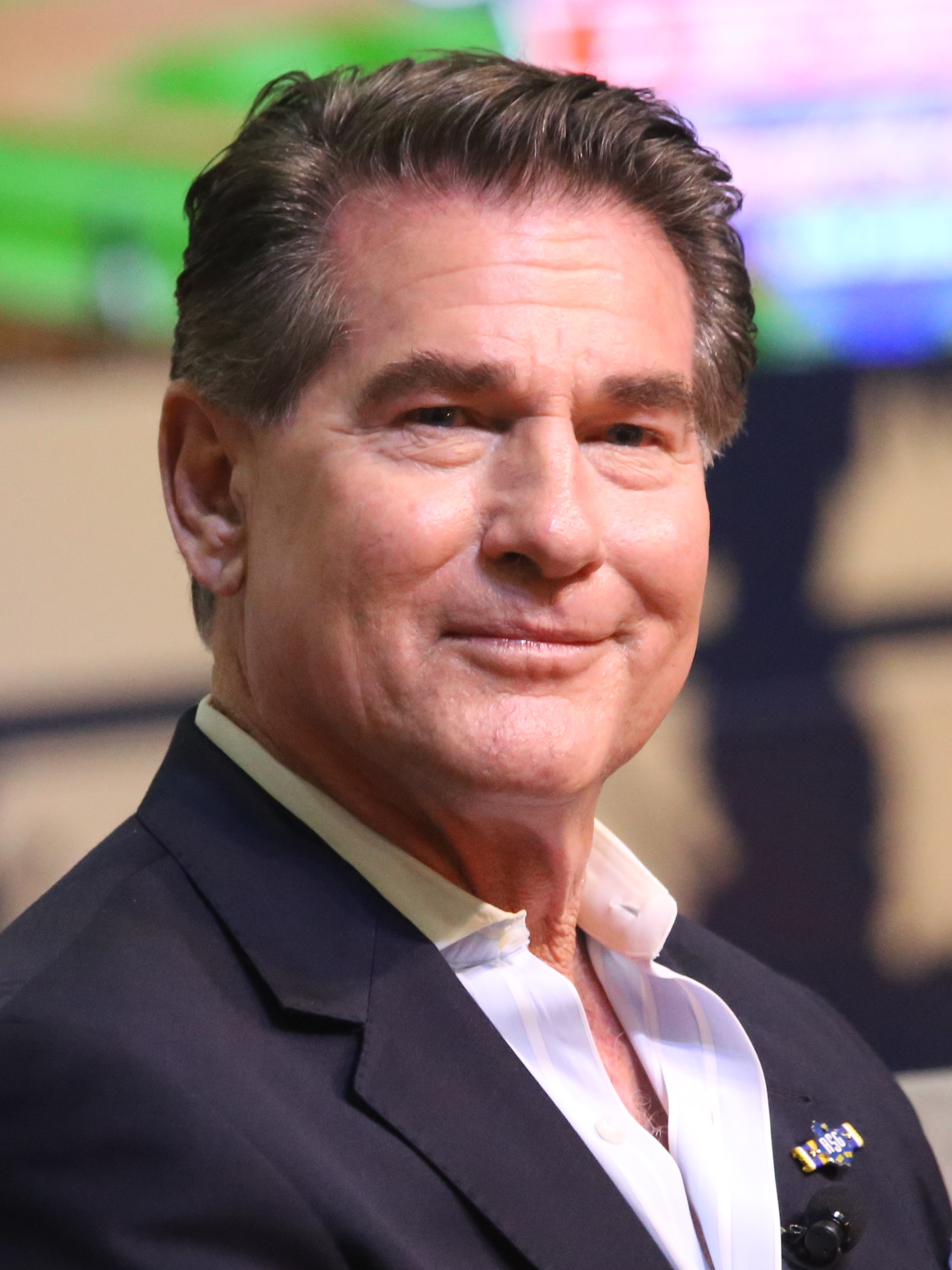
| Candidate | Adam Schiff | Steve Garvey |
| Party | Democratic | Republican |
| Regular election | 9,036,252; 58.87% | 6,312,594; 41.13% |
| Special election | 8,837,051; 58.75% | 6,204,637; 41.25% |
- Schiff: 50–60% 60–70% 70–80% 80–90% Garvey: 50–60% 60–70% 70–80%
U.S. senator before election
Laphonza Butler (Note: In October 2023, Butler was appointed by Governor Gavin Newsom to fill the vacancy caused by the death of Senator Dianne Feinstein.)
Democratic
Elected U.S. senator
Adam Schiff
Democratic

Two 2024 United States Senate elections in California were held on November 5, 2024, to elect a member of the United States Senate to represent the state of California. There were two ballot items for the same Class 1 seat: a special election to fill the seat for the final month of the 118th United States Congress (ending on January 3, 2025), and a regular general election for a full term that began on January 3, 2025, in the 119th United States Congress. This was the second time in a row that both a regular and special election for the U.S. Senate occurred simultaneously in California, following the 2022 elections.

Two Democratic U.S. representatives, Katie Porter of Irvine and Adam Schiff of Burbank, entered the race for the 119th Congress before February 14, 2023, when fellow Democrat Dianne Feinstein announced that she would retire at the end of her term. A third, Barbara Lee of Oakland, announced her campaign on February 21, 2023. Feinstein died in office on September 29, 2023. On October 1, 2023, California Governor Gavin Newsom appointed Laphonza Butler to fill Feinstein's term until a special election could be held in November 2024 to fill the last month of Feinstein's term. On October 19, 2023, Butler announced that she would not seek election to finish the final month of Feinstein's term, nor for a full Senate term in the 119th Congress.

Primary elections took place on March 5, 2024, during Super Tuesday. California uses a nonpartisan blanket primary election, in which all candidates regardless of party affiliation appear on the same primary ballot and the two highest-placing candidates advance to the general election; however, primary special election winners can win outright if they win more than 50% of the vote in the first round. Schiff, along with Republican former baseball player Steve Garvey, advanced to the general election in both the special and regular elections. As no Republican has won a Senate election in California since 1988, Schiff was considered a heavy favorite, and easily won both the regular and special general elections with more than 58% of the vote.

Schiff became the first male U.S. senator from this seat since John Seymour left office in 1992. Schiff's popular vote total of 9 million in the regular election broke the record previously held by Feinstein in 2012 for the highest vote total ever received by a U.S. Senate candidate in American history, as well as the highest vote total ever received by a candidate for any office in any state outside of the presidency.

With over 41% of the vote in the general election, Garvey had the best performance of any Republican candidate for this seat since 1994. Garvey managed to win Orange County, which voted for Kamala Harris in the concurrent presidential election. He also flipped three counties compared to the 2022 Senate election: Lake, Imperial, and San Joaquin counties.

== Background ==
California is considered to be a safe blue state at the federal and state levels, with Joe Biden winning the state by a margin of 29.16% in the 2020 presidential election. Democrats currently hold a large majority in California's U.S. House delegation, all statewide offices (including both U.S. Senate seats), and supermajorities in both of California's state legislative chambers.

Prior to the 2024 election, senator Dianne Feinstein had served in Congress since being elected in a 1992 special election, defeating Republican appointee John Seymour. During her career, she was re-elected five times, winning in 1994, 2000, 2006, 2012, and most recently in 2018, where she defeated fellow Democrat Kevin de León with 54.2% of the vote. At the time of her death, Feinstein was the most senior Democrat in the Senate, and is the longest serving U.S. senator in California's history.

== Candidates ==
=== Democratic Party ===
==== Advanced to general ====
- Adam Schiff, U.S. representative for California's 30th congressional district (2001–2024)

==== Eliminated in primary ====
- Sepi Gilani, UC San Diego professor and surgeon
- Harmesh Kumar, psychologist and perennial candidate
- Barbara Lee, U.S. representative for California's 12th congressional district (1998–2025) (endorsed Schiff in general election)
- Christina Pascucci, former KTLA news anchor
- David Peterson, tech professional and perennial candidate
- Douglas Pierce, cold case investigator and candidate for U.S. Senate in 2018 and 2022
- Katie Porter, U.S. representative for California's 47th congressional district (2019–2025) (endorsed Schiff in general election)
- Perry Pound, investment firm CEO
- Raji Rab, commercial pilot and perennial candidate
- John Rose, office manager and political children's book author

==== Withdrew ====
- Denard Ingram, psychologist and social worker
- Lexi Reese, investor and former Google executive

==== Declined ====
- Rob Bonta, 34th attorney general of California (2021–present) (endorsed Lee and Porter)
- London Breed, 45th mayor of San Francisco (2018–2025) (endorsed Lee, ran for re-election)
- Laphonza Butler, incumbent U.S. senator (2023–2024)
- Ro Khanna, U.S. representative for California's 17th congressional district (2017–present) (endorsed Lee, ran for re-election)
- Eleni Kounalakis, 50th lieutenant governor of California (2019–present) (ran for governor, then state treasurer in 2026)
- Fiona Ma, California state treasurer (2019–present) (endorsed Lee, running for lieutenant governor in 2026)
- Holly Mitchell, Los Angeles County supervisor (2020–2021, 2025–present) (ran for re-election)
- Gavin Newsom, 40th governor of California (2019–present)
- Libby Schaaf, 50th mayor of Oakland (2015–2023) (endorsed Lee)
- Eric Swalwell, U.S. representative for California's 14th congressional district (2013–2026) and candidate for president in 2020 (ran for re-election)
- Oprah Winfrey, talk show host and media proprietor

=== Republican Party ===
==== Advanced to general ====
- Steve Garvey, former professional baseball player for the Los Angeles Dodgers and the San Diego Padres

==== Eliminated in primary ====
- Sharletta Bassett, farmer
- James Bradley, healthcare executive and perennial candidate
- Eric Early, attorney and perennial candidate
- Denice Gary-Pandol, former educator
- Sarah Sun Liew, businesswoman, candidate for U.S. Senate in 2022, and candidate for California's 33rd congressional district in 2020
- Jim Macauley, sales associate and candidate for California's 20th congressional district in 2022
- Jonathan Reiss, multimedia consultant and candidate for California's 25th congressional district in 2022
- Stefan Simchowitz, art dealer
- Martin Veprauskas, retired defense contractor

==== Write-in candidates ====
- Danny Fabricant, retired sliding door repairman and convicted felon
- Carlos Guillermo Tapia, realtor and candidate for U.S. Senate in 2022

==== Declined ====
- Lanhee Chen, Stanford University professor and runner-up for California state controller in 2022
- Larry Elder, radio host, former candidate for president in 2024, and candidate for Governor of California in the 2021 recall election
- Kevin Faulconer, 38th mayor of San Diego (2014–2020) and candidate for Governor of California in the 2021 recall election (ran for San Diego County Board of Supervisors)

=== Libertarian Party ===
==== Eliminated in primary ====
- Gail Lightfoot, former chair of the California Libertarian Party and perennial candidate

=== American Independent Party ===
==== Eliminated in primary ====
- Forrest Jones, service business owner

=== No party preference ===
==== Eliminated in primary ====
- Laura Garza, (Note: Garza is a member of the Socialist Workers Party, but ran as No Party Preference because the Socialist Workers Party did not have ballot access in California.) railroad worker and perennial candidate
- Don Grundmann, (Note: Grundmann is a member of the Constitution Party, but ran as No Party Preference because the Constitution Party did not have ballot access in California) chair of the California Constitution Party and perennial candidate
- Mark Ruzon, (Note: Ruzon is a member of the American Solidarity Party, but ran as No Party Preference because the American Solidarity Party did not have ballot access in California.) California chair for the American Solidarity Party and write-in candidate for U.S. Senate in 2022
- Major Singh, software engineer, candidate for California's 14th congressional district in 2022, and candidate for governor in 2021

==== Write-in candidates ====
- Michael Dilger, social media marketing professional
- John Dowell

==== Declined ====
- Dwayne Johnson, actor and businessman
- Arnold Schwarzenegger, (Note: Schwarzenegger is a Republican, but media speculated that he might run as an independent candidate.) 38th governor of California (2003–2011)

== Primary elections ==
=== Campaign ===
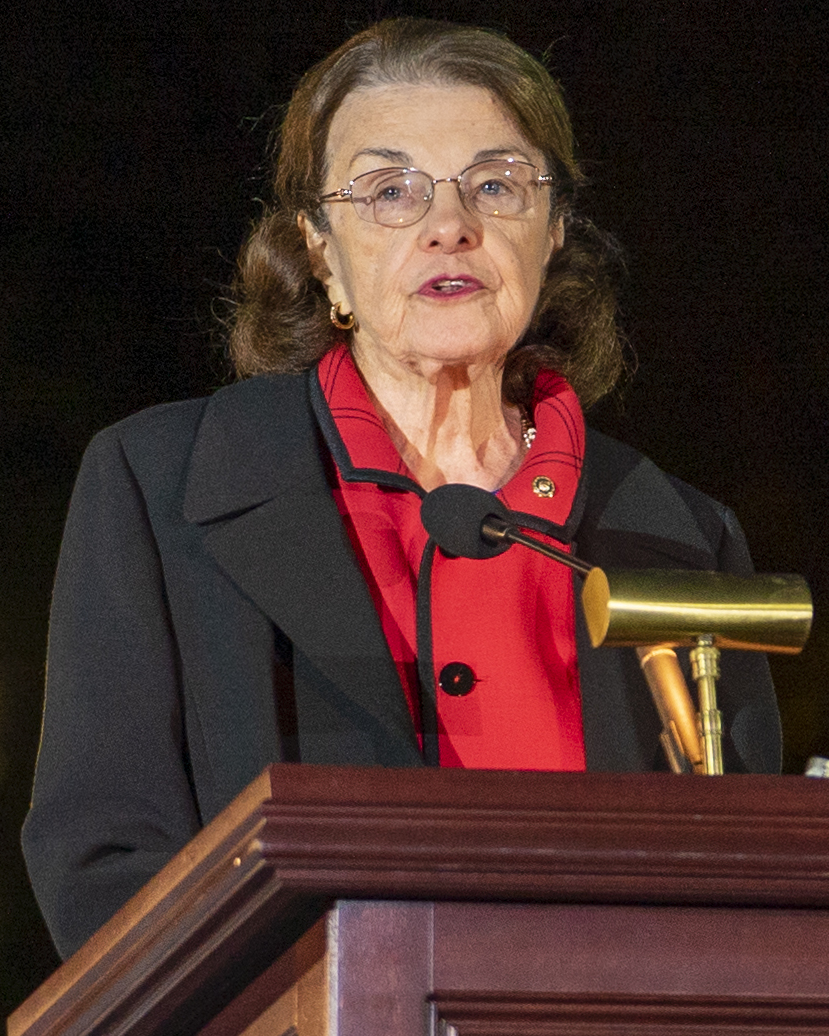
Dianne Feinstein in 2021

==== Schiff, Porter, and Lee declare ====
Media sources speculated for years that Dianne Feinstein might choose not to seek reelection in 2024 or resign before the end of her term, owing to her age, reports that her cognitive state was declining, and her decision not to take the position of Senate president pro tempore in the 118th Congress, third in line for the presidency, even though she would customarily have been offered the role as the most senior member of the majority caucus. There was also speculation that Feinstein might face opposition within the Democratic Party as she did in 2018, when she was challenged by fellow Democrat Kevin de León and defeated him by an unexpectedly narrow margin. In December 2022, Feinstein confirmed that she would not resign before the end of her term.

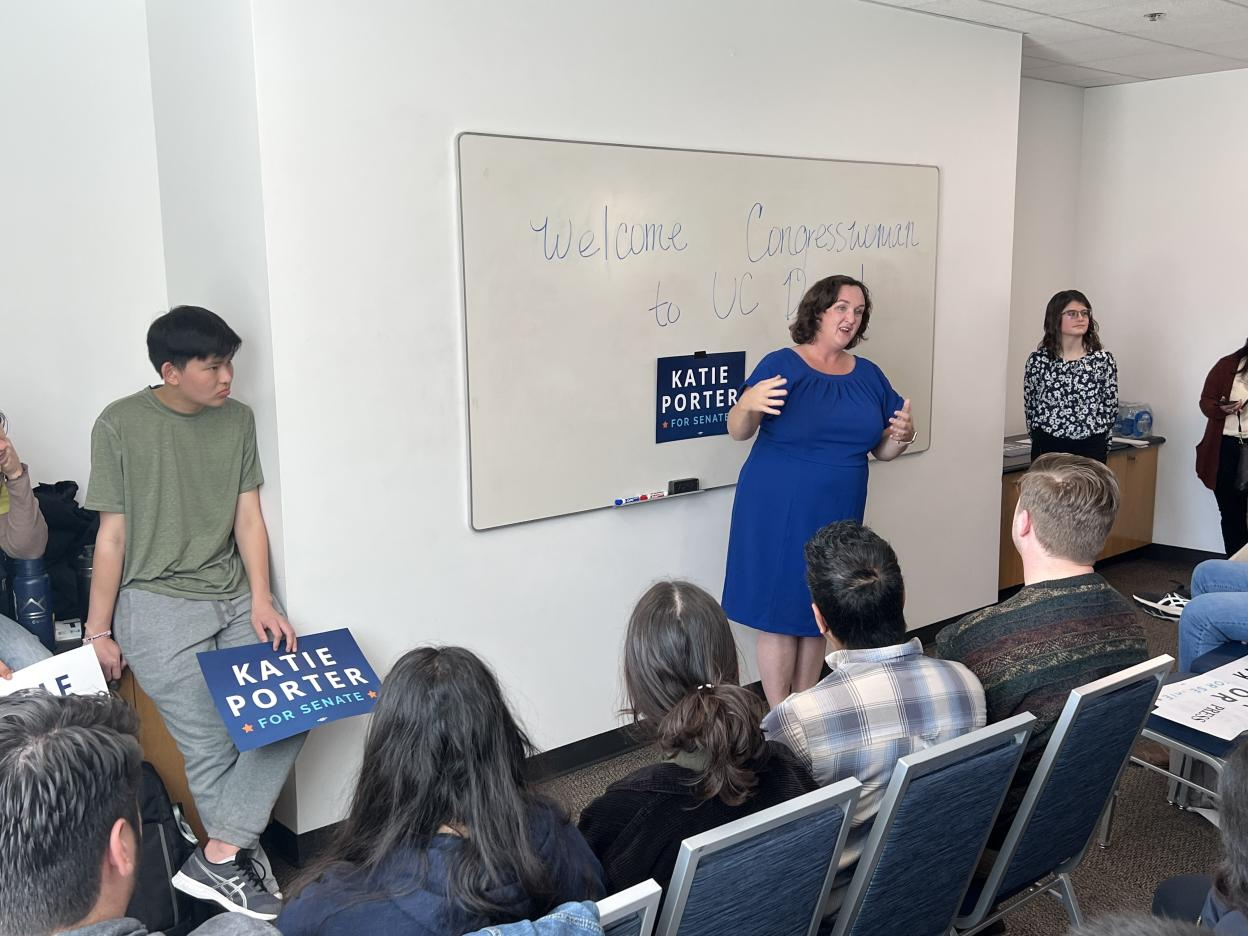
Katie Porter campaigning at University of California, Davis, in March 2023

In January 2023, with the question of Feinstein's reelection decision still open, U.S. Representative Katie Porter announced that she would run for the Senate. She confirmed that she would stay in the race even if Feinstein chose to run for another term. Porter was first elected in 2018, unseating incumbent Mimi Walters. She later gained national fame for her progressive politics, and frequently went viral online for her pointed questioning of corporate executives in congressional hearings, often while using a whiteboard. Porter's coastal, Orange County-based district is considered highly competitive, and all of her elections have been close.

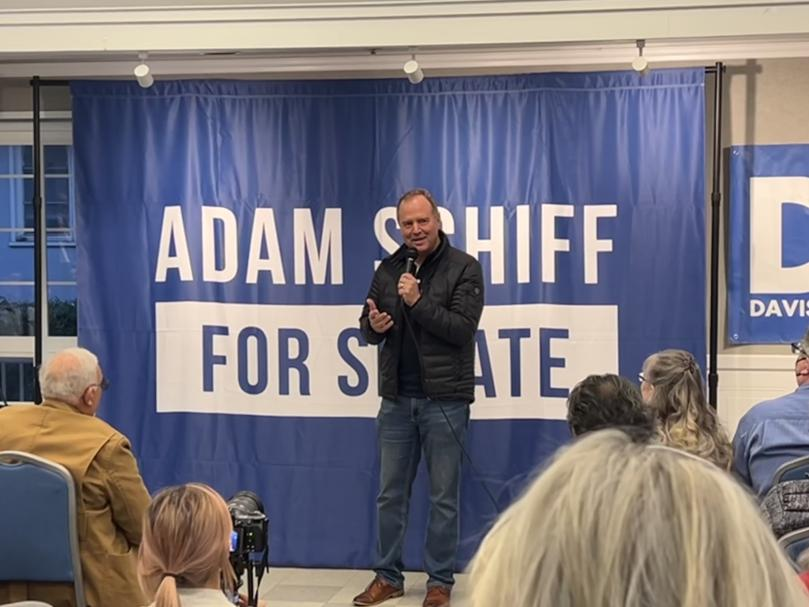
Adam Schiff at his first campaign event, February 2023

Two weeks later, Porter was joined by another Democratic member of the House, Adam Schiff, who said that he had consulted with Feinstein before entering the race. A moderate Democrat who unseated incumbent James Rogan in 2000, Schiff's profile rose significantly during the first term of president Donald Trump, owing to his role as a lead impeachment manager in Trump's first impeachment, his service on the January 6 Committee, and his frequent appearances on MSNBC. Schiff has not faced a competitive election since 2000, as his Los Angeles-based district became significantly more Democratic during the 2000 redistricting cycle and has been considered a safe seat ever since.

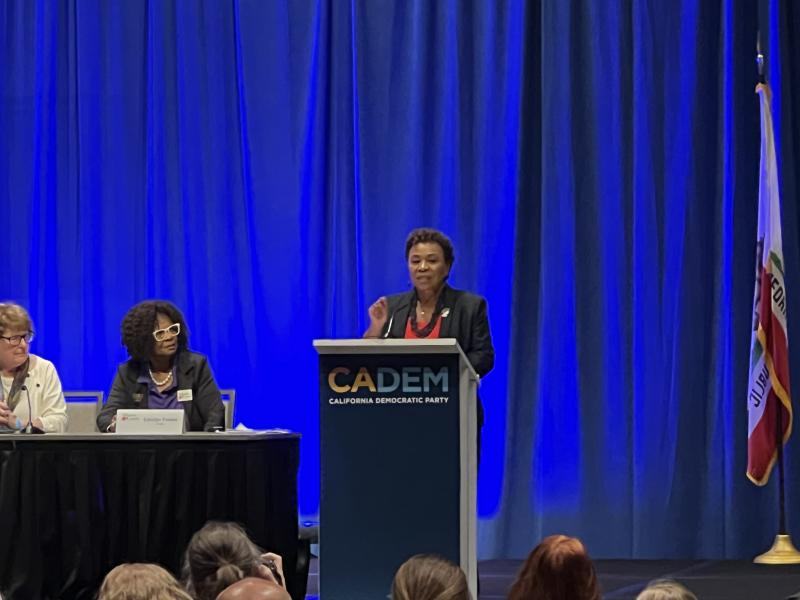
Barbara Lee speaking at the 2023 California Democratic Party Convention

A third Democratic House member, Barbara Lee, reportedly told members of the Congressional Black Caucus in January that she would also run for the Senate. As she was already 76 years old in January 2023, Lee reportedly pitched herself to donors as a transitional senator who would serve only one term. A longtime progressive first elected in a 1998 special election, Lee is known for being the only member of Congress to vote against the Authorization for Use of Military Force of 2001, which led to military deployment in Afghanistan and several other countries. Lee filed to run for Senate in early February 2023 and formally announced her campaign later that month. Lee's district, based in Alameda County and including one of the state's largest cities in Oakland, is one of the most Democratic-leaning districts in the entire country.

Feinstein continued to demur on her reelection plans, at one point saying she would not announce her decision until 2024. But in February 2023, she confirmed that she would retire, ending a political career that spanned over 50 years. The 2024 election is only the second California Senate race without an incumbent since 1992, the other being the 2016 election following Barbara Boxer's retirement. However, Politico pointed out that the 2016 election had an "early and prohibitive frontrunner" in Kamala Harris while the 2024 election has no clear frontrunner, and thus considered the 2024 election the first truly open California Senate race in 32 years.

==== Early months of the race ====
Lee, Porter, and Schiff have similar voting records in Congress and similarly progressive platforms. As a result, they were expected to differentiate themselves by their life stories and individual strengths rather than their ideologies. All three have faced controversies that could damage their campaigns: Porter has been accused of mistreating congressional staff, Lee's age was seen as a potential issue, and Schiff was expected to face opposition from progressives due to his past support for overseas military intervention and for taking donations from groups affiliated with the oil, payday loan, and pharmaceutical industries, though he took a no corporate PAC pledge in his Senate campaign. Schiff has also been criticized for listing his primary residence as Montgomery County, Maryland, in tax documents, though his campaign maintains that he lives in Burbank, California. Other important factors include geography, as Schiff and Porter both represent southern California while Lee represents northern California, and diversity; a victory by Schiff would leave California with no female senators for the first time since 1992, while a victory by Lee would make her only the fourth black woman to serve in the Senate.

Schiff began 2023 with $20.6 million in his campaign account compared to $7.7 million for Porter and just under $55,000 for Lee. All three quickly began raising large sums of money; for example, in the first 24 hours of her campaign, Porter raised over $1.3 million. The three also launched super PACs to aid with fundraising, each competing for the top California fundraising firms and consultants. Former Federal Election Commission chair Ann Ravel predicted that the race would be one of the most expensive Senate elections in history. The expensive nature of the race led media sources to speculate that a wealthy candidate could run a competitive self-funded campaign, akin to Rick Caruso's campaign in the 2022 Los Angeles mayoral election. This scenario seemed to come to pass when former Google executive Lexi Reese joined the race in June 2023; her aides told Politico she would spend a "significant" amount of her own money on her campaign. However, Reese made little impact on the race and dropped out months later; though she raised $2 million, much of it self-funded, she wrote that this was "just not enough to run a state-wide campaign."

Throughout most of 2023, there were no prominent Republicans in the race. This has been attributed to California's heavy Democratic lean and Republican donors' wariness of the high cost of running a statewide campaign in California; GOP strategist Duane Dichiara estimated that a Republican would need at least $80 million to run a viable Senate campaign. Additionally, California's top-two primary system could have allowed two Democrats to advance to the general election, a scenario that played out in the 2016 and 2018 Senate races, though the three-way division in the 2024 Democratic field could have helped a Republican reach the general election. Republicans would also benefit from the fact that the 2024 California Republican presidential primary, held on the same day as the Senate primary, was expected to be hotly contested and entice Republican voters to turn out in higher numbers.

==== Feinstein's death and replacement ====
Feinstein faced calls to resign throughout 2023 due to reports of her declining health, including from U.S. Representative Ro Khanna. She declined to do so. California governor Gavin Newsom had previously committed to appointing a black woman to the Senate if a seat opened up, after facing controversy due to appointing Alex Padilla to the seat left behind by Kamala Harris after she was elected vice president. Possible appointees speculated by media sources included Barbara Lee, Los Angeles mayor Karen Bass, San Francisco mayor London Breed, Los Angeles County supervisor Holly Mitchell, Secretary of State Shirley Weber, and talk show host Oprah Winfrey, though Bass, Mitchell, and Winfrey said they would not be interested. In September 2023, Newsom confirmed he would fulfill his promise to appoint a black woman, but said he would not appoint any candidate running to succeed Feinstein, and would instead appoint someone who committed not to run for a full term. Lee, the only black woman in the race, responded, "the idea that a Black woman should be appointed only as a caretaker to simply check a box is insulting to countless Black women across this country who have carried the Democratic Party to victory election after election." Lee faced backlash for her comments, with several advisors to Newsom leaving her super PAC. Newsom argued that the question of a Senate vacancy was "a hypothetical on top of a hypothetical," believing that Feinstein would not leave office before her term ended.

Feinstein died later that month, on September 29, 2023. Newsom was expected to quickly appoint a successor, as a crisis over a potential government shutdown necessitated a united Democratic front in the Senate. A special election for Feinstein's seat was held concurrently with the regular 2024 election. In addition to those already mentioned, possible successors speculated by media sources included PolicyLink founder Angela Glover Blackwell, former state assemblywoman Autumn Burke, EMILYs List director Laphonza Butler, State Controller Malia Cohen, California Supreme Court justice Leondra Kruger, Bay Area Rapid Transit Board of Directors president Lateefah Simon, and U.S. Representative Maxine Waters. Waters and California State Board of Education president Linda Darling-Hammond said they were not interested in the appointment. Congressional Black Caucus chair Steven Horsford sent a letter to Newsom on behalf of the caucus that urged him to appoint Lee.

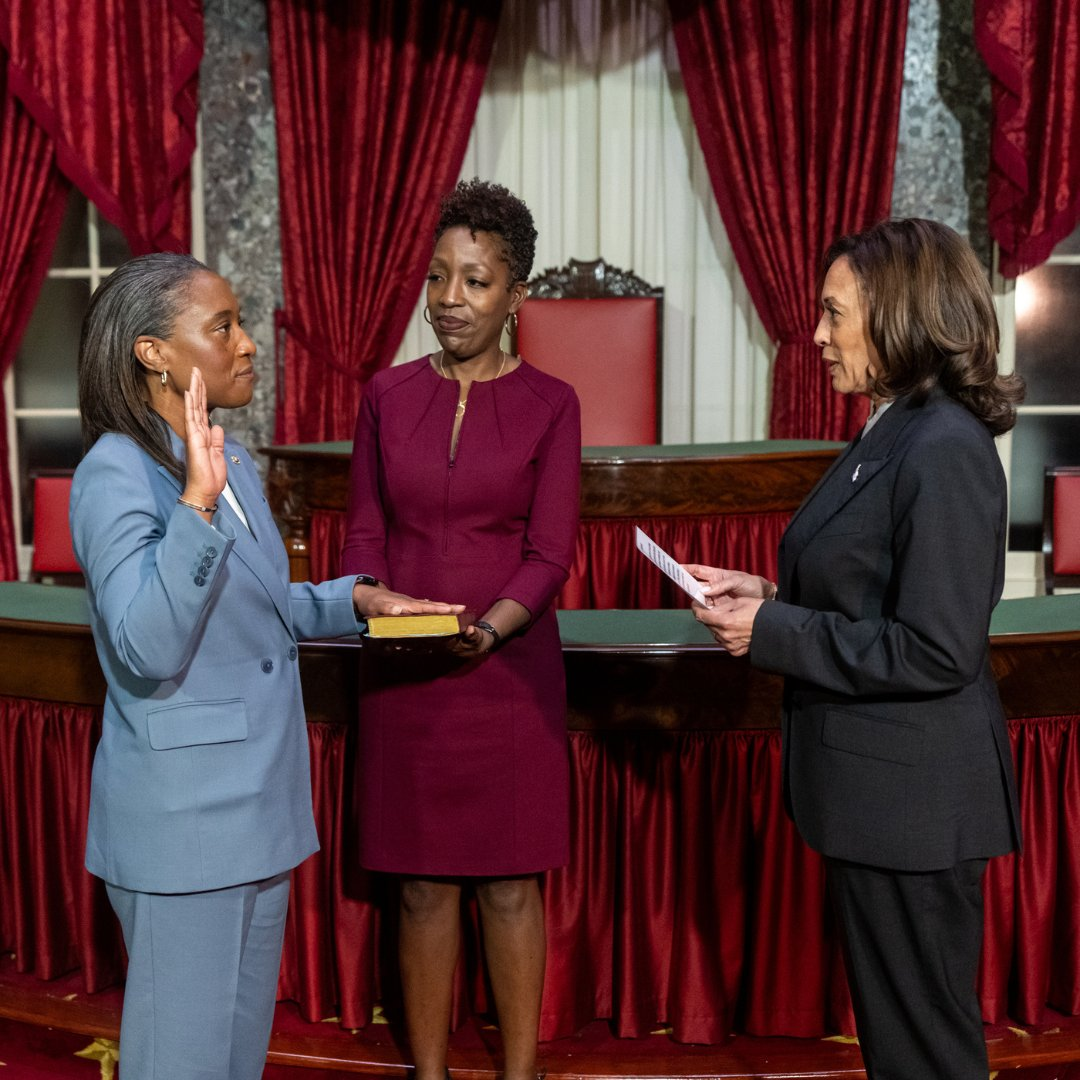
U.S. Vice President Kamala Harris (right) swears in Laphonza Butler (left).

On October 1, Newsom appointed Butler to the Senate, with no conditions about whether she might run in 2024. Butler formerly served as president of SEIU Local 2015, the largest union in California, and on the University of California Board of Regents. She is openly lesbian, making her California's first openly LGBTQ senator and the first openly LGBTQ African American to serve in Congress. Butler's appointment generated some controversy, with many pointing out that she was registered to vote in Maryland at the time. Butler responded that she had lived in California for many years before moving to the Washington metropolitan area in 2021, and that she still owned a home in Los Angeles. She promised to re-register to vote in the state. Butler was also criticized for advising Uber as it lobbied against a 2019 California bill to classify rideshare drivers as employees. In response, she maintained that she personally supported the bill. At first, Butler left open the question of whether she would run for a full term, but on October 19, she said she would not run in either of the 2024 Senate elections.

==== Later events in 2023 ====
On October 10, 2023, Republicans gained a prominent candidate when former professional baseball player Steve Garvey entered the race. Garvey, who played for both the Los Angeles Dodgers and the San Diego Padres, was considered to have an advantage in name recognition. Two other Republican candidates, healthcare executive James Bradley and attorney Eric Early, both of whom had previously made several unsuccessful bids for office, also attracted some media attention and support in polls. Schiff and Porter consistently led in polling throughout the race, with Lee and the Republicans far behind. Lee's poor polling numbers was attributed to a lack of name recognition outside her San Francisco Bay Area constituency, her lack of fundraising compared to Schiff and Porter, and the fact that Schiff and Porter had prior national fame while Lee was less well-known. In November 2023, Lee ruled out withdrawing from the race and insisted she still had a chance. Lee's campaign became much more willing to openly criticize her two main rivals, attempting to define Lee as the most progressive candidate in the race.

On November 18, 2023, the California Democratic Party held its endorsing convention for the Senate race. Lee received the most delegate votes, narrowly outpacing Schiff; however, neither candidate came close to reaching the 60% threshold necessary to win the endorsement. Rumors had circulated that Lee would drop out of the race and run for re-election to the House if she did not receive the party's endorsement, but her campaign reiterated after the convention that she intended on staying in the Senate race.

California Democratic Party Senate endorsement vote (60% required)
| Candidate | Regular election | | | Special election | | |
| Candidate | Votes | % | Result | Votes | % | Result |
|---|---|---|---|---|---|---|
| Barbara Lee | 963 | 41.47% | No endorsement | 958 | 41.26% | No endorsement |
| Adam Schiff | 933 | 40.18% | No endorsement | 927 | 39.92% | No endorsement |
| Katie Porter | 373 | 16.06% | No endorsement | 361 | 15.59% | No endorsement |
| Lexi Reese | 3 | 0.13% | No endorsement | 2 | 0.09% | No endorsement |
| Don't endorse | 50 | 2.15% | No endorsement | 67 | 2.89% | No endorsement |
| Total | 2,322 | 100.00% | No endorsement | 2,315 | 100.00% | No endorsement |

The Gaza war became a late issue in the race, with Lee initially being the only major candidate to call for a ceasefire. The California Democratic Party convention was disrupted by pro-Palestine protests calling for a ceasefire. Protestors entered the main convention arena and shouted, interrupting speeches by Schiff, Porter, and Lexi Reese. Some reportedly chanted the slogan "from the river to the sea, Palestine will be free." While the protest was initially peaceful, it later escalated, with over 1,000 protestors entering the building. Police locked down the building and the rest of the scheduled events that day were cancelled. Porter would later call for a ceasefire the following month.

==== Final months of the primary ====
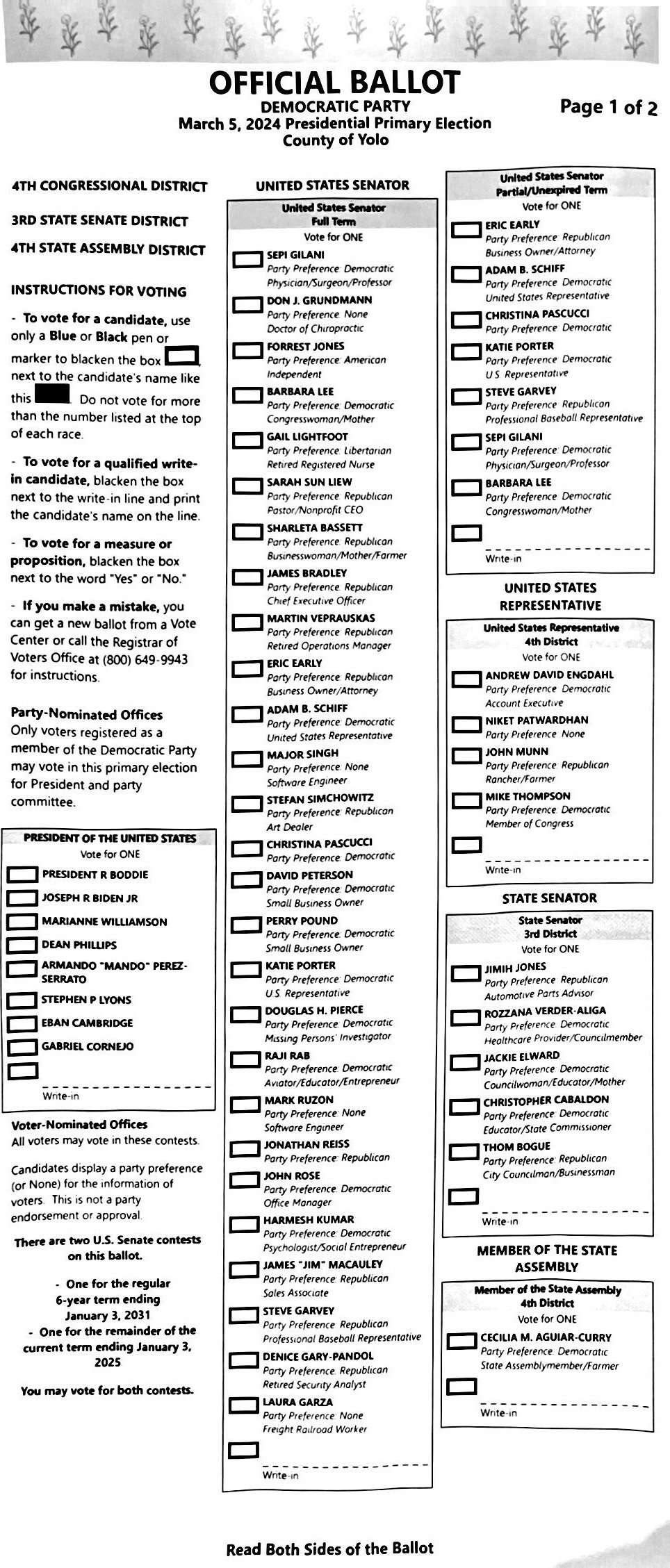
A 2024 primary ballot showing both U.S. Senate elections

In the months after his announcement, Garvey steadily rose in polling, heightening Republicans' odds of getting a candidate through to the general election. Garvey largely avoided taking positions on political issues, spent no money on television ads, and did little in-person campaigning. In the new year, Schiff's campaign began airing television ads that contrasted his positions with Garvey's. Porter accused Schiff of trying to prevent her from reaching the general election by boosting Garvey; she alleged that the ads, which labeled Garvey as too conservative, were intended to enamor Garvey to Republican voters. Due to the nonpartisan blanket primary, it is a common tactic for front-running candidates to boost the second place candidate whom they feel they can defeat most easily; Schiff's campaign denied that this was his intention. Supporters of Schiff also independently purchased a similar anti-Garvey ad which ran on Fox News, despite Schiff previously calling for a boycott of the network. Porter later began airing similar ads against another Republican, Eric Early. These ads were seen as an effort to split the Republican vote and help Porter clinch the second general election spot, though Porter denied this.

Politico, FOX 11 Los Angeles, and USC Dornsife held a debate on January 22, 2024, which included Schiff, Porter, Lee, and Garvey. The debate largely consisted of the Democrats criticizing Garvey for his past support of Trump and questioning Garvey's support of him in 2024, and the differing viewpoints of the four in the Gaza war. The stance of all candidates towards congressional earmarks, which Porter strongly opposes, also was a key topic.

Nexstar Media Group television stations aired a debate on February 12 featuring the same four candidates. Key highlights include the candidates being asked whether they would support certifying the election should a candidate of the other party win the presidency, rising crime, the minimum wage, corporate donations in political campaigns, and the federal role in housing.

KNBC and KVEA aired a debate in conjunction with Loyola Marymount University on February 20, which was broadcast on NBCUniversal-owned stations statewide and on KCRA, Sacramento's NBC affiliate. Topics included the minimum wage, the federal budget deficit, military spending, the Mexico–United States border crisis, climate change, extending the life of the Diablo Canyon Power Plant, and the proposed regulation of artificial intelligence.

=== Endorsements ===
James Bradley (R)

Political parties

- American Independent Party
Eric Early (R)

Organizations

- California ProLife Council
- California Republican Assembly
- California Rifle and Pistol Association

Political parties

- San Francisco Republican Party
Steve Garvey (R)

U.S. representatives

- Ken Calvert, CA-41 (1993–present)

Local officials

- Carl DeMaio, former San Diego city councilor (2008–2012)
- Dennis Zine, former Los Angeles city councilor from the 3rd district (2001–2013) (Independent)

Newspapers

- Santa Clarita Valley Signal

Labor unions

- San Diego Police Officers Association
Barbara Lee (D)

Statewide officials

- Rob Bonta, (Note: Co-endorsement with Porter) California attorney general (2021–present)
- Malia Cohen, California state controller] (2023–present)
- Keith Ellison, Minnesota attorney general (2019–present) and U.S. representative from MN-5 (2007–2019)
- Ricardo Lara, California insurance commissioner (2019–present)
- Fiona Ma, California state treasurer (2019–present)
- Tony Thurmond, California state superintendent of public instruction (2019–present)

U.S. representatives

- Jamaal Bowman, NY-16 (2021–2025)
- Troy Carter, LA-2 (2021–present)
- Emanuel Cleaver, MO-5 (2005–present)
- Jim Clyburn, SC-6 (1993–present)
- Bonnie Watson Coleman, NJ-12 (2015–present)
- Mark DeSaulnier, (Note: Co-endorsement with Schiff) CA-10 (2015–present)
- Steven Horsford, NV-4 (2013–2015, 2019–present)
- Pramila Jayapal, WA-7 (2017–present)
- Sydney Kamlager-Dove, CA-37 (2023–present)
- Ro Khanna, (Note: Her campaign co-chair) CA-17 (2017–present)
- Lucy McBath, GA-7 (2019–present)
- Gregory Meeks, NY-5 (1998–present)
- Ilhan Omar, MN-5 (2019–present)
- Ayanna Pressley, MA-7 (2019–present)
- Lisa Blunt Rochester, DE-AL (2017–2025)
- Terri Sewell, AL-7 (2011–present)
- Bennie Thompson, MS-2 (1993–present)
- Maxine Waters, CA-43 (1991–present)

State legislators

- 7 state senators
- 11 state assemblymembers

County officials

- Angela Alsobrooks, Prince George's County executive (2018–2024)
- Diana Becton, Contra Costa County district attorney (2017–present)
- Jane Kim, former San Francisco supervisor from the 6th district (2011–2019)
- Nora Vargas, San Diego County supervisor from the 1st district (2021–2025)
- Shamann Walton, San Francisco supervisor from the 10th district (2019–present)

Mayors in California

- Konstantine Anthony, Burbank (2022–present) (previously endorsed Schiff)
- Karen Bass, Los Angeles (2022–present), U.S. representative from CA-37 (2011–2022)
- London Breed, San Francisco (2018–2025)
- ~~Willie Brown, San Francisco (1996–2004)~~ (endorsed Butler's potential bid) (Note: Brown publicly stated he wished for Schiff, Porter, and Lee to withdraw and endorse Butler's potential bid; however, Butler declined to run for a full term.)
- Bill Paparian, (Note: No party preference) Pasadena (1995–1997)
- Libby Schaaf, Oakland (2015–2023)
- Sheng Thao, Oakland (2023–2024)
- Helen Tran, San Bernardino (2022–present)

Local officials

- 7/8 members of the Oakland City Council
- Jovanka Beckles, AC Transit board member (2020–present)
- Mike Bonin, Los Angeles city councilor from the 11th district (2013–2022)
- Bevan Dufty, BART board member (2002–2011)
- Eunisses Hernandez, Los Angeles city councilor from the 1st district (2022–present)
- Hugo Soto-Martinez, Los Angeles city councilor from the 13th district (2022–present)

Other state representatives

- Stacey Abrams, minority leader of the Georgia House (2011–2017)
- Justin Jones, Tennessee state representative from the 52nd district (2023–present)

Party officials

- 12 California Democratic Party caucus chairs

Individuals

- Aimee Allison, political data firm founder
- Dusty Baker, baseball player
- Marquita Bradshaw, Sierra Club Tennessee environmental justice chair
- Eve Ensler, playwright and actress
- Jamie Foxx, actor
- Danny Glover, actor
- Dolores Huerta, co-founder of United Farm Workers
- LaTanya Richardson Jackson, actress
- John Legend, singer-songwriter
- Dave Stewart, baseball player
- Sheryl Lee Ralph, actress and singer
- Gloria Steinem, feminist journalist
- Mini Timmaraju, lawyer

Political parties

- Culver City Democratic Party
- San Diego County Democratic Party (Note: Co-endorsement with Porter and Schiff)
- Working Families Party

Labor unions

- Alameda County Building Trades Council
- California Labor Federation
- National Association of Social Workers-PACE

Newspapers

- Bay Area Reporter
- Los Angeles Sentinel
- Merced Sun-Star
- The Sacramento Bee, The Fresno Bee, and The Modesto Bee
- San Francisco Bay Guardian
- San Francisco Bay View National Black Newspaper
- The San Luis Obispo Tribune

Organizations

- Alice B. Toklas LGBTQ Democratic Club
- Americans for Democratic Action Southern California
- Black Women Organized for Political Action PAC
- California Legislative Black Caucus
- Center for Asian American Media
- Congressional Black Caucus PAC
- Courage California
- East Bay Stonewall Democratic Club
- East Bay Young Democrats
- Feminist Majority PAC
- Friends of the Earth Action
- Gen-Z for Change
- Harvey Milk LGBTQ Democratic Club
- J Street PAC
- National Women's Political Caucus
- Our Revolution
- Peace Action
- San Diego County Young Democrats
- Ventura County Young Democrats
- Wellstone Progressive Democrats of Sacramento (Note: Affiliate of Our Revolution)
Gail Lightfoot (L)

Political parties

- California Libertarian Party
Katie Porter (D)

Statewide officials

- Rob Bonta, (Note: Co-endorsement with Lee) California attorney general (2021–present)

U.S. senators

- Elizabeth Warren, U.S. senator from Massachusetts (2013–present)

U.S. representatives

- Robert Garcia, CA-42 (2023–present)

State senators

- Josh Newman, SD-29 (2016–2018, 2020–2024)
- Scott Wiener, SD-11 (2016–present)

State assemblymembers

- Alex Lee, AD-24 (2020–present)
- Cottie Petrie-Norris, AD-73 (2018–present)
- Buffy Wicks, AD-15 (2018–present)

Local officials

- Cori Schumacher, former Carlsbad city councilor (2016–2021)

Individuals

- Krystal Ball, media host
- Elizabeth Banks, actress and filmmaker
- Sara Nelson, AFA-CWA international president (2014–present)
- Sal Rosselli, founder of National Union of Healthcare Workers
- Adam Scott, actor and comedian

Political parties

- Democrats of Greater Irvine
- San Diego County Democratic Party (Note: Co-endorsement with Lee and Schiff)

Labor unions

- American Federation of Teachers Local 6106 (Note: North Orange County Community College District Adjunct Facility United)
- Association of Flight Attendants and AFA-CWA Council 11
- California Labor Federation
- California School Employees Association
- Communications Workers of America District 9
- 3 International Brotherhood of Electrical Workers locals
- National Union of Healthcare Workers
- Orange County Employees Association
- United Auto Workers International, Region 6 Western States, and Local 5810

Newspapers

- San Francisco Chronicle

Organizations

- Consumer Federation of California
- J Street PAC
- National Women's Political Caucus
- Progressive Change Campaign Committee PAC
- Vote Common Good
- Vote Mama
Mark Ruzon (ASP)

Political parties

- American Solidarity Party of California
Adam Schiff (D)

Federal officials

- Louis Caldera, former U.S. secretary of the Army (1998–2001)

U.S. senators

- Barbara Boxer, former U.S. senator from California (1993–2017)

U.S. representatives

- Pete Aguilar, CA-33 (2015–present)
- Ami Bera, CA-6 (2013–present)
- Howard Berman, CA-28 (1983–2013)
- Julia Brownley, CA-26 (2013–present)
- Salud Carbajal, CA-24 (2017–present)
- Judy Chu, CA-28 (2009–present)
- Lou Correa, CA-46 (2017–present)
- Jim Costa, CA-21 (2005–present)
- Susan Davis, CA-53 (2001–2021)
- Mark DeSaulnier, CA-10 (2015–present)
- Anna Eshoo, CA-16 (1993–2025)
- Sam Farr, CA-20 (1993–2017)
- Jimmy Gomez, CA-34 (2017–present)
- Jane Harman, CA-36 (1993–1999, 2001–2011)
- Jared Huffman, CA-02 (2013–present)
- Sydney Kamlager-Dove, CA-37 (2023–present)
- Mike Levin, CA-49 (2019–present)
- Mel Levine, CA-27 (1983–1993)
- Ted Lieu, CA-36 (2015–present)
- Alan Lowenthal, CA-47 (2013–2023)
- Doris Matsui, CA-07 (2005–present)
- Jerry McNerney, CA-09 (2007–2023)
- George Miller, CA-11 (1975–2015)
- Kevin Mullin, CA-15 (2023–present)
- Grace Napolitano, CA-31 (1999–2025)
- Jimmy Panetta, CA-19 (2017–present)
- Nancy Pelosi, CA-11 (1987–present), speaker of the House (2007–2011, 2019–2023)
- Scott Peters, CA-50 (2013–present)
- Raul Ruiz, CA-25 (2013–present)
- Linda Sánchez, CA-38 (2003–present)
- Brad Sherman, CA-32 (1997–present)
- Eric Swalwell, CA-14 (2013–present)
- Mark Takano, CA-39 (2013–present)
- Mike Thompson, CA-04 (1999–present)
- Juan Vargas, CA-52 (2013–present)
- Henry Waxman, CA-33 (1975–2015)

State legislators

- 13 state senators
- 17 state assemblymembers

County officials

- Doug Chaffee, Orange County supervisor from the 4th district (2019–present)
- Matt Dorsey, San Francisco supervisor (2022–present)
- Janice Hahn, Los Angeles County supervisor (2016–present), U.S. representative from CA-44 (2011–2016)
- Dennis Herrera, SFPUC general manager (2021–present)
- Terra Lawson-Remer, San Diego County supervisor (2021–present)
- Aaron Peskin, San Francisco supervisor (2001–2009, 2015–2025)

Mayors in California

- Ashleigh Aitken, Anaheim (2022–present)
- ~~Konstantine Anthony, Burbank (2022–2023)~~ (switched endorsement to Lee)
- Todd Gloria, San Diego (2020–present)
- Darrell Steinberg, Sacramento (2016–2024)

Local officials

- John Pérez, University of California regent (2014–present) and former assemblymember from AD-53 (2008–2014)
- Katy Yaroslavsky, Los Angeles city councilor from the 5th district (2022–present)

Individuals

- Jamie Lee Curtis, actress and producer
- Robert De Niro, actor
- Lindsay Dougherty, labor leader
- Joseph Gordon-Levitt, actor
- Mark Hamill, actor and writer
- Edward Kelly, IAFF general president (2021–present)
- Matthew Loeb, IATSE international president (2008–present)
- Douglas McCarron, United Brotherhood of Carpenters president (1995–present)

Political parties

- San Diego County Democratic Party (Note: Co-endorsement with Lee and Porter)

Labor unions

- Actors' Equity Association
- Amalgamated Transit Union (Note: International and California Conference Boards)
- American Federation of Musicians Local 47
- California Labor Federation
- International Alliance of Theatrical Stage Employees California (Note: California State Council, District 2, and Local 80)
- International Association of Fire Fighters (Note: And California Professional Firefighters)
- International Brotherhood of Electrical Workers California (Note: California State Association and 13 locals)
- International Brotherhood of Teamsters California (Note: California, Joint Councils 7 and 42, and Locals 399 and 856)
- International Union of Operating Engineers California (Note: California-Nevada State Council and Locals 3, 12, and 501)
- United Brotherhood of Carpenters (Note: National, Southwest Mountain States Regional Council, and Northern California Regional Council)
- United Farm Workers

Newspapers

- Los Angeles Times

Organizations

- Armenian National Committee of America-Western Region
- Coalition for Humane Immigrant Rights of Los Angeles Action Fund
- Democratic Majority for Israel
- J Street PAC
- Westside Young Democrats
Laphonza Butler (D) (declined to run)

Local officials

- Willie Brown, former mayor of San Francisco (1996–2004) and speaker of the California State Assembly (1980–1995) (previously endorsed Lee)
Declined to endorse

U.S. senators

- Laphonza Butler, U.S. senator from California (2023–2024)

U.S. representatives

- Zoe Lofgren, CA-18 (1995–present)

Political parties

- California Democratic Party

Labor unions

- Service Employees International Union California and United Healthcare Workers West

Organizations

- Stonewall Democrats

=== Polling ===
| Poll source | Date(s) administered | Sample size (Note: Key: A – all adults RV – registered voters LV – likely voters V – unclear) | Margin of error | James Bradley (R) | Eric Early (R) | Steve Garvey (R) | Barbara Lee (D) | Katie Porter (D) | Adam Schiff (D) | Other | Undecided |
|---|---|---|---|---|---|---|---|---|---|---|---|
| Emerson College (Note: Poll sponsored by The Hill) | February 24–27, 2024 | 1,000 (LV) | ± 3.0% | 2% | 2% | 20% | 8% | 17% | 28% | 6% (Note: Christina Pascucci (D) and Sarah Sun Liew (R) with 2%, Jonathan Reiss (R) and "someone else" with 1%) | 17% |
| UC Berkeley IGS (Note: Poll sponsored by the Los Angeles Times) | February 22–26, 2024 | 3,304 (LV) | ± 2.0% | 2% | 2% | 27% | 8% | 19% | 25% | 8% | 9% |
| WPA Intelligence (R) (Note: Poll sponsored by Garvey's campaign) | February 19–21, 2024 | 800 (LV) | ± 3.5% | – | 4% | 24% | 10% | 15% | 27% | 3% (Note: "Other candidates" with 3%) | 17% |
| Emerson College | February 16–18, 2024 | 935 (LV) | ± 3.1% | 2% | 2% | 22% | 9% | 16% | 28% | 2% (Note: Christina Pascucci (D) with 2%) | 17% |
| Public Policy Institute of California | February 6–13, 2024 | 1,066 (LV) | ± 3.9% | 3% | 4% | 18% | 10% | 19% | 24% | 14% (Note: Sarah Sun Liew (R) with 2%; Denice Gary-Pandol (R), Jonathan Reiss (R), Christina Pasucci (D), David Peterson (D), Douglas H. Pierce (D), Sharleta Bassett (R), James Macauley (R), Forrest Jones (AI), Gail Lightfoot (L), Laura Garza (NPP), Don J. Grundmann (C), "someone else" with 1%; Raji Rab (D), John David Rose (D), Major Singh (NPP), Perry Pound (D), Mark Ruzon (ASP), Sepi Gilani (D), Harmesh Kumar (D), Stefan Simchowitz (R), Martin Veprauskas (R), "would not vote for U.S. Senator" with 0%) | 6% |
| USC Dornsife/CSU Long Beach/ Cal Poly Pomona | January 21–29, 2024 | 1,416 (LV) | ± 2.6% | 1% | 1% | 15% | 7% | 15% | 26% | 2% (Note: Jessica Resendez (D) with 1%; "All other individual candidates with 1%) | 29% |
| Emerson College | January 11–14, 2024 | 1,087 (LV) | ± 2.9% | 2% | 3% | 18% | 8% | 13% | 25% | 5% (Note: Christina Pascucci (D) with 2%; Jonathan Reiss (R) with 1%; Sarah Sun Liew (R) with 1%; Someone else with 1%) | 24% |
| UC Berkeley IGS | January 4–8, 2024 | 4,470 (LV) | ± 2.0% | 3% | 3% | 13% | 9% | 17% | 21% | 13% (Note: Sharleta Bassett (R) with 3%; Jonathan Reiss (R) with 2%; "All others (each with 1% or more)" with 8%) | 21% |
| Morning Consult (Note: Poll sponsored by Politico) | December 15–19, 2023 | 858 (LV) | ± 3.0% | 5% | 4% | 15% | 12% | 14% | 26% | 4% (Note: Christina Pascucci (D) with 3%; Denise Gary-Pandol (R) with 1%) | 19% |
| SurveyUSA | December 7–10, 2023 | 590 (LV) | ± 5.0% | 5% | 6% | 15% | 12% | 12% | 22% | 8% (Note: Christina Pascucci (D) with 5%; Jonathan Reiss (R), Lexi Reese (D) & "Other" with 1%) | 20% |
| Public Policy Institute of California | November 9–16, 2023 | 1,113 (LV) | ± 3.2% | – | – | 10% | 8% | 16% | 21% | 27% | 14% |
| Emerson College (Note: Poll sponsored by Nexstar Media) | November 11–14, 2023 | 1,000 (RV) | ± 3.0% | 3% | 2% | 10% | 9% | 13% | 16% | 8% (Note: Christina Pascucci (D), Lexi Reese (D) & "Someone else" with 2%; Sarah Sun Liew (R) & Jonathan Reiss (R) with 1%) | 39% |
| UC Berkeley IGS | October 24–30, 2023 | 4,506 (LV) | ± 2.5% | 7% | 4% | 10% | 9% | 17% | 16% | 7% (Note: "Others" with 5%; Lexie Reese (D) & Christina Pascucci (D) with 1%) | 30% |
| Public Policy Institute of California | October 3–19, 2023 | 1,395 (LV) | ± 4.0% | 5% | 6% | – | 9% | 18% | 21% | 32% (Note: "Someone else" with 12%; Barack Mandela (R), Sarah Sun Liew (R), Jonathan Reiss (R) & Jessica Resendez (D) with 2%; Paul Anderson (G), Dana Bobbit (I), Joshua Bocanegra (D), Danny Fabricant (R), Jeremy Fennell (D), Frank Ferreira (I), Roxanne Lawler (R), John Poppenheim (R), Raji Rab (D), Lexi Reese (D), Katie Roederscheimer (I) & John Rose (D) with 1%; Akinyemi Agbede (D), Fepbrina Autiameineire (O), Jacob Farmos (D), Carson Franklin (D), Dian Foxington (D), Denice Gary-Pandol (R), Jehu Hand (R), Denard Ingram (D), Zakaira Kortam (R) & "Would not vote" with 0%) | 8% |
| Data Viewpoint | October 1, 2023 | 533 (RV) | ± 4.3% | 6% | 4% | – | 6% | 19% | 19% | 13.5% (Note: Sarah Sun Liew (R) with 3%; Several other candidates with <2%) | 32% |
| Public Policy Institute of California | August 25 – September 5, 2023 | 1,146 (LV) | ± 3.7% | 5% | 5% | – | 8% | 15% | 20% | 31% (Note: Barack Mandela, Jonathan Reiss, Jessica Resendez and "Someone else" with 3%; Roxanne Lawler, John Pappenheim, Katie Roedersheimer, and Sarah Sun Liew with 2%; Akinyemi Agbede, Paul Anderson, Dana Bobbit, Joshua Bocanegra, Danny Fabricant, Jacob Farmos, Frank Ferreria, Denise Gary-Pandol, Zakaira Kortam, Lexi Reese, John Rose, and "Would not vote" with 1%; Fepbrina Autiameineire, Jeremy Fennell, Dian Foxington, Carson Franklin, Jehu Hand, Denard Ingram, and Raji Rab with 0%) | 16% |
| UC Berkeley IGS | August 24–29, 2023 | 4,579 (LV) | ± 2.5% | 7% | 5% | 7% | 7% | 17% | 20% | 12% (Note: Lexie Reese (D) with 1%; "Others" with 4%) | 32% |
| Public Policy Institute of California | June 7–29, 2023 | 1,092 (LV) | ± 3.8% | 6% | 7% | – | 13% | 19% | 16% | 33% (Note: Sarah Sun Liew with 5%; Jonathan Reiss with 4%; Frank Ferreria and "Someone else" with 3%; Joshua Bocanegra, Danny Fabricant, Roxanne Lawler, Raji Rab, and Jessica Resendez with 2%; Akinyemi Agbede, Jacob Farmos, Jeremy Fennell, Denise Gary-Pandol, Denard Ingram, and Jehu Hand with 1%) | 6% |
| Emerson College | June 4–7, 2023 | 1,056 (RV) | ± 2.9% | 6% | 3% | – | 6% | 14% | 15% | 9% (Note: Jessica Resendez with 3%; Douglas Howard Pierce with 2%; Frank Ferreria, Denise Gary-Pandol, Roxanne Lawler, Raji Rab, Jonathan Reiss, and "Someone else" with 1%) | 47% |
| UC Berkeley IGS | May 17–22, 2023 | 5,236 (LV) | ± 2.5% | – | 18% | – | 9% | 17% | 14% | 10% | 32% |
| FM3 Research (D) (Note: Poll sponsored by Lee's campaign) | May 13–21, 2023 | 1,380 (LV) | ± 4.0% | – | 27% | – | 11% | 24% | 21% | 17% | |
| UC Berkeley IGS | February 14–20, 2023 | 7,512 (RV) | ± 2.5% | – | – | – | 8% | 20% | 23% | 10% | 39% |

Hypothetical polling

Ro Khanna vs. Barbara Lee vs. Katie Porter vs. Adam Schiff

| Poll source | Date(s) administered | Sample size | Margin of error | Ro Khanna (D) | Barbara Lee (D) | Katie Porter (D) | Adam Schiff (D) | Other | Undecided |
|---|---|---|---|---|---|---|---|---|---|
| UC Berkeley IGS | February 14–20, 2023 | 7,512 (RV) | ± 2.5% | 4% | 6% | 20% | 22% | 9% | 39% |
| David Binder Research | November 19–21, 2022 | 600 (LV) | ± 4.0% | 6% | 9% | 30% | 29% | 9% (Note: "Generic Republican" with 9%) | 17% |

With vs. without Steve Garvey

| Poll source | Date(s) administered | Sample size | Margin of error | James Bradley (R) | Eric Early (R) | Steve Garvey (R) | Barbara Lee (D) | Katie Porter (D) | Lexie Reese (D) | Adam Schiff (D) | Other | Undecided |
|---|---|---|---|---|---|---|---|---|---|---|---|---|
| UC Berkeley IGS | Aug 24–29, 2023 | 3,113 (LV) | ± 2.5% | 7% | 5% | 7% | 7% | 17% | 1% | 20% | 4% | 32% |
| UC Berkeley IGS | Aug 24–29, 2023 | 3,113 (LV) | ± 2.5% | 10% | 7% | – | 7% | 17% | 1% | 20% | 4% | 34% |

=== Fundraising ===
Campaign finance reports as of March 31, 2024 (Note: Due to the large number of candidates in the race, only those with more than $25,000 raised are included in this table)
| Candidate | Raised | Spent | Cash on hand |
|---|---|---|---|
| James Bradley (R) | $182,626 | $152,659 | $30,052 |
| Eric Early (R) | $898,233 (Note: $204,200 of this total was self-funded by Early) | $893,719 | $4,514 |
| Steve Garvey (R) | $5,528,359 | $3,921,776 | $1,606,583 |
| Denice Gary-Pandol (R) | $129,324 | $128,482 | $842 |
| Sarah Sun Liew (R) | $48,420 | $24,977 | $6,240 |
| Barbara Lee (D) | $5,423,501 | $5,093,171 | $330,330 |
| Christina Pascucci (D) | $456,534 | $456,534 | $0 |
| Katie Porter (D) | $31,536,915 | $30,960,241 | $576,674 |
| Perry Pound (D) | $34,129 | $29,350 | $4,778 |
| Lexi Reese (D) (Note: Withdrawn candidate) | $2,016,597 | $1,810,020 | $206,577 |
| Adam Schiff (D) | $35,146,126 | $51,348,262 | $4,820,824 |
Source: Federal Election Commission

=== Debates ===
2024 United States Senate election in California primary debates
| No. | Date | Host | Moderator | Link | Republican | Democratic | Democratic | Democratic |
| Key: P Participant A Absent N Not invited I Invited W Withdrawn | | | | | | | | |
| Key: P Participant A Absent N Not invited I Invited W Withdrawn | | | | | Steve Garvey | Barbara Lee | Katie Porter | Adam Schiff |
|---|---|---|---|---|---|---|---|---|
| 1 | Jan 22, 2024 | California Environmental Voters; Education Fund, KFI, KTTV, Politico, USC Dornsife Center | Melanie Mason; Elex Michaelson | YouTube | P | P | P | P |
| 2 | Feb 12, 2024 | Nexstar Media Group stations: KTLA, KSWB-TV, KRON-TV, KTXL, KSEE, KGET-TV | Frank Buckley; Nikki Laurenzo | YouTube | P | P | P | P |
| 3 | Feb 20, 2024 | Loyola Marymount University; KNBC / KVEA | Colleen Williams; Conan Nolan; Alejandra Ortiz | YouTube | P | P | P | P |

=== Results ===
County results Schiff: 30–40%; 40–50%; 50–60%; Garvey: 30–40%; 40–50%; 50–60%; 60–70%

Congressional district results Schiff: 30–40%; 40–50%; Garvey: 30–40%; 40–50%; 50–60%; Lee: 30–40%

Schiff and Garvey advanced in both regular and special primaries, albeit with different results. Schiff narrowly secured the first place in the regular primary with just 0.05% of the vote over Garvey, but fell short of it in the special one by 4%. However, the three leading Democrats overall performed better in the special primary, with 58.2% of the vote compared to 56.7%.

Candidates' vote share by county Schiff (top-left), Garvey (top-right) Porter (bottom-left), Lee (bottom-right)

Regular blanket primary results
| Party | Candidate | Votes | % |
|---|---|---|---|
| Democratic | Adam Schiff | 2,304,829 | 31.57% |
| Republican | Steve Garvey | 2,301,351 | 31.52% |
| Democratic | Katie Porter | 1,118,429 | 15.32% |
| Democratic | Barbara Lee | 717,129 | 9.82% |
| Republican | Eric Early | 242,055 | 3.32% |
| Republican | James Bradley | 98,778 | 1.35% |
| Democratic | Christina Pascucci | 61,998 | 0.85% |
| Republican | Sharleta Bassett | 54,884 | 0.75% |
| Republican | Sarah Sun Liew | 38,718 | 0.53% |
| No party preference | Laura Garza | 34,529 | 0.47% |
| Republican | Jonathan Reiss | 34,400 | 0.47% |
| Democratic | Sepi Gilani | 34,316 | 0.47% |
| Libertarian | Gail Lightfoot | 33,295 | 0.46% |
| Republican | Denice Gary-Pandol | 25,649 | 0.35% |
| Republican | James Macauley | 23,296 | 0.32% |
| Democratic | Harmesh Kumar | 21,624 | 0.30% |
| Democratic | David Peterson | 21,170 | 0.29% |
| Democratic | Douglas Pierce | 19,458 | 0.27% |
| No party preference | Major Singh | 17,092 | 0.23% |
| Democratic | John Rose | 14,627 | 0.20% |
| Democratic | Perry Pound | 14,195 | 0.19% |
| Democratic | Raji Rab | 13,640 | 0.19% |
| No party preference | Mark Ruzon | 13,488 | 0.18% |
| American Independent | Forrest Jones | 13,140 | 0.18% |
| Republican | Stefan Simchowitz | 12,773 | 0.17% |
| Republican | Martin Veprauskas | 9,795 | 0.13% |
| No party preference | Don Grundmann | 6,641 | 0.09% |
| No party preference | Michael Dilger (write-in) | 7 | 0.00% |
| Republican | Carlos Guillermo Tapia (write-in) | 5 | 0.00% |
| No party preference | John Dowell (write-in) | 3 | 0.00% |
| Republican | Danny Fabricant (write-in) | 3 | 0.00% |
| Total votes | | 7,301,317 | 100.0% |

County results Schiff: 20–30%; 30–40%; 40–50%; Garvey: 30–40%; 40–50%; 50–60%; 60–70%

Congressional district results Schiff: 30–40%; 40–50%; Garvey: 20–30%; 30–40%; 40–50%; 50–60%; Lee: 30–40%

Special blanket primary results
| Party | Candidate | Votes | % |
|---|---|---|---|
| Republican | Steve Garvey | 2,455,115 | 33.25% |
| Democratic | Adam Schiff | 2,160,171 | 29.25% |
| Democratic | Katie Porter | 1,272,684 | 17.24% |
| Democratic | Barbara Lee | 866,551 | 11.74% |
| Republican | Eric Early | 451,274 | 6.11% |
| Democratic | Christina Pascucci | 109,867 | 1.49% |
| Democratic | Sepi Gilani | 68,497 | 0.93% |
| No party preference | Michael Dilger (write-in) | 27 | 0.00% |
| Total votes | | 7,384,186 | 100.0% |

==== Maps ====
Other election maps
Top three Democrats' results by county in the regular primary

Top three Democrats' results by county in the special primary

Best Democrat's performance by county in the regular primary (blue for Schiff, green for Porter)

Best Democrat's performance by county in the special primary (blue for Schiff, green for Porter)

Early's results by county in the regular primary

Early's results by county in the special primary

=== Aftermath ===
After her loss, Porter remarked that the election was "rigged by billionaires," referring to a $10 million independent ad campaign attacking her that was funded by cryptocurrency supporters. Porter's use of the word "rigged" was criticized, with some comparing her statement to Donald Trump's false claims of fraud in the 2020 election. Porter expressed regret for use of the word "rigged" and said that she meant to say that the election was "manipulated by dishonest means", which was a reference to the use of dark money in campaign financing, and not to mean that there was anything illegitimate about the vote counting.

== General elections ==
=== Predictions ===
| Source | Ranking | As of |
|---|---|---|
| The Cook Political Report | Solid D | November 9, 2023 |
| Inside Elections | Solid D | November 9, 2023 |
| Sabato's Crystal Ball | Safe D | November 9, 2023 |
| Decision Desk HQ/The Hill | Safe D | June 8, 2024 |
| Elections Daily | Safe D | May 4, 2023 |
| CNalysis | Solid D | November 21, 2023 |
| Split Ticket | Solid D | October 23, 2024 |
| 538 | Solid D | October 23, 2024 |

=== Post-primary endorsements ===
Adam Schiff (D)

U.S. senators

- Alex Padilla, U.S. senator from California (2021–present)

U.S. representatives

- Barbara Lee, CA-12 (1998–2025)
- Katie Porter, CA-47 (2019–2025)

Individuals

- Harry Dunn, former U.S. Capitol Police officer

Labor unions

- Association of Flight Attendants

Newspapers

- The Sacramento Bee

Organizations

- End Citizens United
- ~~Harvey Milk LGBTQ Democratic Club~~ (rescinded after endorsement vote found fraudulent)
- Jewish Democratic Council of America
- Planned Parenthood Action Fund
- Reproductive Freedom for All
Steve Garvey (R)

Political parties

- California Republican Party

Daily newspapers

- The Santa Clarita Valley Signal

=== Fundraising ===
Campaign finance reports as of November 25, 2024
| Candidate | Raised | Spent | Cash on hand |
|---|---|---|---|
| Adam Schiff (D) | $47,822,048 | $62,355,290 | $6,489,718 |
| Steve Garvey (R) | $20,345,393 | $19,685,766 | $659,627 |
Source: Federal Election Commission

=== Polling ===
Aggregate polls

| Source of poll aggregation | Dates administered | Dates updated | Adam Schiff (D) | Steve Garvey (R) | Undecided (Note: Calculated by taking the difference of 100% and all other candidates combined.) | Margin |
|---|---|---|---|---|---|---|
| FiveThirtyEight | through November 3, 2024 | November 4, 2024 | 58.6% | 35.4% | 6.0% | Schiff +23.2% |
| 270toWin | September 30 – November 4, 2024 | November 4, 2024 | 56.4% | 34.6% | 9.0% | Schiff +21.8% |
| RealClearPolitics | August 29 – October 14, 2024 | October 21, 2024 | 57.3% | 34.7% | 8.0% | Schiff +22.6% |
| TheHill/DDHQ | through November 3, 2024 | November 4, 2024 | 58.4% | 36.3% | 5.3% | Schiff +22.1% |
| Average | | | 57.7% | 35.3% | 7.1% | Schiff +22.4% |

| Poll source | Date(s) administered | Sample size | Margin of error | Adam Schiff (D) | Steve Garvey (R) | Other | Undecided |
|---|---|---|---|---|---|---|---|
| Research Co. | November 2–3, 2024 | 450 (LV) | ± 4.6% | 60% | 37% | – | 4% |
| Competitive Edge Research | October 28–30, 2024 | 517 (RV) | ± 4.3% | 52% | 42% | – | 6% |
| Cygnal (R) | October 27–30, 2024 | 611 (LV) | ± 4.0% | 60% | 36% | – | 4% |
| UC Berkeley | October 22–28, 2024 | 4,341 (LV) | ± 2.0% | 55% | 34% | – | 11% |
| ActiVote | October 6–27, 2024 | 400 (LV) | ± 4.9% | 61% | 39% | – | – |
| ActiVote | October 1–18, 2024 | 400 (LV) | ± 4.9% | 63% | 34% | – | |
| YouGov (Note: Poll sponsored by Rose Institute of State and Local Government) | October 7–17, 2024 | 1,139 (RV) | ± 3.38% | 56% | 35% | – | 9% |
| Public Policy Institute of California | October 7–15, 2024 | 1,137 (LV) | ± 3.7% | 63% | 37% | – | – |
| Emerson College (Note: Poll sponsored by The Hill and Inside California Politics) | October 12–14, 2024 | 1,000 (LV) | ± 3.0% | 56% | 33% | – | 11% |
| UC Berkeley | September 25 – October 1, 2024 | 3,045 LV) | ± 2.5% | 53% | 36% | – | 11% |
| USC/CSULB/Cal Poly Pomona | September 12–25, 2024 | 1,685 (LV) | ± 2.4% | 56% | 37% | 1% (Note: "Skip Election" with 1%) | 6% |
| ActiVote | August 13 – September 21, 2024 | 400 (LV) | ± 4.9% | 63% | 37% | – | – |
| Public Policy Institute of California | August 29 – September 9, 2024 | 1,071 (LV) | ± 3.7% | 63% | 35% | 1% (Note: "Wouldn't vote for US Senator" with 1%) | 1% |
| Emerson College | September 3–5, 2024 | 815 (LV) | ± 3.4% | 55% | 33% | – | 13% |
| ActiVote | July 16 – August 12, 2024 | 400 (LV) | ± 4.9% | 66% | 34% | – | – |
| UC Berkeley | July 31 – August 11, 2024 | 3,765 (LV) | ± 2.0% | 53% | 33% | – | 14% |
| Public Policy Institute of California | June 24 – July 2, 2024 | 1,261 (LV) | ± 3.7% | 64% | 33% | – | 3% |
| Public Policy Institute of California | May 23 – June 2, 2024 | 1,098 (LV) | ± 3.9% | 62% | 37% | – | 1% |
| Public Policy Institute of California | March 19–25, 2024 | 1,089 (LV) | ± 3.9% | 61% | 37% | – | 2% |
| UC Berkeley | February 22–26, 2024 | 3,304 (LV) | ± 2.0% | 53% | 38% | – | 9% |

Hypothetical polling

Katie Porter vs. Adam Schiff

| Poll source | Date(s) administered | Sample size | Margin of error | Katie Porter (D) | Adam Schiff (D) | Undecided |
|---|---|---|---|---|---|---|
| UC Berkeley | February 22–26, 2024 | 3,304 (LV) | ± 2.0% | 30% | 30% | 40% |
| David Binder Research | November 19–21, 2022 | 600 (LV) | ± 4.0% | 37% | 26% | 37% (Note: Includes "Would not vote" at 19%) |

Katie Porter vs. Steve Garvey

| Poll source | Date(s) administered | Sample size | Margin of error | Katie Porter (D) | Steve Garvey (R) | Undecided |
|---|---|---|---|---|---|---|
| UC Berkeley | February 22–26, 2024 | 3,304 (LV) | ± 2.0% | 52% | 38% | 10% |

=== Debate ===
Only one debate was held between Garvey and Schiff.

2024 United States Senate election in California debate
| No. | Date | Host | Moderator | Link | Republican | Democratic |
| Key: P Participant A Absent N Not invited I Invited W Withdrawn | | | | | | |
| Key: P Participant A Absent N Not invited I Invited W Withdrawn | | | | | Steve Garvey | Adam Schiff |
|---|---|---|---|---|---|---|
| 1 | October 8, 2024 | League of Women Voters of California / ABC Owned Television Stations (KABC-TV, KGO-TV, KFSN-TV) / Univision KMEX-DT | Marc Brown; Kristen Sze; Warren Armstrong; Gabriela Teissier | YouTube | P | P |

=== Results ===
2024 United States Senate special election in California
| Party | Candidate | Votes | % | ±% |
|---|---|---|---|---|
| Democratic | Adam Schiff | 8,837,051 | 58.75% | −3.77% |
| Republican | Steve Garvey | 6,204,637 | 41.25% | +3.77% |
| Total votes | | 15,041,688 | 100.00% | N/A |
| Democratic hold | | | | |

2024 United States Senate election in California
| Party | Candidate | Votes | % | ±% |
|---|---|---|---|---|
| Democratic | Adam Schiff | 9,036,252 | 58.87% | +0.12% |
| Republican | Steve Garvey | 6,312,594 | 41.13% | –0.12% |
| Total votes | | 15,348,846 | 100.00% | N/A |
| Democratic hold | | | | |

==== Special election ====
| County | Adam Schiff Democratic | | Steve Garvey Republican | | Margin | | Total votes cast |
| County | # | % | # | % | # | % | Total votes cast |
|---|---|---|---|---|---|---|---|
| Alameda | 479,587 | 76.43% | 147,877 | 23.57% | 331,710 | 52.87% | 627,464 |
| Alpine | 452 | 62.43% | 272 | 37.57% | 180 | 24.86% | 724 |
| Amador | 7,342 | 34.32% | 14,051 | 65.68% | -6,709 | -31.36% | 21,393 |
| Butte | 41,484 | 46.34% | 48,035 | 53.66% | -6,551 | -7.32% | 89,519 |
| Calaveras | 8,766 | 34.23% | 16,841 | 65.77% | -8,075 | -31.53% | 25,607 |
| Colusa | 2,329 | 34.84% | 4,356 | 65.16% | -2,027 | -30.32% | 6,685 |
| Contra Costa | 326,626 | 67.57% | 156,743 | 32.43% | 169,883 | 35.15% | 483,369 |
| Del Norte | 4,076 | 40.43% | 6,006 | 59.57% | -1,930 | -19.14% | 10,082 |
| El Dorado | 45,184 | 41.26% | 64,334 | 58.74% | -19,150 | -17.49% | 109,518 |
| Fresno | 142,467 | 46.88% | 161,405 | 53.12% | -18,938 | -6.23% | 303,872 |
| Glenn | 2,974 | 30.17% | 6,882 | 69.83% | -3,908 | -39.65% | 9,856 |
| Humboldt | 39,381 | 63.58% | 22,554 | 36.42% | 16,827 | 27.17% | 61,935 |
| Imperial | 25,238 | 49.47% | 25,780 | 50.53% | -542 | -1.06% | 51,018 |
| Inyo | 4,028 | 46.57% | 4,621 | 53.43% | -593 | -6.86% | 8,649 |
| Kern | 105,348 | 38.88% | 165,574 | 61.12% | -60,226 | -22.23% | 270,922 |
| Kings | 14,826 | 37.44% | 24,778 | 62.56% | -9,952 | -25.13% | 39,604 |
| Lake | 12,507 | 48.64% | 13,205 | 51.36% | -698 | -2.71% | 25,712 |
| Lassen | 2,421 | 21.99% | 8,591 | 78.01% | -6,170 | -56.03% | 11,012 |
| Los Angeles | 2,323,607 | 65.32% | 1,233,740 | 34.68% | 1,089,867 | 30.64% | 3,557,347 |
| Madera | 20,326 | 38.65% | 32,269 | 61.35% | -11,943 | -22.71% | 52,595 |
| Marin | 111,448 | 79.65% | 28,470 | 20.35% | 82,978 | 59.30% | 139,918 |
| Mariposa | 3,445 | 37.98% | 5,626 | 62.02% | -2,181 | -24.04% | 9,071 |
| Mendocino | 23,559 | 62.60% | 14,073 | 37.40% | 9,486 | 25.21% | 37,632 |
| Merced | 38,716 | 48.37% | 41,325 | 51.63% | -2,609 | -3.26% | 80,041 |
| Modoc | 973 | 25.29% | 2,875 | 74.71% | -1,902 | -49.43% | 3,848 |
| Mono | 3,273 | 57.01% | 2,468 | 42.99% | 805 | 14.02% | 5,741 |
| Monterey | 89,517 | 63.80% | 50,798 | 36.20% | 38,719 | 27.59% | 140,315 |
| Napa | 40,774 | 65.44% | 21,531 | 34.56% | 19,243 | 30.89% | 62,305 |
| Nevada | 33,068 | 54.45% | 27,666 | 45.55% | 5,402 | 8.89% | 60,734 |
| Orange | 666,586 | 49.37% | 683,720 | 50.63% | -17,134 | -1.27% | 1,350,306 |
| Placer | 96,631 | 43.13% | 127,407 | 56.87% | -30,776 | -13.74% | 224,038 |
| Plumas | 3,833 | 39.82% | 5,792 | 60.18% | -1,959 | -20.35% | 9,625 |
| Riverside | 422,441 | 48.29% | 452,303 | 51.71% | -29,862 | -3.41% | 874,744 |
| Sacramento | 367,095 | 58.56% | 259,828 | 41.44% | 107,267 | 17.11% | 626,923 |
| San Benito | 14,540 | 55.42% | 11,696 | 44.58% | 2,844 | 10.84% | 26,236 |
| San Bernardino | 340,543 | 47.83% | 371,453 | 52.17% | -30,910 | -4.34% | 711,996 |
| San Diego | 797,127 | 56.61% | 610,883 | 43.39% | 186,244 | 13.23% | 1,408,010 |
| San Francisco | 307,511 | 82.43% | 65,547 | 17.57% | 241,964 | 64.86% | 373,058 |
| San Joaquin | 124,366 | 49.57% | 126,529 | 50.43% | -2,163 | -0.86% | 250,895 |
| San Luis Obispo | 76,081 | 52.96% | 67,580 | 47.04% | 8,501 | 5.92% | 143,661 |
| San Mateo | 232,279 | 73.58% | 83,392 | 26.42% | 148,887 | 47.17% | 315,671 |
| Santa Barbara | 108,179 | 61.34% | 68,195 | 38.66% | 39,984 | 22.67% | 176,374 |
| Santa Clara | 482,259 | 68.85% | 218,236 | 31.15% | 264,023 | 37.69% | 700,495 |
| Santa Cruz | 96,520 | 76.00% | 30,488 | 24.00% | 66,032 | 51.99% | 127,008 |
| Shasta | 25,711 | 29.99% | 60,028 | 70.01% | -34,317 | -40.02% | 85,739 |
| Sierra | 612 | 35.71% | 1,102 | 64.29% | -490 | -28.59% | 1,714 |
| Siskiyou | 7,916 | 38.61% | 12,589 | 61.39% | -4,673 | -22.79% | 20,505 |
| Solano | 110,787 | 60.66% | 71,846 | 39.34% | 38,941 | 21.32% | 182,633 |
| Sonoma | 165,371 | 71.90% | 64,641 | 28.10% | 100,730 | 43.79% | 230,012 |
| Stanislaus | 82,972 | 44.44% | 103,743 | 55.56% | -20,771 | -11.12% | 186,715 |
| Sutter | 12,651 | 34.07% | 24,486 | 65.93% | -11,835 | -31.87% | 37,137 |
| Tehama | 6,875 | 27.69% | 17,956 | 72.31% | -11,081 | -44.63% | 24,831 |
| Trinity | 2,350 | 42.88% | 3,130 | 57.12% | -780 | -14.23% | 5,480 |
| Tulare | 49,623 | 38.16% | 80,424 | 61.84% | -30,801 | -23.68% | 130,047 |
| Tuolumne | 10,204 | 37.29% | 17,159 | 62.71% | -6,955 | -25.42% | 27,363 |
| Ventura | 201,885 | 55.20% | 163,861 | 44.80% | 38,024 | 10.40% | 365,746 |
| Yolo | 60,079 | 66.96% | 29,650 | 33.04% | 30,429 | 33.91% | 89,729 |
| Yuba | 10,282 | 36.07% | 18,227 | 63.93% | -7,945 | -27.87% | 28,509 |
| Totals | 8,837,051 | 58.75% | 6,204,637 | 41.25% | 2,632,414 | 17.50% | 15,041,688 |

==== Counties that flipped from Democratic to Republican ====
- Fresno (largest municipality: Fresno)
- Imperial (largest municipality: El Centro)
- Lake (largest municipality: Clearlake)
- Merced (largest municipality: Merced)
- Riverside (largest municipality: Riverside)
- San Bernardino (largest municipality: San Bernardino)
- San Joaquin (largest municipality: Stockton)
- Stanislaus (largest municipality: Modesto)

==== Regular election ====
| County | Adam Schiff Democratic | | Steve Garvey Republican | | Margin | | Total votes cast |
| County | # | % | # | % | # | % | Total votes cast |
|---|---|---|---|---|---|---|---|
| Alameda | 489,039 | 76.80% | 147,721 | 23.20% | 341,318 | 53.60% | 636,760 |
| Alpine | 463 | 63.86% | 262 | 36.14% | 201 | 27.72% | 725 |
| Amador | 7,454 | 33.90% | 14,534 | 66.10% | -7,080 | -32.20% | 21,988 |
| Butte | 42,417 | 46.30% | 49,192 | 53.70% | -6,775 | -7.40% | 91,609 |
| Calaveras | 8,956 | 34.36% | 17,109 | 65.64% | -8,153 | -31.28% | 26,065 |
| Colusa | 2,436 | 35.27% | 4,471 | 64.73% | -2,035 | -29.46% | 6,907 |
| Contra Costa | 343,169 | 67.50% | 165,245 | 32.50% | 177,924 | 35.00% | 508,414 |
| Del Norte | 4,217 | 40.94% | 6,084 | 59.06% | -1,867 | -18.12% | 10,301 |
| El Dorado | 45,734 | 41.43% | 64,663 | 58.57% | -18,929 | -17.15% | 110,397 |
| Fresno | 148,396 | 47.10% | 166,675 | 52.90% | -18,279 | -5.80% | 315,071 |
| Glenn | 3,122 | 30.50% | 7,114 | 69.50% | -3,992 | -39.00% | 10,236 |
| Humboldt | 40,240 | 63.84% | 22,793 | 36.16% | 17,447 | 27.68% | 63,033 |
| Imperial | 26,441 | 49.87% | 26,579 | 50.13% | -138 | -0.26% | 53,020 |
| Inyo | 4,134 | 46.94% | 4,673 | 53.06% | -539 | -6.12% | 8,807 |
| Kern | 107,501 | 38.96% | 168,458 | 61.04% | -60,957 | -22.09% | 275,959 |
| Kings | 15,225 | 37.52% | 25,354 | 62.48% | -10,129 | -24.96% | 40,579 |
| Lake | 12,797 | 48.85% | 13,401 | 51.15% | -604 | -2.31% | 26,198 |
| Lassen | 2,439 | 21.91% | 8,691 | 78.09% | -6,252 | -56.17% | 11,130 |
| Los Angeles | 2,335,222 | 65.67% | 1,220,750 | 34.33% | 1,114,472 | 31.34% | 3,555,972 |
| Madera | 20,538 | 38.76% | 32,451 | 61.24% | -11,913 | -22.48% | 52,989 |
| Marin | 112,842 | 79.84% | 28,490 | 20.16% | 84,352 | 59.68% | 141,332 |
| Mariposa | 3,582 | 38.40% | 5,747 | 61.60% | -2,165 | -23.21% | 9,329 |
| Mendocino | 24,106 | 62.96% | 14,182 | 37.04% | 9,924 | 25.92% | 38,288 |
| Merced | 40,394 | 48.25% | 43,320 | 51.75% | -2,926 | -3.50% | 83,714 |
| Modoc | 978 | 24.89% | 2,951 | 75.11% | -1,973 | -50.22% | 3,929 |
| Mono | 3,384 | 57.48% | 2,503 | 42.52% | 881 | 14.97% | 5,887 |
| Monterey | 92,302 | 64.00% | 51,913 | 36.00% | 40,389 | 28.01% | 144,215 |
| Napa | 42,245 | 65.77% | 21,986 | 34.23% | 20,259 | 31.54% | 64,231 |
| Nevada | 33,363 | 54.38% | 27,987 | 45.62% | 5,376 | 8.76% | 61,350 |
| Orange | 674,882 | 49.48% | 688,967 | 50.52% | -14,085 | -1.03% | 1,363,849 |
| Placer | 98,198 | 43.04% | 129,981 | 56.96% | -31,783 | -13.93% | 228,179 |
| Plumas | 3,921 | 39.39% | 6,034 | 60.61% | -2,113 | -21.23% | 9,955 |
| Riverside | 443,181 | 48.31% | 474,241 | 51.69% | -31,060 | -3.39% | 917,422 |
| Sacramento | 375,265 | 58.71% | 263,954 | 41.29% | 111,311 | 17.41% | 639,219 |
| San Benito | 14,991 | 55.48% | 12,031 | 44.52% | 2,960 | 10.95% | 27,022 |
| San Bernardino | 355,667 | 48.08% | 384,091 | 51.92% | -28,424 | -3.84% | 739,758 |
| San Diego | 817,805 | 56.68% | 625,129 | 43.32% | 192,676 | 13.35% | 1,442,934 |
| San Francisco | 310,932 | 82.40% | 66,421 | 17.60% | 244,511 | 64.80% | 377,353 |
| San Joaquin | 127,205 | 49.64% | 129,064 | 50.36% | -1,859 | -0.73% | 256,269 |
| San Luis Obispo | 77,525 | 53.07% | 68,569 | 46.93% | 8,956 | 6.13% | 146,094 |
| San Mateo | 237,186 | 73.74% | 84,474 | 26.26% | 152,712 | 47.48% | 321,660 |
| Santa Barbara | 110,609 | 61.20% | 70,126 | 38.80% | 40,483 | 22.40% | 180,735 |
| Santa Clara | 498,785 | 68.95% | 224,597 | 31.05% | 274,188 | 37.90% | 723,382 |
| Santa Cruz | 98,631 | 76.24% | 30,737 | 23.76% | 67,894 | 52.48% | 129,368 |
| Shasta | 25,996 | 29.74% | 61,402 | 70.26% | -35,406 | -40.51% | 87,398 |
| Sierra | 617 | 35.73% | 1,110 | 64.27% | -493 | -28.55% | 1,727 |
| Siskiyou | 8,087 | 38.43% | 12,958 | 61.57% | -4,871 | -23.15% | 21,045 |
| Solano | 113,204 | 60.99% | 72,404 | 39.01% | 40,800 | 21.98% | 185,608 |
| Sonoma | 176,477 | 71.98% | 68,712 | 28.02% | 107,765 | 43.95% | 245,189 |
| Stanislaus | 86,040 | 44.70% | 106,444 | 55.30% | -20,404 | -10.60% | 192,484 |
| Sutter | 12,984 | 34.07% | 25,129 | 65.93% | -12,145 | -31.87% | 38,113 |
| Tehama | 7,098 | 27.59% | 18,632 | 72.41% | -11,534 | -44.83% | 25,730 |
| Trinity | 2,413 | 43.39% | 3,148 | 56.61% | -735 | -13.22% | 5,561 |
| Tulare | 51,972 | 38.38% | 83,439 | 61.62% | -31,467 | -23.24% | 135,411 |
| Tuolumne | 10,479 | 37.63% | 17,372 | 62.37% | -6,893 | -24.75% | 27,851 |
| Ventura | 211,381 | 55.47% | 169,660 | 44.53% | 41,721 | 10.95% | 381,041 |
| Yolo | 61,084 | 67.24% | 29,758 | 32.76% | 31,326 | 34.48% | 90,842 |
| Yuba | 10,501 | 35.95% | 18,711 | 64.05% | -8,210 | -28.10% | 29,212 |
| Totals | 9,036,252 | 58.87% | 6,312,594 | 41.13% | 2,723,658 | 17.75% | 15,348,846 |

==== By congressional district ====
Schiff won 39 of 52 congressional districts in the special and regular elections, with the remaining 13 going to Garvey, including four that elected Democrats.

| District | Schiff | Garvey | Representative |
|---|---|---|---|
| 1st | 35.8% | 64.2% | Doug LaMalfa |
| 2nd | 71.2% | 28.8% | Jared Huffman |
| 3rd | 45.6% | 54.4% | Kevin Kiley |
| 4th | 64.5% | 35.5% | Mike Thompson |
| 5th | 39.6% | 60.4% | Tom McClintock |
| 6th | 55.8% | 44.2% | Ami Bera |
| 7th | 64.3% | 35.7% | Doris Matsui |
| 8th | 72.2% | 27.8% | John Garamendi |
| 9th | 49.0% | 51.0% | Josh Harder |
| 10th | 64.5% | 35.5% | Mark DeSaulnier |
| 11th | 83.5% | 16.5% | Nancy Pelosi |
| 12th | 87.9% | 12.1% | Barbara Lee (118th Congress) |
| 12th | 87.9% | 12.1% | Lateefah Simon (119th Congress) |
| 13th | 48.1% | 51.9% | John Duarte (118th Congress) |
| 13th | 48.1% | 51.9% | Adam Gray (119th Congress) |
| 14th | 67.0% | 33.0% | Eric Swalwell |
| 15th | 73.4% | 26.6% | Kevin Mullin |
| 16th | 72.1% | 27.9% | Anna Eshoo (118th Congress) |
| 16th | 72.1% | 27.9% | Sam Liccardo (119th Congress) |
| 17th | 68.4% | 31.6% | Ro Khanna |
| 18th | 64.8% | 35.2% | Zoe Lofgren |
| 19th | 65.7% | 34.3% | Jimmy Panetta |
| 20th | 33.5% | 66.5% | Vince Fong |
| 21st | 51.5% | 48.5% | Jim Costa |
| 22nd | 47.3% | 52.7% | David Valadao |
| 23rd | 40.7% | 59.3% | Jay Obernolte |
| 24th | 60.3% | 39.7% | Salud Carbajal |
| 25th | 50.7% | 49.3% | Raul Ruiz |
| 26th | 54.5% | 45.5% | Julia Brownley |
| 27th | 50.9% | 49.1% | Mike Garcia (118th Congress) |
| 27th | 50.9% | 49.1% | George Whitesides (119th Congress) |
| 28th | 61.9% | 38.1% | Judy Chu |
| 29th | 67.9% | 32.1% | Tony Cárdenas (118th Congress) |
| 29th | 67.9% | 32.1% | Luz Rivas (119th Congress) |
| 30th | 71.7% | 28.3% | Adam Schiff (118th Congress) |
| 30th | 71.7% | 28.3% | Laura Friedman (119th Congress) |
| 31st | 57.4% | 42.6% | Grace Napolitano (118th Congress) |
| 31st | 57.4% | 42.6% | Gil Cisneros (119th Congress) |
| 32nd | 64.8% | 35.2% | Brad Sherman |
| 33rd | 53.9% | 46.1% | Pete Aguilar |
| 34th | 76.2% | 23.8% | Jimmy Gomez |
| 35th | 54.6% | 45.4% | Norma Torres |
| 36th | 66.8% | 33.2% | Ted Lieu |
| 37th | 79.9% | 20.1% | Sydney Kamlager-Dove |
| 38th | 56.8% | 43.2% | Linda Sánchez |
| 39th | 54.6% | 45.4% | Mark Takano |
| 40th | 46.1% | 53.9% | Young Kim |
| 41st | 45.6% | 54.4% | Ken Calvert |
| 42nd | 65.2% | 34.8% | Robert Garcia |
| 43rd | 73.7% | 26.3% | Maxine Waters |
| 44th | 66.2% | 33.8% | Nanette Barragán |
| 45th | 49.5% | 50.5% | Michelle Steel (118th Congress) |
| 45th | 49.5% | 50.5% | Derek Tran (119th Congress) |
| 46th | 59.2% | 40.8% | Lou Correa |
| 47th | 49.8% | 50.2% | Katie Porter (118th Congress) |
| 47th | 49.8% | 50.2% | Dave Min (119th Congress) |
| 48th | 40.3% | 59.7% | Darrell Issa |
| 49th | 51.2% | 48.8% | Mike Levin |
| 50th | 62.3% | 37.7% | Scott Peters |
| 51st | 60.3% | 39.7% | Sara Jacobs |
| 52nd | 60.6% | 39.4% | Juan Vargas |

==== By city (regular election) ====
By municipality

Official outcome by city and unincorporated areas of counties, of which Schiff won 337 and Garvey won 203
| City | County | Adam Schiff Democratic | | Steve Garvey Republican | | Margin | | Total votes | Swing from 2024 presidential (Harris to Schiff) % |
| City | County | # | % | # | % | # | % | Total votes | Swing from 2024 presidential (Harris to Schiff) % |
|---|---|---|---|---|---|---|---|---|---|
| Alameda | Alameda | 30,634 | 81.00% | 7,184 | 19.00% | 23,450 | 62.01% | 37,818 | -1.66% |
| Albany | Alameda | 8,303 | 89.75% | 948 | 10.25% | 7,355 | 79.50% | 9,251 | 1.14% |
| Berkeley | Alameda | 51,924 | 93.57% | 3,567 | 6.43% | 48,357 | 87.14% | 55,491 | 2.50% |
| Dublin | Alameda | 17,276 | 66.50% | 8,701 | 33.50% | 8,575 | 33.01% | 25,977 | -2.78% |
| Emeryville | Alameda | 4,537 | 89.58% | 528 | 10.42% | 4,009 | 79.15% | 5,065 | 3.07% |
| Fremont | Alameda | 52,618 | 66.41% | 26,609 | 33.59% | 26,009 | 32.83% | 79,227 | -1.22% |
| Hayward | Alameda | 34,663 | 72.37% | 13,233 | 27.63% | 21,430 | 44.74% | 47,896 | 2.56% |
| Livermore | Alameda | 25,427 | 60.03% | 16,930 | 39.97% | 8,497 | 20.06% | 42,357 | -4.68% |
| Newark | Alameda | 11,117 | 67.79% | 5,281 | 32.21% | 5,836 | 35.59% | 16,398 | 0.49% |
| Oakland | Alameda | 145,011 | 89.61% | 16,811 | 10.39% | 128,200 | 79.22% | 161,822 | 3.01% |
| Piedmont | Alameda | 5,991 | 83.57% | 1,178 | 16.43% | 4,813 | 67.14% | 7,169 | -7.65% |
| Pleasanton | Alameda | 22,890 | 63.91% | 12,924 | 36.09% | 9,966 | 27.83% | 35,814 | -6.86% |
| San Leandro | Alameda | 22,730 | 73.24% | 8,305 | 26.76% | 14,425 | 46.48% | 31,035 | 0.97% |
| Union City | Alameda | 17,691 | 69.83% | 7,642 | 30.17% | 10,049 | 39.67% | 25,333 | 2.74% |
| Unincorporated area | Alameda | 38,227 | 68.13% | 17,880 | 31.87% | 20,347 | 36.26% | 56,107 | -1.04% |
| Unincorporated area | Alpine | 463 | 63.86% | 262 | 36.14% | 201 | 27.72% | 725 | -4.25% |
| Amador | Amador | 86 | 63.24% | 50 | 36.76% | 36 | 26.47% | 136 | -5.41% |
| Ione | Amador | 825 | 26.87% | 2,245 | 73.13% | -1,420 | -46.25% | 3,070 | -5.67% |
| Jackson | Amador | 1,023 | 39.85% | 1,544 | 60.15% | -521 | -20.30% | 2,567 | -5.59% |
| Plymouth | Amador | 218 | 33.90% | 425 | 66.10% | -207 | -32.19% | 643 | -5.07% |
| Sutter Creek | Amador | 680 | 43.34% | 889 | 56.66% | -209 | -13.32% | 1,569 | -4.80% |
| Unincorporated area | Amador | 4,622 | 33.01% | 9,381 | 66.99% | -4,759 | -33.99% | 14,003 | -3.79% |
| Biggs | Butte | 207 | 29.66% | 491 | 70.34% | -284 | -40.69% | 698 | -2.77% |
| Chico | Butte | 25,950 | 59.59% | 17,595 | 40.41% | 8,355 | 19.19% | 43,545 | -4.35% |
| Gridley | Butte | 965 | 41.01% | 1,388 | 58.99% | -423 | -17.98% | 2,353 | -2.54% |
| Oroville | Butte | 2,252 | 38.08% | 3,662 | 61.92% | -1,410 | -23.84% | 5,914 | -0.51% |
| Paradise | Butte | 1,930 | 34.38% | 3,683 | 65.62% | -1,753 | -31.23% | 5,613 | -5.17% |
| Unincorporated area | Butte | 11,113 | 33.19% | 22,373 | 66.81% | -11,260 | -33.63% | 33,486 | -4.77% |
| Angels | Calaveras | 751 | 36.76% | 1,292 | 63.24% | -541 | -26.48% | 2,043 | -4.99% |
| Unincorporated area | Calaveras | 8,205 | 34.16% | 15,817 | 65.84% | -7,612 | -31.69% | 24,022 | -3.01% |
| Colusa | Colusa | 770 | 35.08% | 1,425 | 64.92% | -655 | -29.84% | 2,195 | -2.77% |
| Williams | Colusa | 586 | 51.68% | 548 | 48.32% | 38 | 3.35% | 1,134 | 1.12% |
| Unincorporated area | Colusa | 1,080 | 30.18% | 2,498 | 69.82% | -1,418 | -39.63% | 3,578 | -0.83% |
| Antioch | Contra Costa | 27,233 | 66.06% | 13,989 | 33.94% | 13,244 | 32.13% | 41,222 | 0.10% |
| Brentwood | Contra Costa | 17,027 | 54.48% | 14,228 | 45.52% | 2,799 | 8.96% | 31,255 | -3.49% |
| Clayton | Contra Costa | 3,791 | 54.74% | 3,134 | 45.26% | 657 | 9.49% | 6,925 | -8.74% |
| Concord | Contra Costa | 33,732 | 65.81% | 17,522 | 34.19% | 16,210 | 31.63% | 51,254 | -3.59% |
| Danville | Contra Costa | 15,157 | 58.64% | 10,689 | 41.36% | 4,468 | 17.29% | 25,846 | -9.45% |
| El Cerrito | Contra Costa | 12,218 | 88.63% | 1,567 | 11.37% | 10,651 | 77.27% | 13,785 | 1.75% |
| Hercules | Contra Costa | 8,900 | 75.42% | 2,900 | 24.58% | 6,000 | 50.85% | 11,800 | 1.17% |
| Lafayette | Contra Costa | 11,279 | 73.08% | 4,155 | 26.92% | 7,124 | 46.16% | 15,434 | -8.96% |
| Martinez | Contra Costa | 13,350 | 66.32% | 6,779 | 33.68% | 6,571 | 32.64% | 20,129 | -4.00% |
| Moraga | Contra Costa | 6,679 | 72.12% | 2,582 | 27.88% | 4,097 | 44.24% | 9,261 | -9.08% |
| Oakley | Contra Costa | 9,800 | 53.31% | 8,583 | 46.69% | 1,217 | 6.62% | 18,383 | -0.37% |
| Orinda | Contra Costa | 9,075 | 74.40% | 3,123 | 25.60% | 5,952 | 48.79% | 12,198 | -8.97% |
| Pinole | Contra Costa | 6,196 | 72.69% | 2,328 | 27.31% | 3,868 | 45.38% | 8,524 | 0.83% |
| Pittsburg | Contra Costa | 17,228 | 69.96% | 7,397 | 30.04% | 9,831 | 39.92% | 24,625 | 1.05% |
| Pleasant Hill | Contra Costa | 12,716 | 70.50% | 5,320 | 29.50% | 7,396 | 41.01% | 18,036 | -4.24% |
| Richmond | Contra Costa | 30,551 | 83.34% | 6,107 | 16.66% | 24,444 | 66.68% | 36,658 | 3.12% |
| San Pablo | Contra Costa | 5,541 | 77.78% | 1,583 | 22.22% | 3,958 | 55.56% | 7,124 | 4.41% |
| San Ramon | Contra Costa | 24,198 | 65.03% | 13,010 | 34.97% | 11,188 | 30.07% | 37,208 | -3.63% |
| Walnut Creek | Contra Costa | 28,256 | 72.12% | 10,923 | 27.88% | 17,333 | 44.24% | 39,179 | -5.89% |
| Unincorporated area | Contra Costa | 50,242 | 63.14% | 29,326 | 36.86% | 20,916 | 26.29% | 79,568 | -3.42% |
| Crescent City | Del Norte | 604 | 49.71% | 611 | 50.29% | -7 | -0.58% | 1,215 | 0.69% |
| Unincorporated area | Del Norte | 3,613 | 39.76% | 5,473 | 60.24% | -1,860 | -20.47% | 9,086 | -2.01% |
| Placerville | El Dorado | 2,465 | 48.91% | 2,575 | 51.09% | -110 | -2.18% | 5,040 | -4.08% |
| South Lake Tahoe | El Dorado | 5,381 | 61.72% | 3,338 | 38.28% | 2,043 | 23.43% | 8,719 | -3.58% |
| Unincorporated area | El Dorado | 37,888 | 39.21% | 58,750 | 60.79% | -20,862 | -21.59% | 96,638 | -5.29% |
| Clovis | Fresno | 20,665 | 38.54% | 32,953 | 61.46% | -12,288 | -22.92% | 53,618 | -2.50% |
| Coalinga | Fresno | 1,428 | 39.69% | 2,170 | 60.31% | -742 | -20.62% | 3,598 | -2.98% |
| Firebaugh | Fresno | 972 | 58.20% | 698 | 41.80% | 274 | 16.41% | 1,670 | 4.04% |
| Fowler | Fresno | 1,332 | 45.98% | 1,565 | 54.02% | -233 | -8.04% | 2,897 | 2.25% |
| Fresno | Fresno | 83,919 | 53.66% | 72,457 | 46.34% | 11,462 | 7.33% | 156,376 | -0.88% |
| Huron | Fresno | 439 | 67.85% | 208 | 32.15% | 231 | 35.70% | 647 | 0.27% |
| Kerman | Fresno | 2,124 | 49.03% | 2,208 | 50.97% | -84 | -1.94% | 4,332 | 3.88% |
| Kingsburg | Fresno | 1,594 | 28.46% | 4,006 | 71.54% | -2,412 | -43.07% | 5,600 | -5.44% |
| Mendota | Fresno | 854 | 58.98% | 594 | 41.02% | 260 | 17.96% | 1,448 | 4.73% |
| Orange Cove | Fresno | 986 | 60.49% | 644 | 39.51% | 342 | 20.98% | 1,630 | 5.58% |
| Parlier | Fresno | 1,597 | 65.69% | 834 | 34.31% | 763 | 31.39% | 2,431 | 4.37% |
| Reedley | Fresno | 3,073 | 46.36% | 3,555 | 53.64% | -482 | -7.27% | 6,628 | -1.35% |
| San Joaquin | Fresno | 405 | 73.77% | 144 | 26.23% | 261 | 47.54% | 549 | 1.87% |
| Sanger | Fresno | 3,999 | 53.56% | 3,468 | 46.44% | 531 | 7.11% | 7,467 | 0.39% |
| Selma | Fresno | 3,158 | 50.13% | 3,142 | 49.87% | 16 | 0.25% | 6,300 | -0.30% |
| Unincorporated area | Fresno | 21,851 | 36.49% | 38,029 | 63.51% | -16,178 | -27.02% | 59,880 | -2.72% |
| Orland | Glenn | 1,024 | 39.48% | 1,570 | 60.52% | -546 | -21.05% | 2,594 | -4.98% |
| Willows | Glenn | 693 | 33.08% | 1,402 | 66.92% | -709 | -33.84% | 2,095 | -4.33% |
| Unincorporated area | Glenn | 1,405 | 25.33% | 4,142 | 74.67% | -2,737 | -49.34% | 5,547 | -3.57% |
| Arcata | Humboldt | 7,233 | 85.34% | 1,243 | 14.66% | 5,990 | 70.67% | 8,476 | 3.28% |
| Blue Lake | Humboldt | 499 | 74.04% | 175 | 25.96% | 324 | 48.07% | 674 | -0.17% |
| Eureka | Humboldt | 8,014 | 69.66% | 3,490 | 30.34% | 4,524 | 39.33% | 11,504 | 0.10% |
| Ferndale | Humboldt | 454 | 51.30% | 431 | 48.70% | 23 | 2.60% | 885 | -5.36% |
| Fortuna | Humboldt | 2,373 | 44.84% | 2,919 | 55.16% | -546 | -10.32% | 5,292 | -2.96% |
| Rio Dell | Humboldt | 493 | 37.75% | 813 | 62.25% | -320 | -24.50% | 1,306 | -0.57% |
| Trinidad | Humboldt | 166 | 74.44% | 57 | 25.56% | 109 | 48.88% | 223 | -3.52% |
| Unincorporated area | Humboldt | 21,008 | 60.59% | 13,665 | 39.41% | 7,343 | 21.18% | 34,673 | -1.46% |
| Brawley | Imperial | 3,821 | 48.40% | 4,074 | 51.60% | -253 | -3.20% | 7,895 | 1.40% |
| Calexico | Imperial | 7,067 | 59.41% | 4,828 | 40.59% | 2,239 | 18.82% | 11,895 | 1.48% |
| Calipatria | Imperial | 426 | 49.13% | 441 | 50.87% | -15 | -1.73% | 867 | 0.72% |
| El Centro | Imperial | 7,084 | 51.79% | 6,593 | 48.21% | 491 | 3.59% | 13,677 | 0.61% |
| Holtville | Imperial | 866 | 47.87% | 943 | 52.13% | -77 | -4.26% | 1,809 | 0.38% |
| Imperial | Imperial | 3,259 | 41.57% | 4,581 | 58.43% | -1,322 | -16.86% | 7,840 | 0.14% |
| Westmorland | Imperial | 275 | 56.24% | 214 | 43.76% | 61 | 12.47% | 489 | -2.48% |
| Unincorporated area | Imperial | 3,643 | 42.62% | 4,905 | 57.38% | -1,262 | -14.76% | 8,548 | -0.76% |
| Bishop | Inyo | 909 | 56.35% | 704 | 43.65% | 205 | 12.71% | 1,613 | -2.09% |
| Unincorporated area | Inyo | 3,225 | 44.83% | 3,969 | 55.17% | -744 | -10.34% | 7,194 | -3.36% |
| Arvin | Kern | 1,822 | 61.12% | 1,159 | 38.88% | 663 | 22.24% | 2,981 | 2.65% |
| Bakersfield | Kern | 56,199 | 41.90% | 77,934 | 58.10% | -21,735 | -16.20% | 134,133 | -0.78% |
| California City | Kern | 1,774 | 45.37% | 2,136 | 54.63% | -362 | -9.26% | 3,910 | -2.36% |
| Delano | Kern | 5,030 | 55.84% | 3,978 | 44.16% | 1,052 | 11.68% | 9,008 | 3.00% |
| Maricopa | Kern | 45 | 14.38% | 268 | 85.62% | -223 | -71.25% | 313 | -3.28% |
| McFarland | Kern | 1,280 | 56.89% | 970 | 43.11% | 310 | 13.78% | 2,250 | 4.93% |
| Ridgecrest | Kern | 4,035 | 35.07% | 7,469 | 64.93% | -3,434 | -29.85% | 11,504 | -5.15% |
| Shafter | Kern | 2,327 | 39.50% | 3,564 | 60.50% | -1,237 | -21.00% | 5,891 | 2.67% |
| Taft | Kern | 383 | 17.34% | 1,826 | 82.66% | -1,443 | -65.32% | 2,209 | -1.97% |
| Tehachapi | Kern | 1,255 | 32.41% | 2,617 | 67.59% | -1,362 | -35.18% | 3,872 | -3.22% |
| Wasco | Kern | 2,111 | 48.22% | 2,267 | 51.78% | -156 | -3.56% | 4,378 | 1.85% |
| Unincorporated area | Kern | 31,240 | 32.71% | 64,270 | 67.29% | -33,030 | -34.58% | 95,510 | -1.66% |
| Avenal | Kings | 653 | 50.19% | 648 | 49.81% | 5 | 0.38% | 1,301 | 1.43% |
| Corcoran | Kings | 1,357 | 50.22% | 1,345 | 49.78% | 12 | 0.44% | 2,702 | 2.70% |
| Hanford | Kings | 7,781 | 38.19% | 12,594 | 61.81% | -4,813 | -23.62% | 20,375 | -2.56% |
| Lemoore | Kings | 3,148 | 37.40% | 5,270 | 62.60% | -2,122 | -25.21% | 8,418 | -2.22% |
| Unincorporated area | Kings | 2,286 | 29.37% | 5,497 | 70.63% | -3,211 | -41.26% | 7,783 | -1.96% |
| Clearlake | Lake | 2,084 | 50.90% | 2,010 | 49.10% | 74 | 1.81% | 4,094 | 0.24% |
| Lakeport | Lake | 1,185 | 51.75% | 1,105 | 48.25% | 80 | 3.49% | 2,290 | -1.41% |
| Unincorporated area | Lake | 9,528 | 48.09% | 10,286 | 51.91% | -758 | -3.83% | 19,814 | -1.11% |
| Susanville | Lassen | 974 | 26.59% | 2,689 | 73.41% | -1,715 | -46.82% | 3,663 | -1.22% |
| Unincorporated area | Lassen | 1,465 | 19.62% | 6,002 | 80.38% | -4,537 | -60.76% | 7,467 | -2.56% |
| Agoura Hills | Los Angeles | 6,924 | 58.77% | 4,857 | 41.23% | 2,067 | 17.55% | 11,781 | -5.21% |
| Alhambra | Los Angeles | 18,396 | 65.90% | 9,518 | 34.10% | 8,878 | 31.80% | 27,914 | 0.26% |
| Arcadia | Los Angeles | 10,917 | 52.85% | 9,738 | 47.15% | 1,179 | 5.71% | 20,655 | -5.12% |
| Artesia | Los Angeles | 3,036 | 56.43% | 2,344 | 43.57% | 692 | 12.86% | 5,380 | 2.18% |
| Avalon | Los Angeles | 584 | 52.90% | 520 | 47.10% | 64 | 5.80% | 1,104 | -7.92% |
| Azusa | Los Angeles | 8,826 | 59.78% | 5,939 | 40.22% | 2,887 | 19.55% | 14,765 | -1.68% |
| Baldwin Park | Los Angeles | 11,684 | 64.25% | 6,501 | 35.75% | 5,183 | 28.50% | 18,185 | -0.10% |
| Bell | Los Angeles | 4,855 | 66.86% | 2,406 | 33.14% | 2,449 | 33.73% | 7,261 | 1.83% |
| Bell Gardens | Los Angeles | 5,328 | 68.03% | 2,504 | 31.97% | 2,824 | 36.06% | 7,832 | 1.74% |
| Bellflower | Los Angeles | 14,431 | 60.72% | 9,336 | 39.28% | 5,095 | 21.44% | 23,767 | -0.20% |
| Beverly Hills | Los Angeles | 7,970 | 47.29% | 8,882 | 52.71% | -912 | -5.41% | 16,852 | -0.56% |
| Bradbury | Los Angeles | 200 | 45.77% | 237 | 54.23% | -37 | -8.47% | 437 | -4.87% |
| Burbank | Los Angeles | 33,144 | 66.85% | 16,438 | 33.15% | 16,706 | 33.69% | 49,582 | -0.16% |
| Calabasas | Los Angeles | 7,256 | 57.36% | 5,394 | 42.64% | 1,862 | 14.72% | 12,650 | -3.32% |
| Carson | Los Angeles | 26,239 | 70.25% | 11,111 | 29.75% | 15,128 | 40.50% | 37,350 | -1.46% |
| Cerritos | Los Angeles | 13,517 | 57.08% | 10,162 | 42.92% | 3,355 | 14.17% | 23,679 | -4.24% |
| Claremont | Los Angeles | 11,792 | 65.72% | 6,150 | 34.28% | 5,642 | 31.45% | 17,942 | -4.64% |
| Commerce | Los Angeles | 2,737 | 68.24% | 1,274 | 31.76% | 1,463 | 36.47% | 4,011 | 1.17% |
| Compton | Los Angeles | 17,921 | 77.28% | 5,270 | 22.72% | 12,651 | 54.55% | 23,191 | -1.12% |
| Covina | Los Angeles | 11,103 | 55.32% | 8,968 | 44.68% | 2,135 | 10.64% | 20,071 | -2.08% |
| Cudahy | Los Angeles | 2,956 | 69.96% | 1,269 | 30.04% | 1,687 | 39.93% | 4,225 | 3.79% |
| Culver City | Los Angeles | 17,362 | 80.66% | 4,162 | 19.34% | 13,200 | 61.33% | 21,524 | -3.31% |
| Diamond Bar | Los Angeles | 11,262 | 52.02% | 10,386 | 47.98% | 876 | 4.05% | 21,648 | -3.28% |
| Downey | Los Angeles | 22,982 | 57.26% | 17,154 | 42.74% | 5,828 | 14.52% | 40,136 | -1.76% |
| Duarte | Los Angeles | 5,718 | 62.38% | 3,449 | 37.62% | 2,269 | 24.75% | 9,167 | -0.88% |
| El Monte | Los Angeles | 13,844 | 62.41% | 8,338 | 37.59% | 5,506 | 24.82% | 22,182 | 1.13% |
| El Segundo | Los Angeles | 5,828 | 61.09% | 3,712 | 38.91% | 2,116 | 22.18% | 9,540 | -8.22% |
| Gardena | Los Angeles | 14,891 | 70.70% | 6,171 | 29.30% | 8,720 | 41.40% | 21,062 | -1.48% |
| Glendale | Los Angeles | 42,985 | 60.45% | 28,129 | 39.55% | 14,856 | 20.89% | 71,114 | 8.47% |
| Glendora | Los Angeles | 11,547 | 44.86% | 14,194 | 55.14% | -2,647 | -10.28% | 25,741 | -4.82% |
| Hawaiian Gardens | Los Angeles | 2,118 | 62.66% | 1,262 | 37.34% | 856 | 25.33% | 3,380 | -1.21% |
| Hawthorne | Los Angeles | 17,947 | 71.72% | 7,075 | 28.28% | 10,872 | 43.45% | 25,022 | -2.01% |
| Hermosa Beach | Los Angeles | 7,157 | 63.87% | 4,048 | 36.13% | 3,109 | 27.75% | 11,205 | -9.51% |
| Hidden Hills | Los Angeles | 511 | 49.42% | 523 | 50.58% | -12 | -1.16% | 1,034 | -10.85% |
| Huntington Park | Los Angeles | 7,657 | 70.31% | 3,234 | 29.69% | 4,423 | 40.61% | 10,891 | 1.54% |
| Industry | Los Angeles | 31 | 46.27% | 36 | 53.73% | -5 | -7.46% | 67 | -0.32% |
| Inglewood | Los Angeles | 30,471 | 83.30% | 6,110 | 16.70% | 24,361 | 66.59% | 36,581 | -1.21% |
| Irwindale | Los Angeles | 442 | 63.69% | 252 | 36.31% | 190 | 27.38% | 694 | 3.43% |
| La Canada Flintridge | Los Angeles | 6,799 | 57.19% | 5,090 | 42.81% | 1,709 | 14.37% | 11,889 | -7.68% |
| La Habra Heights | Los Angeles | 1,121 | 37.95% | 1,833 | 62.05% | -712 | -24.10% | 2,954 | -8.24% |
| La Mirada | Los Angeles | 10,372 | 48.45% | 11,034 | 51.55% | -662 | -3.09% | 21,406 | -4.30% |
| La Puente | Los Angeles | 6,607 | 64.06% | 3,706 | 35.94% | 2,901 | 28.13% | 10,313 | -0.15% |
| La Verne | Los Angeles | 7,719 | 45.80% | 9,135 | 54.20% | -1,416 | -8.40% | 16,854 | -6.13% |
| Lakewood | Los Angeles | 21,501 | 56.51% | 16,550 | 43.49% | 4,951 | 13.01% | 38,051 | -3.00% |
| Lancaster | Los Angeles | 28,380 | 53.65% | 24,523 | 46.35% | 3,857 | 7.29% | 52,903 | -1.21% |
| Lawndale | Los Angeles | 5,828 | 64.75% | 3,173 | 35.25% | 2,655 | 29.50% | 9,001 | -1.00% |
| Lomita | Los Angeles | 4,502 | 53.97% | 3,839 | 46.03% | 663 | 7.95% | 8,341 | -3.32% |
| Long Beach | Los Angeles | 115,188 | 68.64% | 52,621 | 31.36% | 62,567 | 37.28% | 167,809 | -2.91% |
| Los Angeles | Los Angeles | 950,027 | 71.57% | 377,377 | 28.43% | 572,650 | 43.14% | 1,327,404 | -0.44% |
| Lynwood | Los Angeles | 10,509 | 70.61% | 4,375 | 29.39% | 6,134 | 41.21% | 14,884 | -0.03% |
| Malibu | Los Angeles | 3,509 | 60.75% | 2,267 | 39.25% | 1,242 | 21.50% | 5,776 | -6.25% |
| Manhattan Beach | Los Angeles | 12,307 | 59.57% | 8,351 | 40.43% | 3,956 | 19.15% | 20,658 | -12.13% |
| Maywood | Los Angeles | 3,576 | 68.36% | 1,655 | 31.64% | 1,921 | 36.72% | 5,231 | -2.08% |
| Monrovia | Los Angeles | 10,572 | 62.29% | 6,401 | 37.71% | 4,171 | 24.57% | 16,973 | -4.82% |
| Montebello | Los Angeles | 12,993 | 66.01% | 6,689 | 33.99% | 6,304 | 32.03% | 19,682 | -0.50% |
| Monterey Park | Los Angeles | 11,244 | 61.78% | 6,956 | 38.22% | 4,288 | 23.56% | 18,200 | -0.74% |
| Norwalk | Los Angeles | 20,737 | 61.49% | 12,985 | 38.51% | 7,752 | 22.99% | 33,722 | -0.71% |
| Palmdale | Los Angeles | 29,025 | 56.74% | 22,125 | 43.26% | 6,900 | 13.49% | 51,150 | -0.51% |
| Palos Verdes Estates | Los Angeles | 4,214 | 49.82% | 4,244 | 50.18% | -30 | -0.35% | 8,458 | -11.60% |
| Paramount | Los Angeles | 8,774 | 68.87% | 3,966 | 31.13% | 4,808 | 37.74% | 12,740 | 1.31% |
| Pasadena | Los Angeles | 48,014 | 75.10% | 15,917 | 24.90% | 32,097 | 50.21% | 63,931 | -2.58% |
| Pico Rivera | Los Angeles | 14,277 | 65.30% | 7,586 | 34.70% | 6,691 | 30.60% | 21,863 | -2.17% |
| Pomona | Los Angeles | 25,106 | 61.78% | 15,534 | 38.22% | 9,572 | 23.55% | 40,640 | -1.29% |
| Rancho Palos Verdes | Los Angeles | 12,215 | 53.12% | 10,779 | 46.88% | 1,436 | 6.25% | 22,994 | -7.56% |
| Redondo Beach | Los Angeles | 23,360 | 64.03% | 13,123 | 35.97% | 10,237 | 28.06% | 36,483 | -5.99% |
| Rolling Hills | Los Angeles | 446 | 38.61% | 709 | 61.39% | -263 | -22.77% | 1,155 | -7.91% |
| Rolling Hills Estates | Los Angeles | 2,422 | 48.77% | 2,544 | 51.23% | -122 | -2.46% | 4,966 | -10.44% |
| Rosemead | Los Angeles | 7,202 | 60.18% | 4,765 | 39.82% | 2,437 | 20.36% | 11,967 | 2.13% |
| San Dimas | Los Angeles | 7,605 | 45.15% | 9,240 | 54.85% | -1,635 | -9.71% | 16,845 | -6.10% |
| San Fernando | Los Angeles | 4,476 | 66.32% | 2,273 | 33.68% | 2,203 | 32.64% | 6,749 | -1.32% |
| San Gabriel | Los Angeles | 7,003 | 59.97% | 4,674 | 40.03% | 2,329 | 19.95% | 11,677 | -1.51% |
| San Marino | Los Angeles | 3,431 | 53.63% | 2,967 | 46.37% | 464 | 7.25% | 6,398 | -8.05% |
| Santa Clarita | Los Angeles | 55,183 | 49.60% | 56,067 | 50.40% | -884 | -0.79% | 111,250 | -3.54% |
| Santa Fe Springs | Los Angeles | 4,224 | 60.09% | 2,805 | 39.91% | 1,419 | 20.19% | 7,029 | -2.47% |
| Santa Monica | Los Angeles | 38,851 | 77.78% | 11,102 | 22.22% | 27,749 | 55.55% | 49,953 | -4.71% |
| Sierra Madre | Los Angeles | 4,433 | 64.65% | 2,424 | 35.35% | 2,009 | 29.30% | 6,857 | -7.19% |
| Signal Hill | Los Angeles | 3,304 | 68.91% | 1,491 | 31.09% | 1,813 | 37.81% | 4,795 | -3.85% |
| South El Monte | Los Angeles | 2,949 | 63.24% | 1,714 | 36.76% | 1,235 | 26.49% | 4,663 | 0.96% |
| South Gate | Los Angeles | 15,946 | 67.43% | 7,701 | 32.57% | 8,245 | 34.87% | 23,647 | -0.53% |
| South Pasadena | Los Angeles | 10,619 | 77.44% | 3,094 | 22.56% | 7,525 | 54.87% | 13,713 | -3.21% |
| Temple City | Los Angeles | 6,652 | 53.04% | 5,889 | 46.96% | 763 | 6.08% | 12,541 | -2.23% |
| Torrance | Los Angeles | 37,546 | 56.34% | 29,101 | 43.66% | 8,445 | 12.67% | 66,647 | -5.25% |
| Vernon | Los Angeles | 49 | 68.06% | 23 | 31.94% | 26 | 36.11% | 72 | 5.34% |
| Walnut | Los Angeles | 6,630 | 54.28% | 5,585 | 45.72% | 1,045 | 8.56% | 12,215 | -3.27% |
| West Covina | Los Angeles | 22,871 | 58.34% | 16,329 | 41.66% | 6,542 | 16.69% | 39,200 | -0.95% |
| West Hollywood | Los Angeles | 16,357 | 81.78% | 3,644 | 18.22% | 12,713 | 63.56% | 20,001 | -0.71% |
| Westlake Village | Los Angeles | 2,718 | 53.23% | 2,388 | 46.77% | 330 | 6.46% | 5,106 | -8.02% |
| Whittier | Los Angeles | 21,153 | 56.82% | 16,077 | 43.18% | 5,076 | 13.63% | 37,230 | -3.27% |
| Unincorporated area | Los Angeles | 212,107 | 62.14% | 129,257 | 37.86% | 82,850 | 24.27% | 341,364 | -1.83% |
| Chowchilla | Madera | 1,518 | 35.93% | 2,707 | 64.07% | -1,189 | -28.14% | 4,225 | 0.49% |
| Madera | Madera | 7,606 | 49.53% | 7,751 | 50.47% | -145 | -0.94% | 15,357 | 0.68% |
| Unincorporated area | Madera | 11,414 | 34.17% | 21,993 | 65.83% | -10,579 | -31.67% | 33,407 | -2.93% |
| Belvedere | Marin | 879 | 67.30% | 427 | 32.70% | 452 | 34.61% | 1,306 | -15.27% |
| Corte Madera | Marin | 4,845 | 81.81% | 1,077 | 18.19% | 3,768 | 63.63% | 5,922 | -4.87% |
| Fairfax | Marin | 4,398 | 87.91% | 605 | 12.09% | 3,793 | 75.81% | 5,003 | -1.57% |
| Larkspur | Marin | 6,171 | 81.11% | 1,437 | 18.89% | 4,734 | 62.22% | 7,608 | -4.70% |
| Mill Valley | Marin | 7,794 | 87.18% | 1,146 | 12.82% | 6,648 | 74.36% | 8,940 | -4.45% |
| Novato | Marin | 20,181 | 72.91% | 7,497 | 27.09% | 12,684 | 45.83% | 27,678 | -3.84% |
| Ross | Marin | 993 | 71.23% | 401 | 28.77% | 592 | 42.47% | 1,394 | -16.45% |
| San Anselmo | Marin | 6,946 | 86.13% | 1,119 | 13.87% | 5,827 | 72.25% | 8,065 | -3.75% |
| San Rafael | Marin | 21,418 | 80.94% | 5,045 | 19.06% | 16,373 | 61.87% | 26,463 | -2.66% |
| Sausalito | Marin | 3,812 | 81.26% | 879 | 18.74% | 2,933 | 62.52% | 4,691 | -6.44% |
| Tiburon | Marin | 4,087 | 73.97% | 1,438 | 26.03% | 2,649 | 47.95% | 5,525 | -9.86% |
| Unincorporated area | Marin | 31,318 | 80.85% | 7,419 | 19.15% | 23,899 | 61.70% | 38,737 | -3.81% |
| Unincorporated area | Mariposa | 3,582 | 38.40% | 5,747 | 61.60% | -2,165 | -23.21% | 9,329 | -2.14% |
| Fort Bragg | Mendocino | 2,032 | 71.20% | 822 | 28.80% | 1,210 | 42.40% | 2,854 | -0.15% |
| Point Arena | Mendocino | 165 | 84.62% | 30 | 15.38% | 135 | 69.23% | 195 | 9.82% |
| Ukiah | Mendocino | 3,740 | 62.51% | 2,243 | 37.49% | 1,497 | 25.02% | 5,983 | 0.06% |
| Willits | Mendocino | 1,152 | 60.16% | 763 | 39.84% | 389 | 20.31% | 1,915 | -0.28% |
| Unincorporated area | Mendocino | 17,017 | 62.24% | 10,324 | 37.76% | 6,693 | 24.48% | 27,341 | -1.33% |
| Atwater | Merced | 4,355 | 45.35% | 5,248 | 54.65% | -893 | -9.30% | 9,603 | -0.18% |
| Dos Palos | Merced | 750 | 46.79% | 853 | 53.21% | -103 | -6.43% | 1,603 | 1.11% |
| Gustine | Merced | 849 | 45.23% | 1,028 | 54.77% | -179 | -9.54% | 1,877 | 2.00% |
| Livingston | Merced | 2,301 | 57.14% | 1,726 | 42.86% | 575 | 14.28% | 4,027 | 7.63% |
| Los Banos | Merced | 7,216 | 55.03% | 5,898 | 44.97% | 1,318 | 10.05% | 13,114 | 3.24% |
| Merced | Merced | 14,381 | 54.94% | 11,793 | 45.06% | 2,588 | 9.89% | 26,174 | -0.40% |
| Unincorporated area | Merced | 10,542 | 38.59% | 16,774 | 61.41% | -6,232 | -22.81% | 27,316 | 0.28% |
| Alturas | Modoc | 296 | 27.28% | 789 | 72.72% | -493 | -45.44% | 1,085 | -2.62% |
| Unincorporated area | Modoc | 682 | 23.98% | 2,162 | 76.02% | -1,480 | -52.04% | 2,844 | -3.83% |
| Mammoth Lakes | Mono | 1,915 | 65.05% | 1,029 | 34.95% | 886 | 30.10% | 2,944 | -5.67% |
| Unincorporated area | Mono | 1,469 | 49.92% | 1,474 | 50.08% | -5 | -0.17% | 2,943 | -4.83% |
| Carmel-by-the-Sea | Monterey | 1,457 | 65.63% | 763 | 34.37% | 694 | 31.26% | 2,220 | -8.33% |
| Del Rey Oaks | Monterey | 649 | 64.71% | 354 | 35.29% | 295 | 29.41% | 1,003 | -4.75% |
| Gonzales | Monterey | 1,356 | 63.96% | 764 | 36.04% | 592 | 27.92% | 2,120 | 2.01% |
| Greenfield | Monterey | 2,211 | 67.53% | 1,063 | 32.47% | 1,148 | 35.06% | 3,274 | 3.87% |
| King City | Monterey | 1,215 | 53.88% | 1,040 | 46.12% | 175 | 7.76% | 2,255 | -0.68% |
| Marina | Monterey | 6,292 | 67.91% | 2,973 | 32.09% | 3,319 | 35.82% | 9,265 | -0.77% |
| Monterey | Monterey | 9,049 | 71.01% | 3,695 | 28.99% | 5,354 | 42.01% | 12,744 | -3.42% |
| Pacific Grove | Monterey | 6,610 | 76.39% | 2,043 | 23.61% | 4,567 | 52.78% | 8,653 | -2.81% |
| Salinas | Monterey | 25,743 | 63.90% | 14,544 | 36.10% | 11,199 | 27.80% | 40,287 | 0.52% |
| Sand City | Monterey | 109 | 64.88% | 59 | 35.12% | 50 | 29.76% | 168 | -2.61% |
| Seaside | Monterey | 7,093 | 70.33% | 2,993 | 29.67% | 4,100 | 40.65% | 10,086 | -0.14% |
| Soledad | Monterey | 2,972 | 64.32% | 1,649 | 35.68% | 1,323 | 28.63% | 4,621 | 3.37% |
| Unincorporated area | Monterey | 27,546 | 57.97% | 19,973 | 42.03% | 7,573 | 15.94% | 47,519 | -4.61% |
| American Canyon | Napa | 6,328 | 67.66% | 3,024 | 32.34% | 3,304 | 35.33% | 9,352 | 2.32% |
| Calistoga | Napa | 1,491 | 73.27% | 544 | 26.73% | 947 | 46.54% | 2,035 | -2.65% |
| Napa | Napa | 24,574 | 67.16% | 12,017 | 32.84% | 12,557 | 34.32% | 36,591 | -3.54% |
| St. Helena | Napa | 1,998 | 70.18% | 849 | 29.82% | 1,149 | 40.36% | 2,847 | -8.14% |
| Yountville | Napa | 978 | 69.26% | 434 | 30.74% | 544 | 38.53% | 1,412 | -5.19% |
| Unincorporated area | Napa | 6,876 | 57.33% | 5,118 | 42.67% | 1,758 | 14.66% | 11,994 | -5.77% |
| Grass Valley | Nevada | 3,895 | 58.13% | 2,806 | 41.87% | 1,089 | 16.25% | 6,701 | -1.73% |
| Nevada City | Nevada | 1,538 | 75.76% | 492 | 24.24% | 1,046 | 51.53% | 2,030 | 1.31% |
| Truckee | Nevada | 6,875 | 73.19% | 2,518 | 26.81% | 4,357 | 46.39% | 9,393 | -5.11% |
| Unincorporated area | Nevada | 21,055 | 48.71% | 22,171 | 51.29% | -1,116 | -2.58% | 43,226 | -3.60% |
| Aliso Viejo | Orange | 13,034 | 51.96% | 12,053 | 48.04% | 981 | 3.91% | 25,087 | -4.70% |
| Anaheim | Orange | 60,678 | 53.81% | 52,080 | 46.19% | 8,598 | 7.63% | 112,758 | -1.45% |
| Brea | Orange | 10,626 | 46.21% | 12,367 | 53.79% | -1,741 | -7.57% | 22,993 | -6.28% |
| Buena Park | Orange | 15,365 | 51.32% | 14,574 | 48.68% | 791 | 2.64% | 29,939 | -2.37% |
| Costa Mesa | Orange | 24,117 | 50.49% | 23,645 | 49.51% | 472 | 0.99% | 47,762 | -4.23% |
| Cypress | Orange | 11,619 | 49.17% | 12,009 | 50.83% | -390 | -1.65% | 23,628 | -4.67% |
| Dana Point | Orange | 8,569 | 43.68% | 11,047 | 56.32% | -2,478 | -12.63% | 19,616 | -6.05% |
| Fountain Valley | Orange | 13,129 | 45.72% | 15,587 | 54.28% | -2,458 | -8.56% | 28,716 | -3.46% |
| Fullerton | Orange | 29,927 | 52.82% | 26,728 | 47.18% | 3,199 | 5.65% | 56,655 | -4.83% |
| Garden Grove | Orange | 30,286 | 49.83% | 30,487 | 50.17% | -201 | -0.33% | 60,773 | 2.28% |
| Huntington Beach | Orange | 46,323 | 43.38% | 60,470 | 56.62% | -14,147 | -13.25% | 106,793 | -4.43% |
| Irvine | Orange | 69,074 | 59.31% | 47,393 | 40.69% | 21,681 | 18.62% | 116,467 | -2.83% |
| La Habra | Orange | 12,003 | 50.50% | 11,765 | 49.50% | 238 | 1.00% | 23,768 | -3.23% |
| La Palma | Orange | 3,698 | 51.16% | 3,531 | 48.84% | 167 | 2.31% | 7,229 | -5.46% |
| Laguna Beach | Orange | 8,773 | 59.33% | 6,013 | 40.67% | 2,760 | 18.67% | 14,786 | -6.68% |
| Laguna Hills | Orange | 7,486 | 47.84% | 8,161 | 52.16% | -675 | -4.31% | 15,647 | -4.33% |
| Laguna Niguel | Orange | 17,310 | 47.46% | 19,164 | 52.54% | -1,854 | -5.08% | 36,474 | -5.10% |
| Laguna Woods | Orange | 7,239 | 55.80% | 5,734 | 44.20% | 1,505 | 11.60% | 12,973 | -4.36% |
| Lake Forest | Orange | 20,920 | 49.58% | 21,272 | 50.42% | -352 | -0.83% | 42,192 | -4.47% |
| Los Alamitos | Orange | 2,710 | 47.18% | 3,034 | 52.82% | -324 | -5.64% | 5,744 | -6.39% |
| Mission Viejo | Orange | 24,477 | 46.66% | 27,986 | 53.34% | -3,509 | -6.69% | 52,463 | -5.68% |
| Newport Beach | Orange | 18,713 | 37.83% | 30,753 | 62.17% | -12,040 | -24.34% | 49,466 | -7.45% |
| Orange | Orange | 29,483 | 49.31% | 30,314 | 50.69% | -831 | -1.39% | 59,797 | -4.38% |
| Placentia | Orange | 11,852 | 47.73% | 12,977 | 52.27% | -1,125 | -4.53% | 24,829 | -4.82% |
| Rancho Santa Margarita | Orange | 11,270 | 44.85% | 13,861 | 55.15% | -2,591 | -10.31% | 25,131 | -6.09% |
| San Clemente | Orange | 14,904 | 39.77% | 22,574 | 60.23% | -7,670 | -20.47% | 37,478 | -6.76% |
| San Juan Capistrano | Orange | 7,926 | 43.56% | 10,270 | 56.44% | -2,344 | -12.88% | 18,196 | -4.95% |
| Santa Ana | Orange | 49,693 | 62.87% | 29,343 | 37.13% | 20,350 | 25.75% | 79,036 | 2.01% |
| Seal Beach | Orange | 8,032 | 49.56% | 8,173 | 50.44% | -141 | -0.87% | 16,205 | -6.20% |
| Stanton | Orange | 6,107 | 54.28% | 5,143 | 45.72% | 964 | 8.57% | 11,250 | 2.97% |
| Tustin | Orange | 17,295 | 56.08% | 13,543 | 43.92% | 3,752 | 12.17% | 30,838 | -3.40% |
| Villa Park | Orange | 1,291 | 33.27% | 2,589 | 66.73% | -1,298 | -33.45% | 3,880 | -7.22% |
| Westminster | Orange | 16,728 | 46.48% | 19,262 | 53.52% | -2,534 | -7.04% | 35,990 | 1.93% |
| Yorba Linda | Orange | 14,139 | 36.03% | 25,102 | 63.97% | -10,963 | -27.94% | 39,241 | -6.65% |
| Unincorporated area | Orange | 30,086 | 42.95% | 39,963 | 57.05% | -9,877 | -14.10% | 70,049 | -6.57% |
| Auburn | Placer | 3,943 | 48.53% | 4,182 | 51.47% | -239 | -2.94% | 8,125 | -5.48% |
| Colfax | Placer | 344 | 38.18% | 557 | 61.82% | -213 | -23.64% | 901 | -4.66% |
| Lincoln | Placer | 13,031 | 42.00% | 17,996 | 58.00% | -4,965 | -16.00% | 31,027 | -5.42% |
| Loomis | Placer | 1,240 | 30.38% | 2,841 | 69.62% | -1,601 | -39.23% | 4,081 | -5.76% |
| Rocklin | Placer | 16,298 | 43.64% | 21,047 | 56.36% | -4,749 | -12.72% | 37,345 | -6.14% |
| Roseville | Placer | 36,783 | 46.31% | 42,640 | 53.69% | -5,857 | -7.37% | 79,423 | -4.71% |
| Unincorporated area | Placer | 26,559 | 39.48% | 40,718 | 60.52% | -14,159 | -21.05% | 67,277 | -5.76% |
| Portola | Plumas | 340 | 41.01% | 489 | 58.99% | -149 | -17.97% | 829 | 0.20% |
| Unincorporated area | Plumas | 3,581 | 39.24% | 5,545 | 60.76% | -1,964 | -21.52% | 9,126 | -4.70% |
| Banning | Riverside | 5,750 | 46.87% | 6,518 | 53.13% | -768 | -6.26% | 12,268 | -2.83% |
| Beaumont | Riverside | 10,796 | 44.37% | 13,534 | 55.63% | -2,738 | -11.25% | 24,330 | -2.58% |
| Blythe | Riverside | 1,361 | 40.27% | 2,019 | 59.73% | -658 | -19.47% | 3,380 | 0.27% |
| Calimesa | Riverside | 1,920 | 33.42% | 3,825 | 66.58% | -1,905 | -33.16% | 5,745 | -1.82% |
| Canyon Lake | Riverside | 1,375 | 20.37% | 5,376 | 79.63% | -4,001 | -59.27% | 6,751 | -3.31% |
| Cathedral City | Riverside | 12,811 | 67.66% | 6,123 | 32.34% | 6,688 | 35.32% | 18,934 | -1.66% |
| Coachella | Riverside | 5,724 | 64.22% | 3,189 | 35.78% | 2,535 | 28.44% | 8,913 | 1.60% |
| Corona | Riverside | 28,170 | 45.67% | 33,505 | 54.33% | -5,335 | -8.65% | 61,675 | -2.58% |
| Desert Hot Springs | Riverside | 4,708 | 57.08% | 3,540 | 42.92% | 1,168 | 14.16% | 8,248 | -1.99% |
| Eastvale | Riverside | 12,569 | 46.98% | 14,187 | 53.02% | -1,618 | -6.05% | 26,756 | -1.74% |
| Hemet | Riverside | 14,020 | 47.01% | 15,806 | 52.99% | -1,786 | -5.99% | 29,826 | -0.87% |
| Indian Wells | Riverside | 1,137 | 39.76% | 1,723 | 60.24% | -586 | -20.49% | 2,860 | -7.83% |
| Indio | Riverside | 16,290 | 53.51% | 14,155 | 46.49% | 2,135 | 7.01% | 30,445 | -1.67% |
| Jurupa Valley | Riverside | 15,606 | 49.35% | 16,020 | 50.65% | -414 | -1.31% | 31,626 | 0.19% |
| La Quinta | Riverside | 9,365 | 47.70% | 10,270 | 52.30% | -905 | -4.61% | 19,635 | -5.01% |
| Lake Elsinore | Riverside | 11,590 | 44.87% | 14,239 | 55.13% | -2,649 | -10.26% | 25,829 | -1.72% |
| Menifee | Riverside | 22,009 | 42.02% | 30,372 | 57.98% | -8,363 | -15.97% | 52,381 | -3.12% |
| Moreno Valley | Riverside | 35,668 | 59.45% | 24,333 | 40.55% | 11,335 | 18.89% | 60,001 | 0.77% |
| Murrieta | Riverside | 19,577 | 39.36% | 30,160 | 60.64% | -10,583 | -21.28% | 49,737 | -3.32% |
| Norco | Riverside | 3,019 | 26.56% | 8,349 | 73.44% | -5,330 | -46.89% | 11,368 | -3.45% |
| Palm Desert | Riverside | 13,730 | 52.19% | 12,580 | 47.81% | 1,150 | 4.37% | 26,310 | -4.81% |
| Palm Springs | Riverside | 19,352 | 79.95% | 4,854 | 20.05% | 14,498 | 59.89% | 24,206 | -1.43% |
| Perris | Riverside | 11,576 | 60.43% | 7,579 | 39.57% | 3,997 | 20.87% | 19,155 | 2.10% |
| Rancho Mirage | Riverside | 7,119 | 61.11% | 4,530 | 38.89% | 2,589 | 22.23% | 11,649 | -4.58% |
| Riverside | Riverside | 55,830 | 52.69% | 50,121 | 47.31% | 5,709 | 5.39% | 105,951 | -1.84% |
| San Jacinto | Riverside | 7,348 | 48.33% | 7,856 | 51.67% | -508 | -3.34% | 15,204 | 0.22% |
| Temecula | Riverside | 21,972 | 42.56% | 29,658 | 57.44% | -7,686 | -14.89% | 51,630 | -4.55% |
| Wildomar | Riverside | 5,633 | 35.81% | 10,098 | 64.19% | -4,465 | -28.38% | 15,731 | -2.70% |
| Unincorporated area | Riverside | 67,156 | 42.81% | 89,722 | 57.19% | -22,566 | -14.38% | 156,878 | -2.43% |
| Citrus Heights | Sacramento | 17,147 | 45.32% | 20,688 | 54.68% | -3,541 | -9.36% | 37,835 | -3.28% |
| Elk Grove | Sacramento | 46,619 | 58.56% | 32,995 | 41.44% | 13,624 | 17.11% | 79,614 | -1.31% |
| Folsom | Sacramento | 21,436 | 49.74% | 21,659 | 50.26% | -223 | -0.52% | 43,095 | -6.92% |
| Galt | Sacramento | 4,277 | 39.48% | 6,555 | 60.52% | -2,278 | -21.03% | 10,832 | -3.21% |
| Isleton | Sacramento | 131 | 48.88% | 137 | 51.12% | -6 | -2.24% | 268 | -6.54% |
| Rancho Cordova | Sacramento | 17,279 | 54.69% | 14,314 | 45.31% | 2,965 | 9.38% | 31,593 | -1.88% |
| Sacramento | Sacramento | 142,435 | 72.48% | 54,073 | 27.52% | 88,362 | 44.97% | 196,508 | -0.60% |
| Unincorporated area | Sacramento | 125,941 | 52.59% | 113,533 | 47.41% | 12,408 | 5.18% | 239,474 | -2.94% |
| Hollister | San Benito | 9,448 | 60.34% | 6,211 | 39.66% | 3,237 | 20.67% | 15,659 | -0.47% |
| San Juan Bautista | San Benito | 682 | 64.89% | 369 | 35.11% | 313 | 29.78% | 1,051 | -2.12% |
| Unincorporated area | San Benito | 4,861 | 47.14% | 5,451 | 52.86% | -590 | -5.72% | 10,312 | -3.24% |
| Adelanto | San Bernardino | 4,339 | 56.04% | 3,403 | 43.96% | 936 | 12.09% | 7,742 | 1.01% |
| Apple Valley | San Bernardino | 10,776 | 35.01% | 20,005 | 64.99% | -9,229 | -29.98% | 30,781 | -1.55% |
| Barstow | San Bernardino | 2,528 | 42.54% | 3,415 | 57.46% | -887 | -14.93% | 5,943 | -1.08% |
| Big Bear Lake | San Bernardino | 797 | 38.10% | 1,295 | 61.90% | -498 | -23.80% | 2,092 | -7.15% |
| Chino | San Bernardino | 16,363 | 47.29% | 18,239 | 52.71% | -1,876 | -5.42% | 34,602 | -2.89% |
| Chino Hills | San Bernardino | 15,570 | 45.33% | 18,781 | 54.67% | -3,211 | -9.35% | 34,351 | -4.89% |
| Colton | San Bernardino | 8,601 | 59.65% | 5,818 | 40.35% | 2,783 | 19.30% | 14,419 | 1.57% |
| Fontana | San Bernardino | 38,672 | 56.44% | 29,851 | 43.56% | 8,821 | 12.87% | 68,523 | 0.50% |
| Grand Terrace | San Bernardino | 2,609 | 47.29% | 2,908 | 52.71% | -299 | -5.42% | 5,517 | -1.19% |
| Hesperia | San Bernardino | 12,127 | 38.35% | 19,496 | 61.65% | -7,369 | -23.30% | 31,623 | 0.02% |
| Highland | San Bernardino | 8,992 | 48.17% | 9,674 | 51.83% | -682 | -3.65% | 18,666 | -1.40% |
| Loma Linda | San Bernardino | 4,957 | 54.52% | 4,135 | 45.48% | 822 | 9.04% | 9,092 | -2.29% |
| Montclair | San Bernardino | 6,171 | 58.65% | 4,350 | 41.35% | 1,821 | 17.31% | 10,521 | -0.55% |
| Needles | San Bernardino | 562 | 39.72% | 853 | 60.28% | -291 | -20.57% | 1,415 | -0.50% |
| Ontario | San Bernardino | 30,883 | 55.09% | 25,176 | 44.91% | 5,707 | 10.18% | 56,059 | -1.18% |
| Rancho Cucamonga | San Bernardino | 35,711 | 46.69% | 40,771 | 53.31% | -5,060 | -6.62% | 76,482 | -2.82% |
| Redlands | San Bernardino | 17,244 | 50.91% | 16,627 | 49.09% | 617 | 1.82% | 33,871 | -3.99% |
| Rialto | San Bernardino | 18,131 | 60.00% | 12,089 | 40.00% | 6,042 | 19.99% | 30,220 | -0.31% |
| San Bernardino | San Bernardino | 29,380 | 56.85% | 22,297 | 43.15% | 7,083 | 13.71% | 51,677 | -0.46% |
| Twentynine Palms | San Bernardino | 2,338 | 45.06% | 2,851 | 54.94% | -513 | -9.89% | 5,189 | -0.55% |
| Upland | San Bernardino | 16,871 | 48.23% | 18,108 | 51.77% | -1,237 | -3.54% | 34,979 | -4.06% |
| Victorville | San Bernardino | 18,985 | 51.69% | 17,741 | 48.31% | 1,244 | 3.39% | 36,726 | 0.57% |
| Yucaipa | San Bernardino | 8,040 | 30.94% | 17,945 | 69.06% | -9,905 | -38.12% | 25,985 | -3.44% |
| Yucca Valley | San Bernardino | 3,482 | 38.81% | 5,490 | 61.19% | -2,008 | -22.38% | 8,972 | -2.08% |
| Unincorporated area | San Bernardino | 41,538 | 39.82% | 62,773 | 60.18% | -21,235 | -20.36% | 104,311 | -2.03% |
| Carlsbad | San Diego | 37,311 | 54.77% | 30,807 | 45.23% | 6,504 | 9.55% | 68,118 | -7.43% |
| Chula Vista | San Diego | 65,524 | 57.73% | 47,983 | 42.27% | 17,541 | 15.45% | 113,507 | -1.43% |
| Coronado | San Diego | 4,451 | 48.11% | 4,800 | 51.89% | -349 | -3.77% | 9,251 | -10.82% |
| Del Mar | San Diego | 1,640 | 59.66% | 1,109 | 40.34% | 531 | 19.32% | 2,749 | -7.99% |
| El Cajon | San Diego | 15,159 | 43.90% | 19,371 | 56.10% | -4,212 | -12.20% | 34,530 | 1.21% |
| Encinitas | San Diego | 23,297 | 62.05% | 14,249 | 37.95% | 9,048 | 24.10% | 37,546 | -7.88% |
| Escondido | San Diego | 28,729 | 52.55% | 25,936 | 47.45% | 2,793 | 5.11% | 54,665 | -2.24% |
| Imperial Beach | San Diego | 4,625 | 51.79% | 4,305 | 48.21% | 320 | 3.58% | 8,930 | -1.45% |
| La Mesa | San Diego | 17,964 | 61.91% | 11,050 | 38.09% | 6,914 | 23.83% | 29,014 | -3.21% |
| Lemon Grove | San Diego | 6,385 | 59.64% | 4,321 | 40.36% | 2,064 | 19.28% | 10,706 | -2.10% |
| National City | San Diego | 9,801 | 61.70% | 6,083 | 38.30% | 3,718 | 23.41% | 15,884 | 5.04% |
| Oceanside | San Diego | 43,964 | 54.19% | 37,171 | 45.81% | 6,793 | 8.37% | 81,135 | -2.95% |
| Poway | San Diego | 12,920 | 48.82% | 13,546 | 51.18% | -626 | -2.37% | 26,466 | -7.36% |
| San Diego | San Diego | 388,355 | 65.19% | 207,328 | 34.81% | 181,027 | 30.39% | 595,683 | -3.24% |
| San Marcos | San Diego | 22,426 | 54.70% | 18,570 | 45.30% | 3,856 | 9.41% | 40,996 | -3.67% |
| Santee | San Diego | 12,267 | 41.52% | 17,279 | 58.48% | -5,012 | -16.96% | 29,546 | -4.62% |
| Solana Beach | San Diego | 4,863 | 60.98% | 3,112 | 39.02% | 1,751 | 21.96% | 7,975 | -8.41% |
| Vista | San Diego | 20,442 | 54.41% | 17,127 | 45.59% | 3,315 | 8.82% | 37,569 | -1.74% |
| Unincorporated area | San Diego | 97,682 | 40.93% | 140,982 | 59.07% | -43,300 | -18.14% | 238,664 | -3.98% |
| San Francisco | San Francisco | 310,932 | 82.40% | 66,421 | 17.60% | 244,511 | 64.80% | 377,353 | 0.00% |
| Escalon | San Joaquin | 1,025 | 29.56% | 2,442 | 70.44% | -1,417 | -40.87% | 3,467 | -2.77% |
| Lathrop | San Joaquin | 6,659 | 57.31% | 4,961 | 42.69% | 1,698 | 14.61% | 11,620 | 5.03% |
| Lodi | San Joaquin | 9,976 | 38.94% | 15,641 | 61.06% | -5,665 | -22.11% | 25,617 | -3.15% |
| Manteca | San Joaquin | 15,731 | 47.47% | 17,405 | 52.53% | -1,674 | -5.05% | 33,136 | 0.56% |
| Ripon | San Joaquin | 2,370 | 28.97% | 5,810 | 71.03% | -3,440 | -42.05% | 8,180 | -3.21% |
| Stockton | San Joaquin | 51,311 | 59.07% | 35,555 | 40.93% | 15,756 | 18.14% | 86,866 | 1.48% |
| Tracy | San Joaquin | 18,207 | 55.33% | 14,698 | 44.67% | 3,509 | 10.66% | 32,905 | 0.55% |
| Mountain House | San Joaquin | 4,389 | 58.96% | 3,055 | 41.04% | 1,334 | 17.92% | 7,444 | 3.08% |
| Unincorporated area | San Joaquin | 17,537 | 37.29% | 29,497 | 62.71% | -11,960 | -25.43% | 47,034 | -1.31% |
| Arroyo Grande | San Luis Obispo | 5,507 | 51.73% | 5,139 | 48.27% | 368 | 3.46% | 10,646 | -5.71% |
| Atascadero | San Luis Obispo | 7,744 | 47.93% | 8,413 | 52.07% | -669 | -4.14% | 16,157 | -4.66% |
| El Paso de Robles | San Luis Obispo | 6,482 | 45.78% | 7,676 | 54.22% | -1,194 | -8.43% | 14,158 | -3.86% |
| Grover Beach | San Luis Obispo | 3,236 | 53.02% | 2,867 | 46.98% | 369 | 6.05% | 6,103 | -4.47% |
| Morro Bay | San Luis Obispo | 4,032 | 60.95% | 2,583 | 39.05% | 1,449 | 21.90% | 6,615 | -5.10% |
| Pismo Beach | San Luis Obispo | 2,632 | 50.38% | 2,592 | 49.62% | 40 | 0.77% | 5,224 | -6.71% |
| San Luis Obispo | San Luis Obispo | 16,991 | 72.61% | 6,408 | 27.39% | 10,583 | 45.23% | 23,399 | -3.77% |
| Unincorporated area | San Luis Obispo | 30,901 | 48.44% | 32,891 | 51.56% | -1,990 | -3.12% | 63,792 | -4.79% |
| Atherton | San Mateo | 2,505 | 64.28% | 1,392 | 35.72% | 1,113 | 28.56% | 3,897 | -15.13% |
| Belmont | San Mateo | 10,262 | 75.65% | 3,303 | 24.35% | 6,959 | 51.30% | 13,565 | -4.29% |
| Brisbane | San Mateo | 1,782 | 77.41% | 520 | 22.59% | 1,262 | 54.82% | 2,302 | -1.43% |
| Burlingame | San Mateo | 10,976 | 73.32% | 3,993 | 26.68% | 6,983 | 46.65% | 14,969 | -4.50% |
| Colma | San Mateo | 409 | 72.52% | 155 | 27.48% | 254 | 45.04% | 564 | -0.62% |
| Daly City | San Mateo | 23,490 | 72.38% | 8,963 | 27.62% | 14,527 | 44.76% | 32,453 | 2.70% |
| East Palo Alto | San Mateo | 5,112 | 80.33% | 1,252 | 19.67% | 3,860 | 60.65% | 6,364 | 2.95% |
| Foster City | San Mateo | 9,857 | 71.20% | 3,988 | 28.80% | 5,869 | 42.39% | 13,845 | -4.97% |
| Half Moon Bay | San Mateo | 4,676 | 73.59% | 1,678 | 26.41% | 2,998 | 47.18% | 6,354 | -3.60% |
| Hillsborough | San Mateo | 3,818 | 60.25% | 2,519 | 39.75% | 1,299 | 20.50% | 6,337 | -13.97% |
| Menlo Park | San Mateo | 12,938 | 79.89% | 3,257 | 20.11% | 9,681 | 59.78% | 16,195 | -5.58% |
| Millbrae | San Mateo | 6,501 | 63.90% | 3,673 | 36.10% | 2,828 | 27.80% | 10,174 | -2.61% |
| Pacifica | San Mateo | 14,996 | 73.80% | 5,324 | 26.20% | 9,672 | 47.60% | 20,320 | -1.28% |
| Portola Valley | San Mateo | 2,287 | 75.03% | 761 | 24.97% | 1,526 | 50.07% | 3,048 | -11.66% |
| Redwood City | San Mateo | 25,825 | 76.69% | 7,851 | 23.31% | 17,974 | 53.37% | 33,676 | -2.97% |
| San Bruno | San Mateo | 12,417 | 70.03% | 5,315 | 29.97% | 7,102 | 40.05% | 17,732 | -0.03% |
| San Carlos | San Mateo | 13,275 | 76.45% | 4,090 | 23.55% | 9,185 | 52.89% | 17,365 | -6.08% |
| San Mateo | San Mateo | 32,570 | 74.43% | 11,190 | 25.57% | 21,380 | 48.86% | 43,760 | -3.48% |
| South San Francisco | San Mateo | 18,093 | 72.20% | 6,967 | 27.80% | 11,126 | 44.40% | 25,060 | 0.94% |
| Woodside | San Mateo | 2,336 | 67.49% | 1,125 | 32.51% | 1,211 | 34.99% | 3,461 | -12.55% |
| Unincorporated area | San Mateo | 23,061 | 76.31% | 7,158 | 23.69% | 15,903 | 52.63% | 30,219 | -3.81% |
| Buellton | Santa Barbara | 1,431 | 51.74% | 1,335 | 48.26% | 96 | 3.47% | 2,766 | -5.83% |
| Carpinteria | Santa Barbara | 4,405 | 68.41% | 2,034 | 31.59% | 2,371 | 36.82% | 6,439 | -5.26% |
| Goleta | Santa Barbara | 11,060 | 69.10% | 4,946 | 30.90% | 6,114 | 38.20% | 16,006 | -4.13% |
| Guadalupe | Santa Barbara | 1,202 | 57.05% | 905 | 42.95% | 297 | 14.10% | 2,107 | 0.30% |
| Lompoc | Santa Barbara | 6,921 | 52.27% | 6,320 | 47.73% | 601 | 4.54% | 13,241 | -3.18% |
| Santa Barbara | Santa Barbara | 32,453 | 75.87% | 10,322 | 24.13% | 22,131 | 51.74% | 42,775 | -4.37% |
| Santa Maria | Santa Barbara | 13,000 | 50.52% | 12,730 | 49.48% | 270 | 1.05% | 25,730 | -0.49% |
| Solvang | Santa Barbara | 1,665 | 51.47% | 1,570 | 48.53% | 95 | 2.94% | 3,235 | -6.70% |
| Unincorporated area | Santa Barbara | 38,472 | 56.22% | 29,964 | 43.78% | 8,508 | 12.43% | 68,436 | -5.82% |
| Campbell | Santa Clara | 13,696 | 70.69% | 5,679 | 29.31% | 8,017 | 41.38% | 19,375 | -3.61% |
| Cupertino | Santa Clara | 16,909 | 69.41% | 7,453 | 30.59% | 9,456 | 38.81% | 24,362 | -5.39% |
| Gilroy | Santa Clara | 14,256 | 62.45% | 8,573 | 37.55% | 5,683 | 24.89% | 22,829 | -1.74% |
| Los Altos | Santa Clara | 13,428 | 75.29% | 4,406 | 24.71% | 9,022 | 50.59% | 17,834 | -8.23% |
| Los Altos Hills | Santa Clara | 3,425 | 67.73% | 1,632 | 32.27% | 1,793 | 35.46% | 5,057 | -10.52% |
| Los Gatos | Santa Clara | 12,302 | 68.39% | 5,686 | 31.61% | 6,616 | 36.78% | 17,988 | -7.74% |
| Milpitas | Santa Clara | 15,949 | 64.45% | 8,799 | 35.55% | 7,150 | 28.89% | 24,748 | 2.30% |
| Monte Sereno | Santa Clara | 1,362 | 61.94% | 837 | 38.06% | 525 | 23.87% | 2,199 | -10.16% |
| Morgan Hill | Santa Clara | 13,267 | 61.17% | 8,423 | 38.83% | 4,844 | 22.33% | 21,690 | -4.19% |
| Mountain View | Santa Clara | 24,871 | 79.29% | 6,498 | 20.71% | 18,373 | 58.57% | 31,369 | -3.63% |
| Palo Alto | Santa Clara | 26,452 | 79.28% | 6,914 | 20.72% | 19,538 | 58.56% | 33,366 | -5.84% |
| San Jose | Santa Clara | 242,137 | 67.72% | 115,416 | 32.28% | 126,721 | 35.44% | 357,553 | -0.43% |
| Santa Clara | Santa Clara | 29,037 | 70.33% | 12,249 | 29.67% | 16,788 | 40.66% | 41,286 | -0.82% |
| Saratoga | Santa Clara | 11,449 | 65.89% | 5,926 | 34.11% | 5,523 | 31.79% | 17,375 | -9.41% |
| Sunnyvale | Santa Clara | 37,778 | 73.17% | 13,849 | 26.83% | 23,929 | 46.35% | 51,627 | -2.09% |
| Unincorporated area | Santa Clara | 22,467 | 64.70% | 12,257 | 35.30% | 10,210 | 29.40% | 34,724 | -3.18% |
| Capitola | Santa Cruz | 4,183 | 76.00% | 1,321 | 24.00% | 2,862 | 52.00% | 5,504 | -2.94% |
| Santa Cruz | Santa Cruz | 25,772 | 85.91% | 4,227 | 14.09% | 21,545 | 71.82% | 29,999 | -0.46% |
| Scotts Valley | Santa Cruz | 4,928 | 68.70% | 2,245 | 31.30% | 2,683 | 37.40% | 7,173 | -5.50% |
| Watsonville | Santa Cruz | 10,086 | 73.29% | 3,676 | 26.71% | 6,410 | 46.58% | 13,762 | 2.71% |
| Unincorporated area | Santa Cruz | 53,662 | 73.58% | 19,268 | 26.42% | 34,394 | 47.16% | 72,930 | -2.97% |
| Anderson | Shasta | 1,203 | 28.21% | 3,062 | 71.79% | -1,859 | -43.59% | 4,265 | -3.29% |
| Redding | Shasta | 14,667 | 33.60% | 28,982 | 66.40% | -14,315 | -32.80% | 43,649 | -4.15% |
| Shasta Lake | Shasta | 1,462 | 31.38% | 3,197 | 68.62% | -1,735 | -37.24% | 4,659 | -2.83% |
| Unincorporated area | Shasta | 8,664 | 24.88% | 26,161 | 75.12% | -17,497 | -50.24% | 34,825 | -4.15% |
| Loyalton | Sierra | 93 | 27.93% | 240 | 72.07% | -147 | -44.14% | 333 | -2.16% |
| Unincorporated area | Sierra | 524 | 37.59% | 870 | 62.41% | -346 | -24.82% | 1,394 | -4.91% |
| Dorris | Siskiyou | 70 | 29.05% | 171 | 70.95% | -101 | -41.91% | 241 | -0.04% |
| Dunsmuir | Siskiyou | 413 | 59.00% | 287 | 41.00% | 126 | 18.00% | 700 | -3.63% |
| Etna | Siskiyou | 112 | 33.63% | 221 | 66.37% | -109 | -32.73% | 333 | -4.12% |
| Fort Jones | Siskiyou | 94 | 31.86% | 201 | 68.14% | -107 | -36.27% | 295 | -5.81% |
| Montague | Siskiyou | 156 | 25.87% | 447 | 74.13% | -291 | -48.26% | 603 | -4.75% |
| Mt. Shasta | Siskiyou | 1,073 | 58.96% | 747 | 41.04% | 326 | 17.91% | 1,820 | -2.15% |
| Tulelake | Siskiyou | 48 | 34.53% | 91 | 65.47% | -43 | -30.94% | 139 | -5.76% |
| Weed | Siskiyou | 378 | 44.95% | 463 | 55.05% | -85 | -10.11% | 841 | -7.45% |
| Yreka | Siskiyou | 1,141 | 35.59% | 2,065 | 64.41% | -924 | -28.82% | 3,206 | -3.85% |
| Unincorporated area | Siskiyou | 4,602 | 35.77% | 8,265 | 64.23% | -3,663 | -28.47% | 12,867 | -3.86% |
| Benicia | Solano | 10,717 | 66.56% | 5,385 | 33.44% | 5,332 | 33.11% | 16,102 | -4.69% |
| Dixon | Solano | 4,418 | 46.89% | 5,005 | 53.11% | -587 | -6.23% | 9,423 | -1.34% |
| Fairfield | Solano | 28,256 | 63.26% | 16,410 | 36.74% | 11,846 | 26.52% | 44,666 | -0.05% |
| Rio Vista | Solano | 3,871 | 59.26% | 2,661 | 40.74% | 1,210 | 18.52% | 6,532 | -3.27% |
| Suisun City | Solano | 7,251 | 66.19% | 3,703 | 33.81% | 3,548 | 32.39% | 10,954 | 0.93% |
| Vacaville | Solano | 21,773 | 49.85% | 21,900 | 50.15% | -127 | -0.29% | 43,673 | -2.41% |
| Vallejo | Solano | 33,083 | 73.45% | 11,959 | 26.55% | 21,124 | 46.90% | 45,042 | 1.23% |
| Unincorporated area | Solano | 3,835 | 41.61% | 5,381 | 58.39% | -1,546 | -16.78% | 9,216 | -3.32% |
| Cloverdale | Sonoma | 2,610 | 64.41% | 1,442 | 35.59% | 1,168 | 28.83% | 4,052 | -1.65% |
| Cotati | Sonoma | 2,759 | 71.46% | 1,102 | 28.54% | 1,657 | 42.92% | 3,861 | -2.40% |
| Healdsburg | Sonoma | 4,663 | 76.51% | 1,432 | 23.49% | 3,231 | 53.01% | 6,095 | -4.52% |
| Petaluma | Sonoma | 24,551 | 73.53% | 8,839 | 26.47% | 15,712 | 47.06% | 33,390 | -2.71% |
| Rohnert Park | Sonoma | 13,979 | 67.88% | 6,616 | 32.12% | 7,363 | 35.75% | 20,595 | -0.83% |
| Santa Rosa | Sonoma | 59,258 | 73.64% | 21,210 | 26.36% | 38,048 | 47.28% | 80,468 | -1.70% |
| Sebastopol | Sonoma | 3,905 | 84.76% | 702 | 15.24% | 3,203 | 69.52% | 4,607 | -0.34% |
| Sonoma | Sonoma | 4,835 | 74.57% | 1,649 | 25.43% | 3,186 | 49.14% | 6,484 | -4.86% |
| Windsor | Sonoma | 8,731 | 64.32% | 4,844 | 35.68% | 3,887 | 28.63% | 13,575 | -2.35% |
| Unincorporated area | Sonoma | 51,186 | 71.03% | 20,876 | 28.97% | 30,310 | 42.06% | 72,062 | -2.79% |
| Ceres | Stanislaus | 7,462 | 51.79% | 6,947 | 48.21% | 515 | 3.57% | 14,409 | 4.86% |
| Hughson | Stanislaus | 1,111 | 33.48% | 2,207 | 66.52% | -1,096 | -33.03% | 3,318 | -0.31% |
| Modesto | Stanislaus | 37,577 | 49.32% | 38,619 | 50.68% | -1,042 | -1.37% | 76,196 | 0.05% |
| Newman | Stanislaus | 1,859 | 50.08% | 1,853 | 49.92% | 6 | 0.16% | 3,712 | 3.17% |
| Oakdale | Stanislaus | 3,269 | 31.79% | 7,014 | 68.21% | -3,745 | -36.42% | 10,283 | -2.21% |
| Patterson | Stanislaus | 4,705 | 60.02% | 3,134 | 39.98% | 1,571 | 20.04% | 7,839 | 4.31% |
| Riverbank | Stanislaus | 4,056 | 44.33% | 5,094 | 55.67% | -1,038 | -11.34% | 9,150 | -0.75% |
| Turlock | Stanislaus | 11,432 | 42.35% | 15,561 | 57.65% | -4,129 | -15.30% | 26,993 | 0.19% |
| Waterford | Stanislaus | 1,077 | 34.24% | 2,068 | 65.76% | -991 | -31.51% | 3,145 | -0.22% |
| Unincorporated area | Stanislaus | 13,492 | 36.04% | 23,947 | 63.96% | -10,455 | -27.93% | 37,439 | -0.45% |
| Live Oak | Sutter | 1,310 | 42.15% | 1,798 | 57.85% | -488 | -15.70% | 3,108 | 1.63% |
| Yuba City | Sutter | 9,363 | 37.01% | 15,935 | 62.99% | -6,572 | -25.98% | 25,298 | 0.34% |
| Unincorporated area | Sutter | 2,311 | 23.81% | 7,396 | 76.19% | -5,085 | -52.38% | 9,707 | -2.86% |
| Corning | Tehama | 712 | 37.18% | 1,203 | 62.82% | -491 | -25.64% | 1,915 | -3.37% |
| Red Bluff | Tehama | 1,650 | 33.80% | 3,231 | 66.20% | -1,581 | -32.39% | 4,881 | -2.30% |
| Tehama | Tehama | 69 | 36.51% | 120 | 63.49% | -51 | -26.98% | 189 | -1.60% |
| Unincorporated area | Tehama | 4,667 | 24.90% | 14,078 | 75.10% | -9,411 | -50.21% | 18,745 | -3.11% |
| Unincorporated area | Trinity | 2,413 | 43.39% | 3,148 | 56.61% | -735 | -13.22% | 5,561 | -3.83% |
| Dinuba | Tulare | 2,694 | 47.64% | 2,961 | 52.36% | -267 | -4.72% | 5,655 | 0.86% |
| Exeter | Tulare | 1,075 | 28.96% | 2,637 | 71.04% | -1,562 | -42.08% | 3,712 | -4.68% |
| Farmersville | Tulare | 1,059 | 53.59% | 917 | 46.41% | 142 | 7.19% | 1,976 | 2.27% |
| Lindsay | Tulare | 1,096 | 50.69% | 1,066 | 49.31% | 30 | 1.39% | 2,162 | -8.54% |
| Porterville | Tulare | 6,175 | 42.07% | 8,503 | 57.93% | -2,328 | -15.86% | 14,678 | -1.98% |
| Tulare | Tulare | 7,440 | 37.04% | 12,647 | 62.96% | -5,207 | -25.92% | 20,087 | -2.78% |
| Visalia | Tulare | 20,088 | 38.78% | 31,711 | 61.22% | -11,623 | -22.44% | 51,799 | -2.71% |
| Woodlake | Tulare | 874 | 54.56% | 728 | 45.44% | 146 | 9.11% | 1,602 | -2.48% |
| Unincorporated area | Tulare | 11,471 | 34.00% | 22,269 | 66.00% | -10,798 | -32.00% | 33,740 | -2.50% |
| Sonora | Tuolumne | 1,073 | 48.07% | 1,159 | 51.93% | -86 | -3.85% | 2,232 | -1.76% |
| Unincorporated area | Tuolumne | 9,406 | 36.71% | 16,213 | 63.29% | -6,807 | -26.57% | 25,619 | -2.95% |
| Camarillo | Ventura | 19,614 | 51.15% | 18,735 | 48.85% | 879 | 2.29% | 38,349 | -6.12% |
| Fillmore | Ventura | 3,438 | 54.66% | 2,852 | 45.34% | 586 | 9.32% | 6,290 | -0.59% |
| Moorpark | Ventura | 9,483 | 51.62% | 8,889 | 48.38% | 594 | 3.23% | 18,372 | -5.79% |
| Ojai | Ventura | 3,036 | 69.30% | 1,345 | 30.70% | 1,691 | 38.60% | 4,381 | -4.93% |
| Oxnard | Ventura | 38,807 | 65.71% | 20,255 | 34.29% | 18,552 | 31.41% | 59,062 | -0.70% |
| Port Hueneme | Ventura | 4,489 | 61.98% | 2,754 | 38.02% | 1,735 | 23.95% | 7,243 | -2.16% |
| San Buenaventura | Ventura | 34,293 | 60.93% | 21,990 | 39.07% | 12,303 | 21.86% | 56,283 | -3.96% |
| Santa Paula | Ventura | 6,093 | 60.20% | 4,029 | 39.80% | 2,064 | 20.39% | 10,122 | -1.33% |
| Simi Valley | Ventura | 29,606 | 45.71% | 35,168 | 54.29% | -5,562 | -8.59% | 64,774 | -4.44% |
| Thousand Oaks | Ventura | 37,599 | 53.61% | 32,533 | 46.39% | 5,066 | 7.22% | 70,132 | -5.97% |
| Unincorporated area | Ventura | 24,923 | 54.14% | 21,110 | 45.86% | 3,813 | 8.28% | 46,033 | -4.43% |
| Davis | Yolo | 25,853 | 84.33% | 4,803 | 15.67% | 21,050 | 68.67% | 30,656 | -2.24% |
| West Sacramento | Yolo | 13,129 | 60.88% | 8,437 | 39.12% | 4,692 | 21.76% | 21,566 | -0.90% |
| Winters | Yolo | 1,923 | 54.74% | 1,590 | 45.26% | 333 | 9.48% | 3,513 | -3.00% |
| Woodland | Yolo | 14,450 | 58.27% | 10,349 | 41.73% | 4,101 | 16.54% | 24,799 | -1.07% |
| Unincorporated area | Yolo | 5,729 | 55.58% | 4,579 | 44.42% | 1,150 | 11.16% | 10,308 | -3.34% |
| Marysville | Yuba | 1,446 | 37.20% | 2,441 | 62.80% | -995 | -25.60% | 3,887 | -1.37% |
| Wheatland | Yuba | 483 | 29.22% | 1,170 | 70.78% | -687 | -41.56% | 1,653 | -3.84% |
| Unincorporated area | Yuba | 8,572 | 36.21% | 15,100 | 63.79% | -6,528 | -27.58% | 23,672 | -2.31% |
| Totals | | 9,036,252 | 58.87% | 6,312,594 | 41.13% | 2,723,658 | 17.75% | 15,348,846 | -2.39% |

Cities & unincorporated areas that voted for Steve Garvey and Kamala Harris

- Placerville (El Dorado)
- Hidden Hills (Los Angeles)
- La Mirada (Los Angeles)
- Palos Verdes Estates (Los Angeles)
- Rolling Hills Estates (Los Angeles)
- Santa Clarita (Los Angeles)
- Unincorporated area (Mono)
- Unincorporated area (Nevada)
- Cypress (Orange)
- Laguna Hills (Orange)
- Laguna Niguel (Orange)
- Lake Forest (Orange)
- Los Alamitos (Orange)
- Orange (Orange)
- Placentia (Orange)
- Seal Beach (Orange)
- Auburn (Placer)
- La Quinta (Riverside)
- Folsom (Sacramento)
- Isleton (Sacramento)
- Upland (San Bernardino)
- Coronado (San Diego)
- Poway (San Diego)
- Atascadero (San Luis Obispo)
- Unincorporated Area (San Luis Obispo)
- Vacaville (Solano)

Cities & unincorporated areas that voted for Adam Schiff and Donald Trump

- Avenal (Kings)
- Corcoran (Kings)
- Ceres (Stanislaus)
- Newman (Stanislaus)

== See also ==
- 2024 United States Senate elections
- 2024 California elections
- List of United States Senate elections in California

== Notes ==
Partisan clients
