= Chuck Henry =

American journalist (born 1946)

- Born: Charles Robert Henry; January 1, 1946 (age 80); Los Angeles, California, U.S.
- Occupation: Journalist
- Years active: 1966–2022
- Television: KHVH-TV (1966–1971); KENI-TV (1967–1968); KABC-TV (1971–1978, 1982–1993); WMAQ-TV (1978–1982); Now You See It (1989); KNBC (January 3, 1994–December 22, 2022)
- Spouse: Kay
- Children: 4

Charles Robert Henry (born January 1, 1946) is a retired American journalist, who worked in the Greater Los Angeles media market for 48 years. He worked for nearly 29 years at KNBC, where he was a co-anchor of the 5, 6, and 11 p.m. newscasts, and he worked for 19 years at KABC-TV, where he served as reporter, anchor, director, and producer (1971–1978, 1982–1993).

== Early life ==
Born in Los Angeles, Henry was raised in Covina, California, as one of five children. Henry's parents were the founders of a home for orphaned children, with 60 of them regularly part of the Henry family's lives. He graduated from Charter Oak High School.

== Career ==
=== News ===
Henry began his career in broadcasting at KHVH-TV (now KITV) in Honolulu as news anchor-reporter from 1966 to 1971 with a short interval in Anchorage, Alaska, as a news anchor-reporter for KENI-TV (now KTUU-TV) from 1967 to 1968. Shortly before going to Alaska, Henry was drafted into the U.S. Army and was stationed up in Alaska concurrently during his time at KENI-TV without being sent over to Vietnam. He then began his first stint at KABC-TV in October 1971, beginning as a morning anchor before moving to weekends. By the spring of 1974, Henry was promoted to anchor of the 5 p.m. Eyewitness News, working alongside Christine Lund and Jerry Dunphy.

Henry then served as anchor-reporter at WMAQ-TV, the NBC-owned television station in Chicago from August 1978 to March 1982. His WMAQ co-anchors included Carol Marin, Jerry Taft and Linda Yu. Then in April 1982, Henry rejoined KABC-TV as reporter, weekend anchor (alongside Joanne Ishimine) and would later work among other capacities, including film reviews. He left KABC-TV in May 1993.

Henry joined the KNBC staff in January 1994 (just several days after his 48th birthday), replacing John Beard as anchor of the 4 p.m. news and also as a reporter. In 1997, Henry replaced Jess Marlow on the 6 p.m. newscast and then added the 5 and 11 p.m. newscasts after Paul Moyer retired in 2009. Henry would anchor all three newscasts until his own retirement on December 22, 2022.

Henry gained national attention in October 2003, when he and his cameraman, Kristopher Li, were nearly killed in the field while shooting a report about California forest fires in the San Gabriel Mountains near Sylmar. Although the news media were told to leave by the fire department, a sudden change in wind direction prevented Henry and his crew from doing so. The engine of the KNBC news van failed to turn over; it was subsequently engulfed and lost to the fire and both Henry and Li had to be rescued by the LAFD. Henry and Li were interviewed by KNBC reporter Kyung Lah shortly thereafter where Henry tearfully recollected what they went through in the fire.

=== Other work ===
While in Hawaii, Henry did an uncredited cameo on Hawaii Five-O in the second season episode of Three Dead Cows at Makapuu (Part #1). Henry played an Army Lieutenant who attempted to get Steve McGarrett (Jack Lord) to return three dead cows to the Army.

During his second stint at KABC, Henry, from 1984 to 1991 became best known as host and, in 1988, added producer/director to the popular travel magazine program, Eye on L.A. (formerly known as Eyewitness Los Angeles). He has visited every continent in the world as host of these programs, which he received several Emmys. Henry had also hosted the weekday afternoon program L.A. Today alongside Ann Martin.

Henry also began hosting national programs including Eye on Hollywood, the national version of Eye on L.A. (1983-1986, ABC late-nights); The Love Report, a magazine show about celebrity romance (1984, ABC daytime); Preview: The Best of the New, produced by Robin Leach (1990, syndication); and First Look, another weekly magazine (1991-1992, syndication).

In 1975, Henry hosted an attempted revival of the game show Beat the Odds. In 1989, Henry hosted a short-lived revival of the classic Goodson-Todman game show Now You See It on CBS. He was also one of six people to audition to host its replacement, the daytime version of Wheel of Fortune (which had moved from NBC to CBS at the time); however, Bob Goen was hired instead. Before it was in development, in the early 90s, Henry was one of two hosts who did a runthrough for the unsold Mark Goodson pilot Body Talk while the other was Vicki Lawrence (known as Vicki Lawrence-Schultz at the time) who would eventually be hired later on.

Henry is also well known for hosting (and executive-producing) Travel Café, a travel program in which he flies all around the world highlighting food and travel. Travel Café, a two-time Emmy Award winner, was the first local (Los Angeles) TV series produced in HDTV and was also seen on the Travel Channel along with the 1990's program Eye on Travel (also hosted by Henry).

== Personal life ==
Henry is a member of the Church of Jesus Christ of Latter-day Saints. He had spent several years as his congregation's Sunday school teacher.

In 1964, Henry married his high school sweetheart, Kay, with whom he has four children.
