= Ann Martin (journalist) =

American journalist

- Education: University of Washington
- Occupation: News Anchor (Retired)
- Employer(s): Seattle: KIRO-TV (1972-1976); Los Angeles: KABC-TV (1976-1994); KCBS-TV (1994-2008); KCAL-TV (2005-2008)

Ann Martin (born Martha Marmont) is a former journalist and a news anchor for the CBS owned-and-operated KCBS-TV and KCAL-TV television stations in Los Angeles, California.

Martin was born in Portland, Oregon and raised in Everett, Washington, where her father, Paul Marmont, worked at the former Everett Western Gear facility. She attended the nearby University of Washington, where she majored in communications and earned a Bachelor of Arts in 1972.

Shortly after graduation, Martin began her broadcasting career at KIRO-TV as a weather-caster for the station's morning newscasts. She became the first woman in the Seattle market to solo anchor a newscast when she was promoted to weekend co-anchor.

After reporting and anchoring for KIRO for several years, Martin moved to Los Angeles in April 1976 to work for KABC-TV as a reporter. She began co-anchoring the Saturday editions of Eyewitness News. In the fall of 1980, KABC expanded its news to three hours on weeknights, and Martin began co-anchoring the 5 p.m. hour with Paul Moyer; the on-air partnership would last for almost 12 years until Moyer's return to rival KNBC-TV in 1992, in which Harold Greene replaced Moyer.

During her years at KABC, Martin also had brief hosting stints on several of the station's local programs, including A.M. Los Angeles, L.A. Today (alongside Chuck Henry) and 3-3-0. She also was a substitute host on ABC's Good Morning America.

In the spring of 1994, Martin moved to KCBS-TV initially to co-anchor the 5 and 11 p.m. editions of what was then-called Channel 2 Action News alongside longtime San Diego anchor Michael Tuck; the reported $1.7-million-a-year deal, like her former KABC colleague Moyer's deal with KNBC two years earlier, was highly publicized by the local press. In later years, Martin would be reunited with her other former KABC co-workers: sports anchor Jim Hill was already at KCBS after his five-year stint at KABC; Dr. George Fischbeck joined in late 1994; Jerry Dunphy, who briefly returned to KCBS-TV in 1995; Harold Greene, who succeeded Moyer as Martin's co-anchor, would join in early 2001; Laura Diaz joined in 2002 and Johnny Mountain arrived in 2005. While at KCBS, Martin also co-hosted the CBS network special Beyond Belief - Amazing True Stories! with Pat O'Brien in 1995. From 1999 to 2001, Martin also co-anchored the female-oriented newscast Women 2 Women alongside Catherine Anaya, Pamela Wright and former KNBC newscaster Kelly Lange.

On April 1, 2008, she was informed that her contract would not be renewed. Media reports speculated that her contract expired on June 1, 2008. By this time, Martin and Greene were anchoring the 4 p.m. news on KCAL and the 6 p.m. news on KCBS. CBS, through a press spokesperson, stated that both had chosen to retire, but neither Martin, nor Greene made any official comment.

Martin has earned three local Emmy Awards and two Golden Mike awards for her reporting throughout her career.
