= Desiree Horton =

American helicopter pilot

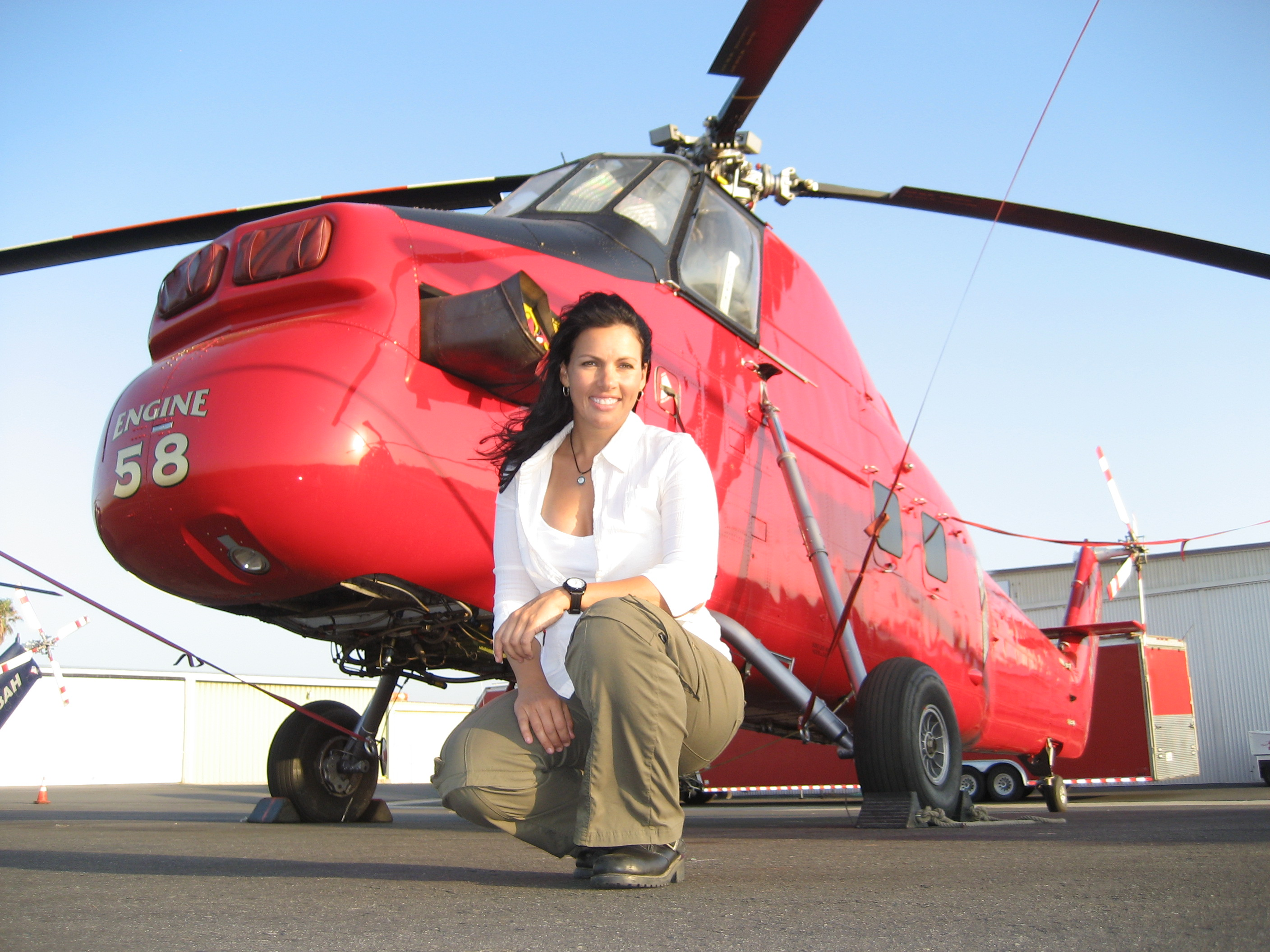
- Born: North Hollywood, California
- Other names: "Chopper Chick" and "Heli-Barbie"
- Occupations: helicopter pilot, television news reporter, firefighter
- Employer(s): Air Resources Helicopters, Inc.; Angel City Air; Aris/Heli-Flite; California Department of Forestry and Fire Protection; Corona, California Police Department; Helinet Aviation; High Performance Helicopters; KCBS 2; KTLA 5; KCAL 9; KTTV 11; Midwest Helicopter Airways; Platinum Helicopters; truTV; United States Forest Service
- Known for: Los Angeles' only female helicopter pilot/reporter
- Website: http://copterchick.blogspot.com

Desiree Horton nicknamed "Chopper Chick," is a helicopter pilot and television personality based in Los Angeles, California.

Desiree Horton is an American helicopter pilot and aviation professional known for her work in aerial firefighting, rescue operations, and utility aviation. She has accumulated over 10,000 flight hours across a wide range of missions, including law enforcement support, heavy-lift construction, and wildland fire suppression.

Horton began her aviation career in Southern California, gaining experience in charter operations, aerial news reporting, and utility flying. She later worked on specialized missions including organ transport, seismic survey support, and airlift construction.

Horton funded her own advanced flight training, including vertical reference (long-line) operations and mountain flying, in order to qualify for federal firefighting contract work. From 2005 to 2013, she worked on U.S. Forest Service (USFS) fire contracts, supporting aerial firefighting operations in California and the western United States, where she was among the first women to operate on exclusive-use contracts in Region 5.

From 2013 to 2019, Horton served as a full-time helicopter pilot with Cal Fire, where she became one of the first female pilots to serve in that role. During her tenure, she conducted aerial firefighting and rescue missions throughout California, operating in high-risk and demanding environments.

Horton served as a helicopter pilot with the California Department of Forestry and Fire Protection (CAL FIRE), where she was among a select group of full-time pilots and gained national recognition for helping break barriers for women in aerial firefighting.

Horton has worked extensively in public safety aviation, including helicopter-based firefighting, rescue, and aerial support operations across California and the western United States. She has conducted missions in complex operational environments, including day and night operations, mountain terrain, and high-risk fire conditions.

She served as a helicopter pilot with the California Department of Forestry and Fire Protection (CAL FIRE), where she was among a limited number of full-time pilots and was recognized in national media for helping break barriers for women in aerial firefighting."Cal Fire's 1st full-time female fire pilot says job is 'dream job'". NBC News. May 8, 2015.

In addition to her firefighting work, Horton has supported a wide range of aviation operations, including utility and external-load (long-line) work, aerial firefighting contracts, and rescue missions requiring precision flying in demanding conditions.

Horton has also contributed to aviation safety and operational development, including work related to flight risk assessment and pilot fatigue mitigation in public safety aviation.

She is recognized for her experience in complex, high-altitude and night operations, and for her contributions to advancing safety practices in helicopter emergency response environments.

Horton continues to work in public safety aviation for a fire department, conducting helicopter-based fire suppression and rescue missions in complex operational environments, including day and night operations throughout Southern California, with experience in all-risk mission profiles.

She is one of the few female helicopter pilots/on-camera reporters in Los Angeles television history.

== Career ==
Horton began to fly at age 19, shortly after graduation from North Hollywood High School in North Hollywood, California, a suburb of Los Angeles. She worked two jobs (at a car dealership and a pharmacy) for two and a half years to pay for her training. She explained, "I could only afford to take lessons once a week or once every other week as I made the money to pay for them." She also washed local pilot/reporter Scott Reiff's helicopter in exchange for flying hours. At one point, Horton was a stuntwoman, riding horses for films.

She earned her pilot's license at 21, and since then has flown traffic watch, tours, frost control, charter, wildland firefighting, police operations, aerial construction, bank runs, medical and organ transport. She has also ferried helicopters across the U. S.

From 2001 to 2005, Horton flew and reported for KABC 7 in Los Angeles. She was with KTLA 5 in Los Angeles from April 2005 to October 2005, flying their helicopter and reporting traffic and breaking news for the KTLA Morning News.

While flying for KNBC 4, Horton had to report the deaths of four of her fellow United States Forest Service firefighters (a fifth would later succumb to his injuries) in the arson-caused Esperanza Fire. The next day, Horton herself would be fighting that fire from the air.

Horton now divides her time among several jobs: In the summer, she fights fires by helicopter for the California Department of Forestry and Fire Protection and the U. S. Forest Service. Only about twenty women are certified by the USFS to do this. Horton derives great satisfaction from fighting fires because she's saving people's property and maybe even their lives. She says it also provides an additional enjoyment that comes from making full use of a chopper's unique capabilities. She was featured in the August 2007 issue of Wildland Firefighter magazine, in an article detailing her flying career.

In the winter, she reports breaking news in the evening and at night for KCBS 2 and KCAL 9 in Los Angeles. She has also flown a helicopter for the city of Corona, California Police Department.

Horton, who is on the board of directors of the Professional Helicopter Pilots Association (PHPA), has over 7,400 hours (August 2008) in rotorcraft and says her dream is to work for the Los Angeles County Fire Department.

She has been featured in articles in Private Pilot, Air Beat, Pilot Magazine, Pacific Flyer, and the LA 411 directory. With regard to Horton, LA 411 said: "A young woman with a breezy nature, youthful looks and bright smile, it's often assumed [on a movie set] that she can't possibly be there to fly an aircraft. In fact, she's been yelled at for simply going near the helicopter."

Horton says, "I've even been told sometimes when they see me walking toward the helicopter, 'Hey girl get away from the helicopter!'"

The May 1, 2009 edition of the Smithsonian Institution's publication Air & Space/Smithsonian identifies Horton as "a specialized breed of aviator [that] has evolved, one adapted to the medium of live television" since the invention of the Telecopter.

She has also appeared as a model in both the Harley-Davidson motorcycle catalog and the Harley-Davidson clothing catalog. Horton and her helicopter have appeared on camera in several films including American Icarus (2002), Showtime (2002), and One Six Right (2005). Horton has also worked on a number of motion pictures where the helicopter served as an aerial camera platform. She is one of just a handful of female SAG/AFTRA chopper pilots.

In 2008, Horton was set to star in her own television series Sky Racers on truTV (formerly Court TV). The show, which never left the development stage, was to put viewers inside the cockpit with Horton covering breaking news in the Los Angeles area. In August 2008, Horton was flying and filming scenes in Maui, Hawaii for another truTV show, Maui Chopper, to debut on December 10, 2008. In March 2010, Horton represented Heli-Barbie in a commercial made for Mattel, Inc.'s Barbie doll. In November 2011, she was studying to get her license as an emergency medical technician (EMT).

As of 2012, Desiree splits her time between flying news in Los Angeles for KCAL/KCBS as a pilot/reporter and working her second season on an exclusive use fire contract as a highly trained rappel pilot in Region 6 in Oregon flying a Bell 205A1++.

Horton has her own company, Horizon Helicopters, Inc., in Studio City, California, for production jobs.

== Popularity with viewers ==
When KTLA replaced Horton late in 2005, popular media-tracking weblog Innocent Bystander said it subsequently received so many "hits" from people searching the Internet for Horton that it had to post an online warning saying it might be forced to shut down for a few days. This had never happened before. Due to KTLA's distribution via satellite as a "superstation," viewers from as far as Canada wrote to complain that Horton was no longer on the Morning News.

Horton used to maintain a blog, The Adventures of Chopper Chick!, so her fans can keep up with her activities and ask her questions. She set up the blog after learning there were so many people asking about her on the Internet. "I didn't realize how many fans I had and how many people cared [about me] until I was gone [from KTLA]," she said.

== Personal life ==
Horton was born and raised in North Hollywood, California. She is very close to her mom. Her KTLA bio stated: "One of the most cherished people in her life is her mother."

== Sources ==
https://www.firefighternation.com/firerescue/meet-cal-fires-first-female-helicopter-pilot/

- Fineman, Ron (2005-05-06). "I Couldn't Help But Notice". On the Record.
- Lyons, Amy. "Fighting Fire". North Valley Community News].
- Ross, Paul M. Jr. (December 2006). "Price Valley Rappellers Fight Fire Across the Country". Wildland Firefighter. Archived from the original on 2007-09-28.
