= Micah Ohlman =

American journalist

- Born: May 4, 1972 (age 54); Torrance, California, U.S.
- Education: William S. Hart High School; University of Nevada, Las Vegas
- Occupation: News Anchor
- Years active: 1998–present
- Television: KULR-TV (1998–2000); WTVJ-TV (2000–2002); KABC-TV (2002–2009); KTLA (2009–present)
- Children: 3
- Relatives: Paul Moyer (uncle)

Micah D. Ohlman (born May 4, 1972) is an American journalist. He has co-anchored the weekday editions of the KTLA News @ 5pm, 6pm, 6:30pm, 7pm, 10pm and 11pm. A Los Angeles native, Ohlman was born in Torrance, graduated from William S. Hart High School in Newhall, and earned a degree in communication studies from The University of Nevada, Las Vegas. While attending UNLV, Ohlman earned a spot on the nationally ranked 1992–93 UNLV Runnin' Rebels basketball team as a walk-on. He is married and has three children.

== Early career ==
The nephew of veteran Los Angeles television anchor Paul Moyer, Ohlman began his career as a weekday evening co-anchor for NBC affiliate KULR-TV in Billings, Montana from 1998 to 2000. He went on to anchor and report at WTVJ-TV, the NBC-owned television station in Miami, Florida. Two years later, Ohlman returned as a co-anchor for ABC's west coast flagship, KABC-TV in Los Angeles. In April, 2009, Ohlman left KABC-TV. Ohlman signed on with KTLA in September 2009 as the stations new anchor alongside Victoria Recaño, taking over the station's KTLA News at 6 and 6:30, and signature broadcast, the KTLA News at 10. Emmett Farr, who had held the main anchor post following the death of Hal Fishman, was moved to the KTLA Morning News, clearing the way for Ohlman.

== Later career ==
Ohlman has anchored extensive live coverage of several of the major stories Southern California has seen over the past several years. He was also live on the air in the anchor chair as the magnitude 5.5 Chino earthquake struck in July 2008. In 2005, Ohlman traveled to Vietnam, following two Los Angeles residents who were among several Vietnamese-American adoptees returning to their homeland for the first time since the fall of Saigon in 1975. His three-part series on the emotional homecoming earned Ohlman an Emmy nomination. He also reported live from the scene outside Washington, D.C. for several weeks during the "Beltway Snipers" killing spree in October 2002. Micah also reported live from the nation's capital during the state funeral of former President Ronald Reagan and provided extensive coverage of the collapse of the nation's economy in 2008.
