= Johnny Mountain =

American television weathercaster

Johnny Mountain is a retired weathercaster for both KABC-TV and KCBS-TV in Los Angeles, California. He has been described as "one of the most recognizable faces -- and names -- in local TV news."

== Early career ==
Mountain began his television career in the 1960s at WTVK (now WVLT-TV) in Knoxville, Tennessee. At WTVK, Mountain did weather for WTVK's newscasts and was also their local Bozo the Clown. In 1977, Mountain joined WLS-TV in Chicago, Illinois. While at WLS-TV, Mountain encountered Dr. George Fischbeck of KABC-TV in Los Angeles. Fischbeck, who was appearing as a guest meteorologist on WLS-TV, persuaded Mountain, who was disenchanted with changes that had occurred at WLS-TV to join KABC-TV.

== Career in Los Angeles ==
In 1978, Mountain joined KABC-TV to become a weekend meteorologist. A few years later, he made the transition to weekday afternoons. Fischbeck would later step down and Mountain would add weeknights to his schedule. In the early 1990s, Mountain was shifted to weekday mornings from 5:00-7:00 a.m. and afternoon at 5:00 p.m. when his partner Dallas Raines took Mountain's 6:00 and 11:00 p.m. spots. Mountain also guest hosted on KABC-TV's local programs A.M. Los Angeles and 330. He also was a contributor on the ABC late night program Eye on Hollywood. Mountain was notable for his off-the-wall humor; on one occasion, in response to a viewer question about grunion fish, he held up a specimen during his weathercast, explaining "This is a front view of a grunion; this is a side view; and this..." (placing a small paper bag with "eye holes" over the fish) "...is the Unknown Grunion."

In January 2005, Mountain decided to leave KABC and gave an on-air farewell. However in May 2005, he joined KCBS-TV to reunite with his former KABC partners Ann Martin (1994), Harold Greene (2001), Laura Diaz (2002) and sportcaster Jim Hill (who first joined in 1976, then rejoined in 1992).

Mountain retired in March 2010 as part of a "restructuring" of KCBS news operations.
