= WLXT-TV =

Television station in Aurora, Illinois (1969–1970)

- Aurora, Illinois; United States
- Channels: Analog: 60 (UHF)

Programming
- Affiliations: Independent

Ownership
- Owner: South Kane-Kendall Broadcasting Corporation

History
- First air date: May 18, 1969
- Last air date: July 17, 1970; (1 year, 60 days)

Technical information
- Licensing authority: FCC
- ERP: 208 kW
- HAAT: 134 m (440 ft)
- Transmitter coordinates: 41°47′54″N 88°08′59″W

Links
- Public license information: Public file; LMS

WLXT-TV (channel 60) was an independent television station in Aurora, Illinois, United States, which broadcast from 1969 to 1970. The station was owned by the South Kane-Kendall Broadcasting Corporation. WLXT ceased operating in July 1970; channel 60 would not return to air in Chicago for another 12 years.

== History ==
In late 1966, the South Kane-Kendall Broadcasting Corporation was one of two applicants for channel 60 at Aurora; it won the station in 1968, initially proposing an educational-commercial hybrid schedule featuring credit courses from Waubonsee Community College. Investors in South Kane-Kendall included Roy Raymond, owner of a plastics company, and Ray Sherwood, general manager of Aurora radio station WMRO-FM. The station also won the favor of city councilmembers, who voted down a proposed cable system for Aurora largely because they feared it would harm the planned local station. WLXT-TV began telecasting May 18, 1969, from a former dance studio in Aurora and a transmitter in nearby Naperville. The cost of building the station was less than expected because South Kane-Kendall was able to get deals on used equipment, including a transmitter from WCET in Cincinnati.

WLXT focused on local programming for Aurora and its suburban coverage area. Channel 60 proposed to the Du Page County Board of Supervisors that it telecast its meetings over WLXT. In a market with multiple independent stations already, its program offerings included movies, a program featuring a cartoonist, children's shows, and other local fare. It also broadcast coverage of fast-pitch softball games.

Briefly in December and January, WLXT cut back its programming to a bare minimum of live news and a movie while work was carried out to add new color equipment at a cost of over $150,000; by this time, South Kane-Kendall had hired Simpson Productions to manage channel 60. After the upgrade was complete, WLXT broadcast from 3:30 to 11 p.m. on weekdays and 5 to 11 p.m. on weekends.

WLXT suspended operations on July 17, 1970. The closure was abrupt and announced to employees when they arrived to work to find a sign on the door. Shortly thereafter, in March 1971, ads appeared in Broadcasting magazine advertising the station as for sale by trustee. The station did not sell, and its equipment was advertised for sale the next year.

Despite its short time on air, several station alumni went on to more notable positions. After the station closed, news director Christine Lund, who had taken the position two years out of college, went to work for KGO-TV in San Francisco on her way to becoming a well-known anchor for KABC-TV in Los Angeles. Craig Roberts, who joined the station's news staff, was asked to do sports when the sports director quit; he went on to be the sports director of KPRC-TV in Houston. A pair of brothers—Tom Skilling, later of WGN-TV, and Jeffrey Skilling, who would later become the CEO of Enron Corporation—worked at WLXT-TV while in high school; Tom did weather, while Jeff helped in the control room.
