= Harold Greene (journalist) =

American journalist (1943–2026)

- Born: December 1, 1943
- Died: November 3, 2026 (aged 82)
- Occupation: News anchor
- Years active: 1970–2008
- Employer(s): KCBS-TV Ch. 2 KABC-TV Ch. 7

Harold Greene (December 1, 1943 – November 3, 2026) was an American journalist and news anchor at KCAL 9 News and CBS 2 News in Los Angeles. Before joining the CBS duopoly, he had a television news career, mostly in Southern California.

Greene began his career in 1970 as a reporter and producer for KABC-TV in Los Angeles. Later in 1973, Greene was hired to help launch the news operations for KCST-TV (now KNSD) which at the time became the new ABC affiliate for San Diego. After serving one year as anchor/news director at Channel 39, he moved over to rival station, then-NBC affiliate KGTV, where his co-anchoring The News with Jack White and his coverage of the Chicano Movement helped the station briefly overtake rival KFMB in the ratings. Years later, Jack White became a consultant for the film Anchorman: The Legend of Ron Burgundy resulting in the filmmakers finding some old pictures of Greene in White's scrapbooks and the look of Ron Burgundy was born.

In 1977, Greene left San Diego for a brief stint at CBS affiliate KPIX-TV in San Francisco, paired with co-anchor Dave McElhatton, a popular local radio personality who himself was in his first year with the station. After a year in the Bay Area, Greene returned to Los Angeles and rejoined KABC-TV as co-anchor of the 5:00 p.m. Eyewitness News with Jerry Dunphy. However, after two years of co-anchoring the 5:00pm newscast with Dunphy, he was fired; KABC management subsequently brought in Ann Martin and special correspondent Paul Moyer (formerly of KNBC-TV at the time) to anchor the newscast.

He returned to San Diego and his old evening anchor slot at KGTV (which had switched its affiliation from NBC to ABC in 1977), but in 1982 KABC rehired him as a reporter and weekend anchor alongside Joanne Ishimine. His third tenure at KABC became more successful, which included serving as host/celebrity interviewer of locally produced programs such as Hollywood Close-Up and A.M. Los Angeles for the station. He would earn one of ten Golden Mike Awards for his coverage of the Cerritos air disaster in 1986.

Greene would return to anchoring the weeknight editions of Eyewitness News, starting with the 4 and 6 p.m. newscasts where he replaced Dunphy (who had moved to KHJ-TV, now KCAL-TV) in 1989 and moved to the 5 and 11 p.m. newscasts replacing Moyer (who returned to KNBC) in 1992. His weeknight co-anchors included Martin (1992–1994), Lisa McRee (1994–1997, who was tapped to replace Joan Lunden on Good Morning America) and Laura Diaz (1997–2000).

He exited KABC in August 2000 and later signed with KCBS in January 2001, reuniting him with former Eyewitness News colleagues Ann Martin (who moved to KCBS in 1994) and veteran sportscaster Jim Hill (who re-joined his old station in 1992). Two other KABC colleagues, Diaz in 2002 and weatherman Johnny Mountain in 2005, would join Greene and Martin at KCBS, reuniting many of members of KABC's Eyewitness News team during the 1980s and early 1990s.

By the time KCBS/KCAL dropped him and several other staffers on April 1, 2008 amid budget cuts, Greene had been co-anchoring KCAL's 4pm and KCBS's 6pm newscasts with Martin (who was also laid off). A station source indicated both anchors had elected to retire, but neither Greene, nor Martin made any official comment.

In addition to his aforementioned Golden Mike awards, Greene's honors also include the Columbia Graduate School of Journalism Award, nine Emmy nominations and two wins, three Edward R. Murrow Awards, and twelve L.A. Press Club Awards.

Greene has a star on the Hollywood Walk of Fame at 6906 Hollywood Boulevard.

Greene died on November 3, 2026, at the age of 82.
