= KCAL-TV =

Television station in Los Angeles

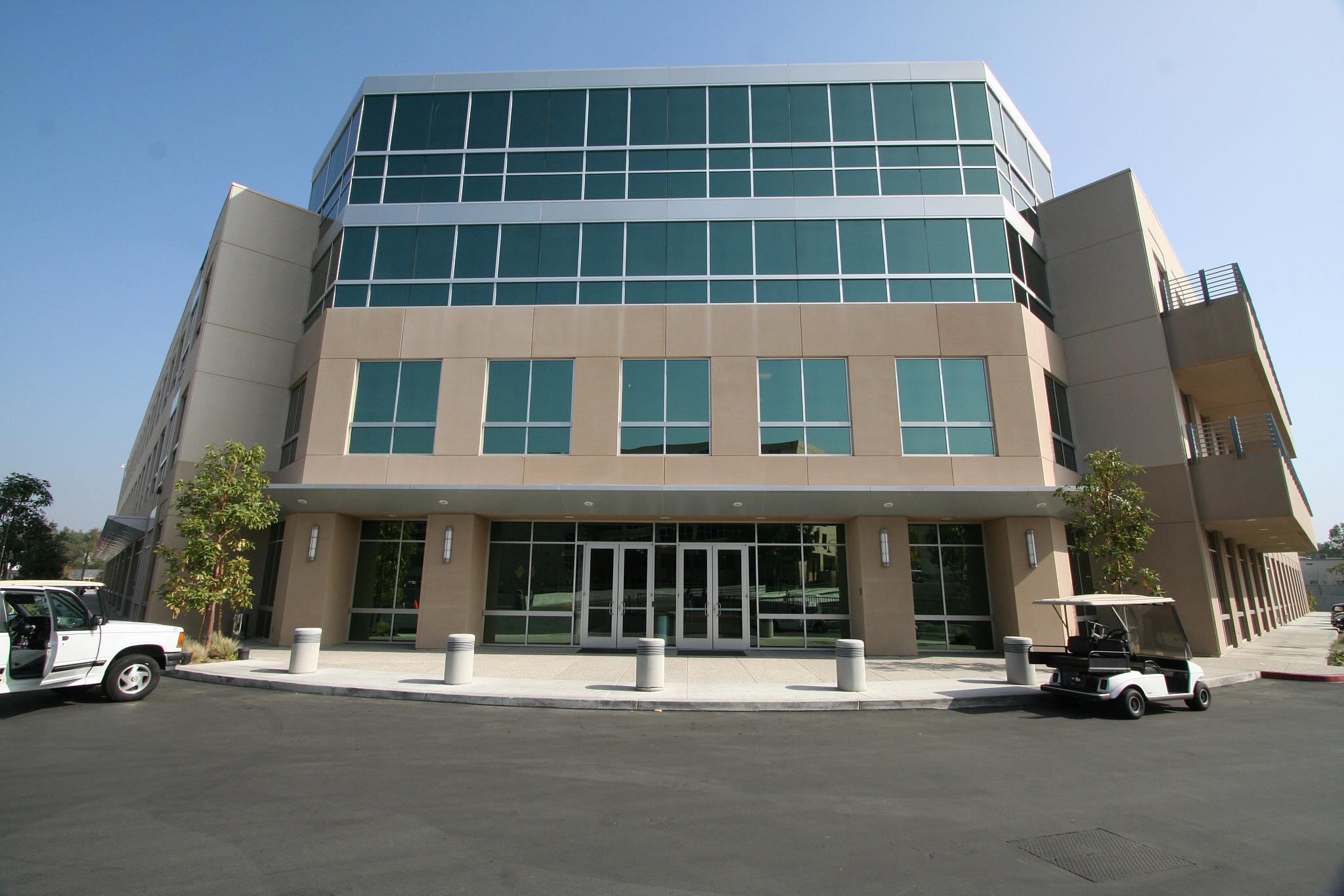
- KCAL and KCBS building in Studio City, Los Angeles
- Los Angeles, California; United States
- Channels: Digital: 9 (VHF); Virtual: 9
- Branding: KCAL 9; CBS LA

Programming
- Affiliations: 9.1: Independent; for others, see § Subchannels

Ownership
- Owner: CBS Television Stations; (Los Angeles Television Station KCAL LLC)
- Sister stations: KCBS-TV

History
- Founded: August 25, 1948
- First air date: October 6, 1948
- Former call signs: KFI-TV (1948–1951); KHJ-TV (1951–1989)
- Former channel numbers: Analog: 9 (VHF, 1948–2009); Digital: 43 (UHF, 2001–2009)
- Former affiliations: DuMont (1954–1956); United (1967)
- Call sign meaning: "California"

Technical information
- Licensing authority: FCC
- Facility ID: 21422
- ERP: 25 kW
- HAAT: 977 m (3,205 ft)
- Transmitter coordinates: 34°13′38″N 118°4′3″W
- Translator(s): see § Translators

Links
- Public license information: Public file; LMS
- Website: www.cbsnews.com/losangeles/

KCAL-TV (channel 9) is an independent television station in Los Angeles, California, United States. It is owned by the CBS Television Stations group alongside CBS West Coast flagship KCBS-TV (channel 2). The two stations share studios at the Radford Studio Center on Radford Avenue in the Studio City section of Los Angeles; KCAL-TV's transmitter is located atop Mount Wilson.

== History ==
=== KFI-TV (1948–1951) ===
Channel 9 signed on the air as commercial station KFI-TV on August 25, 1948, owned by Earle C. Anthony alongside KFI radio (640 AM). However, the station was originally licensed as experimental W6XEA about 1940, and in 1944 applied for the call letters KSEE (which are now used by the NBC affiliate in Fresno, California). It is unknown whether any transmissions occurred under either call sign.

The station initially broadcast a limited schedule with six hours weekly, and formally began operations on October 6, 1948, with 3 1/2 hours that day. Though KFI had long been affiliated with NBC Radio, KFI-TV did not affiliate with the then-upstart NBC Television Network as NBC was building its own station, KNBH (channel 4, now KNBC), which went on the air in January 1949. KFI general manager William B. Ryan indicated a willingness to affiliate with a network other than NBC or start a mutual regional network. Channel 9 has been an independent station for virtually its entire history, though it carried DuMont programming from 1954 up until that network's 1956 demise.

At the 3rd Emmy Awards in January 1951, the station won in the best educational show category for KFI-TV University.

=== KHJ-TV (1951–1989) ===
Channel 9's engineers threatened to go on strike in 1951 over financial reasons the station had to go through, leading Anthony to sell the station to the General Tire and Rubber Company in August of that year. A few months earlier, General Tire had purchased the Don Lee Broadcasting System, a regional West Coast radio network (the original Don Lee television station, KTSL (channel 2), was sold separately to CBS; it evolved into future sister KCBS-TV). Don Lee's flagship station was KHJ radio (930 AM), and General Tire changed its new television station's call letters to KHJ-TV in September 1951. One former employee referred to the call letters as standing for "kindness, happiness and joy", although the call sign was likely randomly assigned. The Don Lee name was so well respected in California broadcasting that KHJ-TV called itself "Don Lee Television" for a few years in the early 1950s, even though it had never been affiliated with KHJ radio until the 1951 deal.

In 1955, General Tire purchased RKO Radio Pictures to give the company's television station group access to RKO's film library. In 1959, General Tire's broadcasting and film divisions were merged as RKO General.

By the mid-1960s, channel 9 offered a standard independent schedule of movies, off-network reruns, children's shows like The Pancake Man hosted by Hal Smith (who showed educational shorts like The Space Explorers), first-run syndicated programs, and locally produced programs including local newscasts, sports events and public affairs programs. In the late 1960s, KHJ embarked on a novel, groundbreaking (and inexpensive) experiment, called Tempo, which heavily borrowed from the talk radio craze on local radio stations. Daytime programming was divided into three blocks running three hours in length, called Tempo I, Tempo II and Tempo III. The second of the three programs, Tempo II was perhaps the most active, controversial and innovative. For the first couple of years the hosts were Stan Bohrman and Maria Cole (the wife of Nat King Cole). Guests ranged from William F. Buckley to Sammy Davis Jr. and the political movers and shakers in Southern California. At one point, Stan even quit the program after what he called censorship on the topic of Eldridge Cleaver. Bohrman came back to the program and was joined by a new co-host, Regis Philbin. They became a very popular fixture in Los Angeles television. In fact, in his book about those days, Philbin credits the chemistry with Bohrman and the format of the program as forerunners of much of what would become the cable news format 20 years later.

In the early 1970s, KHJ-TV sought a similar programming strategy to that of crosstown competitor KTLA (channel 5), which focused more on talk shows, game shows, sports, feature films and off-network drama series. The cartoons were phased out (some of them moving to KTTV and KCOP-TV), and the station ran fewer off-network sitcoms. It did continue to have a weekday children's show called Froozles, which ran until the late 1980s. It also produced many half-hour public affairs programs, as well as a local talk show called Mid-Morning L.A. The first hosts were Kathy McKee and Sandy Baron on the Mid Day and Good Morning L.A. talk shows. Both were hired by KHJ's then-station manager Lional Schaen. Bob Hilton, Meredith MacRae, Geoff Edwards and Regis Philbin also hosted programs on the station well into the 1980s. Edwards and MacRae won Emmy Awards for their hosting duties during the early 1980s. Some other locally produced public affairs programs included the investigative show Camera 9 and The Changing Family, a program about family and social issues during the 1980s. Despite this, KHJ-TV was perceived as an also ran while KTLA was the leading independent station, even though it had a similar format.

Meanwhile, a behind-the-scenes battle was underway with serious implications for the station's future—and that of its owner. In 1965, RKO General faced a threat to its license for KHJ-TV from a group called Fidelity Television. At first, Fidelity's claim focused on channel 9's programming quality. Later, Fidelity levied a more serious claim that KHJ-TV was involved in reciprocal trade practices. Fidelity alleged that RKO's parent company, General Tire, forced its retailers to purchase advertising on KHJ-TV and other RKO-owned stations as a condition of their contracts with General Tire. An administrative law judge found in favor of Fidelity, but RKO appealed. In 1972, the FCC allowed RKO to keep the license for KHJ-TV, but two years later conditioned future renewals on the renewal of sister station WNAC-TV in Boston.

Six years later, the FCC stripped WNAC-TV of its license for numerous reasons, but largely because RKO had misled the commission about corporate misconduct at General Tire. The decision was affirmed after the Supreme Court declined to hear an appeal in April 1982. The FCC awarded a replacement license for channel 7 in Boston to New England Television, a merger of two competing groups for a new channel 7. RKO General sold off WNAC-TV's non-license assets to New England Television, who used them to launch WNEV-TV (now WHDH) in place of WNAC-TV that May 21. The WNAC-TV decision also meant KHJ-TV and sister station WOR-TV in New York City had lost their licenses, but an appeals court ruled that the FCC erred when it tied channel 9's renewal to that of WNAC-TV and ordered new hearings for KHJ-TV and WOR-TV.

The hearings dragged on for five years; as a result of this, the station was forced to air an unusually large amount of public-affairs programming; a combination of this and the station's cash reserves being drained by RKO's legal battles led to decreased ratings (and the station's perception as an "also-ran"). For a time, KHJ-TV's large slate of sports programming was virtually the only thing keeping the station afloat.

On August 11, 1987, FCC administrative law judge Edward Kuhlmann found RKO General unfit to be a broadcast licensee due to numerous cases of dishonesty on both its part and that of parent company GenCorp (the renamed General Tire), including fraudulent billing and lying about its ratings. Kuhlman ordered that all of RKO General's broadcast licenses be revoked. This ruling notably excluded WOR-TV, which had already been divested to MCA Inc. nine months prior, and was renamed WWOR-TV. GenCorp initially filed an appeal, only to withdraw it after the FCC warned that any appeal would almost certainly be denied outright. The FCC strongly advised GenCorp to divest its remaining properties to avoid the indignity of additional license stripping without any compensation.

=== KCAL-TV (1989–present) ===
==== Disney ownership (1988–1996) ====
In the midst of RKO's corporate issues, the company reached terms to sell KHJ-TV to Westinghouse Broadcasting in November 1985. However, the protracted legal issues delayed FCC action on the transfer and Westinghouse ultimately withdrew its offer. A short time later, RKO General agreed to sell the station to The Walt Disney Company; however, this transfer was also held up for over a year for the same reasons. Fidelity Television, the group that originally challenged the license in 1965, also argued against the sale. In July 1988, the FCC allowed Disney to acquire channel 9 for $324 million in a complicated settlement. RKO dropped its bid to renew the station's license, handing it to Fidelity Television. Disney then bought the channel 9 license from Fidelity for $105.4 million and KHJ-TV's non-license assets (intellectual property, studios, etc.) from RKO for $218.6 million. According to FCC general counsel Diane Killory, the settlement had the same effect as finding RKO unfit to be a broadcast licensee, and RKO thus had no choice but to "get out of the business of broadcasting" (though it would take another three years for RKO to unwind its broadcasting interests).

Disney began operating KHJ-TV on December 2, 1988. Over the next few months Disney fired channel 9's entire management team it inherited from RKO, including general manager Charles Velona and news director Stephanie Rank Brady. Several of the station's newscasters were pushed out as well. During the RKO/Fidelity/Disney transition, KHJ-TV's city of license was changed to the Los Angeles suburb of Norwalk, also as part of the FCC settlement. For all intents and purposes, though, it remained a Los Angeles station; the license was moved back to Los Angeles proper on October 28, 1991.

On December 2, 1989—the first anniversary of its ownership, Disney changed channel 9's callsign to the present KCAL-TV, and relaunched the station as "California 9", selected from a shortlist of three possible monikers. Channel 9's longtime radio sisters had changed their calls to KRTH some years before, so Disney was theoretically free to continue trading on the KHJ call letters' 66-year legacy in Southern California. However, newly hired station manager Blake Byrne said that market research revealed the station was seen as a "non-entity" in the market, leading Disney to conclude that it needed a fresh start. Disney did, however, keep a fresco mural of RKO stars in the station lobby. The station also continued to overhaul its format in the wake of its ownership change, adding a three-hour prime time newscast on March 5, 1990, featuring veteran newscasters Jerry Dunphy, Pat Harvey, Larry Carroll and Jane Velez-Mitchell. KCAL also added many more children's programs, including cartoons from the Walt Disney animation library (including the syndicated series DuckTales and Chip 'n Dale Rescue Rangers, and later The Disney Afternoon). The station also added a few more family-oriented off-network sitcoms and syndicated programs and then broadcast the popular anime series Dragon Ball Z, that lasted well into 1997. In the early 1990s, family sitcoms were gradually phased out and KCAL added more first-run syndicated talk, reality and court shows, as well as newsmagazine series.

On March 30, 1992, Disney agreed to sell KCAL-TV's license to Pinelands, Inc., then the parent company of channel 9's former New York City sister station, now called WWOR-TV. Disney would have received a 45% ownership stake in Pinelands, allowing for increased original programming to be shared between the two reunited stations. The planned merger never materialized; Pineland would agree to sell WWOR-TV to Chris-Craft Industries, then-parent of KCOP (channel 13). In 1995, the station adopted the "K-CAL 9" branding.

==== Young Broadcasting ownership (1996–2002) ====
In 1996, The Walt Disney Company purchased Capital Cities/ABC, owners of ABC West Coast flagship KABC-TV (channel 7). Due to FCC regulations at the time that barred the ownership of two television stations in the same media market, Disney chose to retain KABC-TV and divest KCAL, which was purchased by Young Broadcasting (which Disney owned a stake in at the time) on May 14, 1996, for $385 million. The afternoon children's program block would remain until 1999, when KCOP began airing a block of animated series that UPN contracted Disney to produce. By 2000, children's programs that aired during the morning hours were dropped as well under the ownership of Young Broadcasting.

==== CBS ownership (2002–present) ====
As a result of massive debt the company accrued from its 2000 purchase of its San Francisco station, KRON-TV (which lost its NBC affiliation in January 2002 due to a dispute between Young and the network), Young Broadcasting put KCAL up for sale in 2002. With duopolies now allowed by the FCC, the station was purchased by CBS, then a subsidiary of Viacom, on February 14, 2002; the deal was finalized on June 1, 2002. KCAL's operations were merged with those of KCBS-TV, and channel 9 moved from its longtime headquarters at the Viacom-owned Paramount Studios on Melrose Avenue in Hollywood to CBS Columbia Square, located one mile (1.6 km) north of the studio lot; the Melrose Avenue facility was subsequently occupied by then-sister station KRTH (which had previously been based out of the Columbia Square facility), and is currently used by the Paramount studio tour. The sale reunited the station with fellow former RKO General property KRTH-FM, which CBS acquired in 1997. The properties were split again when CBS spun off its radio division to Entercom (now Audacy, Inc.) in 2017.

When CBS/Viacom bought KCAL-TV, broadcasting industry observers speculated that UPN's programming would move to KCAL from KCOP-TV. KCOP's previous owners, Chris-Craft Industries, had co-founded UPN with Viacom in 1995, and owned 50% of the network before selling its stake in UPN to Viacom in 2000. Fox Television Stations purchased KCOP and most of Chris-Craft's UPN stations in 2001. However, CBS continued to operate channel 9 as an independent station, as Fox renewed its affiliation agreement for its UPN affiliates; it is widely believed that Fox used KCOP as leverage to keep UPN on Fox-owned stations in New York City (WWOR-TV, KCAL's former sister station) and Chicago (WPWR-TV), threatening to drop the network in those markets should Viacom move the UPN affiliation in Los Angeles to KCAL. This issue became moot with the January 2006 announcement of the merger of UPN and The WB into The CW Television Network. The new network launched on September 18, 2006, with former WB affiliate KTLA as its Los Angeles outlet, due to an affiliation agreement with owner Tribune Broadcasting that resulted in 16 of Tribune's WB affiliates joining the network. KCAL-TV remains an independent station, and is currently one of thirteen such stations owned by CBS as a result of the CBS-owned CW stations reverting to independent status in 2023.

On April 21, 2007, KCBS-TV and KCAL-TV moved from Columbia Square to an all-digital facility at the CBS Studio Center in Studio City. The move allowed both stations to begin broadcasting all locally produced programs in high definition, and in addition, the two stations operate in a completely tapeless newsroom. This newsroom is named in honor newscaster Jerry Dunphy, who worked at both stations during his career. With the move to Studio City and KCET's later move to Burbank, KTLA is currently the only remaining station in Los Angeles (either in radio or television) whose studios are operated out of Hollywood.

KCAL-TV logo used from 2003 to 2023

KCAL-TV shut down its analog signal, over VHF channel 9, at 1:10 p.m. on June 12, 2009, and converted its broadcasts exclusively to digital television as part of the federally mandated transition from analog to digital television. The station's digital signal relocated from its pre-transition UHF channel 43 to VHF channel 9. Sister station KCBS-TV took over the channel 43 allocation as it moved its digital signal from channel 60 as a result of the phaseout of channels 52–69.

On December 4, 2019, CBS Corporation and Viacom remerged into ViacomCBS (now Paramount Skydance).

On January 5, 2023, as part of a general rebranding of its news department coinciding with the launch of new morning news blocks, KCAL changed its branding to KCAL News, which was adopted across KCBS-TV's newscasts on the same day. In October 2025, the news operation was rebranded as CBS LA to match the branding scheme used by other CBS-owned stations, whereas the station reverted its branding back to KCAL 9.

== Programming ==
Although KCAL-TV is an independent station, it will occasionally air CBS programming due to extended breaking news coverage or special events that may result in programs being unable to air on KCBS-TV.

For E/I programming, KCAL has the Go Time syndicated block.

KCAL was the Southern California home of the annual MDA Labor Day Telethon between 1997 and 2011.

In June 1979, KHJ-TV aired "Thames on 9", a week-long prime time programming stunt that featured programs from Thames Television, then a member of the British ITV network. Shows that aired during that week included Man About the House (on which the American sitcom Three's Company was based) and The Benny Hill Show; a similar stunt had aired on KHJ-TV's former New York City sister station WOR-TV two years earlier.

From 1981 to 1985, KHJ-TV was home to Elvira's Movie Macabre. KHJ-TV was home to the live broadcast of the Strawberry Festival Parade in Garden Grove, California, from 1986 until 1989.

=== Sports programming ===
For much of its history overall, sports have been a part of channel 9's identity. Indeed, during the station's two-decade licensing dispute, its large slate of sports programming was essentially the only thing that kept it as part of the Southern California television landscape.

As of 2023, KCAL has the rights to six games a season from the NHL's Los Angeles Kings, produced by Bally Sports West. KCAL was also home to the Kings in the early 1980s and during the mid-to-late 1990s. As of 2025, KCAL+ also holds the broadcast rights to the Ontario Reign, the minor league affiliate of the Kings. Since 2024, KCAL has the rights to select matches featuring Orange County SC of the USL Championship.

KCAL-TV previously held the broadcast television rights to the Los Angeles Dodgers baseball team, carrying a slate of games from 2006 to 2013, televising at least 50 games each year, with all telecasts being broadcast in high definition. In 2014, KCAL lost rights to the Dodger telecasts to the cable-exclusive regional sports network SportsNet LA, which is co-owned by the team and Charter Communications.

Channel 9 is best known as the longtime broadcast home of the NBA's Los Angeles Lakers. The station carried Lakers games from 1961 to 1964 (as KHJ-TV), and again from 1977 to 2012. The latter 35 years were the NBA's longest consecutive station-team broadcast partnership, and coincided with the Lakers' golden eras of the 1980s and early 2000s. For most of channel 9's second stint with the Lakers, it aired road games only. In 2012, KCAL lost rights to the Lakers telecasts to the cable-exclusive regional sports network Spectrum SportsNet and Spectrum Deportes which was renamed in 2016 after the merger of Time Warner Cable and Charter Communications.

From 1961 to 1963, KHJ-TV was the first television home of the Los Angeles Angels; the baseball team's telecasts moved to KTLA in 1964, when then-Angels owner Gene Autry's Golden West Broadcasters purchased that station. The television rights to Angels games returned to KCAL-TV in 1996 (The Walt Disney Company's ownership interest in the Angels briefly overlapped its stewardship of the station), and added more basketball coverage that same year with the Los Angeles Clippers, in addition to its Lakers telecasts. The station and the Clippers parted ways in 2001 as they eventually moved their over-the-air telecasts to KTLA, while the Angels left KCAL after the 2005 season, moving to KCOP the following year. In addition, KCAL had broadcast select weekend Mighty Ducks of Anaheim games from the NHL team's inaugural season in 1993 (both the team and KCAL were Disney properties until 1996) until 2006, when the Ducks moved their over-the-air broadcasts to Anaheim-based independent station KDOC-TV. Also, at the end of the 2013 season, the Dodgers would part ways with KCAL-TV (becoming cable-exclusive on SportsNet LA, although a few games per season have been seen on KTLA since 2016), thus ending the station's 36-year run of local sports coverage.

KCAL also carried select Los Angeles Galaxy Major League Soccer games until 2005, when the games became cable-exclusive to Fox Sports West. In 1997, KCAL premiered the first fifteen-minute weekday sports report Final Quarter, the show was an expansion of the typical five-minute sports report seen towards the end of a newscast. Several years later, the show was renamed KCAL 9 Sports News and with the purchase by CBS and the formation of the duopoly between KCAL and KCBS-TV, was renamed Sports Central; the show has since expanded to a half-hour broadcast on Friday through Sunday evenings.

Channel 9 has aired preseason coverage of the NFL's Chargers (then based in San Diego) from 2005 to 2016, and aired games from the Chargers' AFC West Division rival, the Raiders (then based in Oakland) in 2006 (whose preseason games also aired on the station during the mid-1990s). Although Los Angeles returned to the NFL in the 2016 season via the Rams' return after two decades in St. Louis, sister station KCBS is the Rams' preseason partner. After 2016, the Chargers relocated back to Los Angeles after 56 years in San Diego and KABC-TV picked up the Chargers preseason coverage starting in the 2017 season. KCAL broadcast two NFL on CBS games during the 2017 regular season as part of an arrangement with the NFL that saw CBS get both a Rams and Chargers game on weeks when Fox had the doubleheader.

Since its founding in 1994 until 2008, KCAL was the originating station of the annual John R. Wooden Classic college basketball game.

=== Newscasts ===
KCAL-TV presently broadcasts a total of 61 hours of locally produced newscasts each week (with 10 hours each weekday, six hours on Saturdays and five hours on Sundays).

Because of the amount of news programming on the station, channel 9 is known for showing the most police chases among the Los Angeles market's news-producing stations. Often regular news programming on KCAL is suspended to cover a police chase, and programs that follow the newscast are sometimes preempted to show the chase's conclusion. In 2003, KCAL reported a quadrupling of ratings every time a police chase was shown, with up to 1.6 million viewers watching at a given time during such events. Between 2012 and 2020 (when he moved to KTTV), chases were often shown with the voice and in-air helicopter camera work of Stu Mundel; since 2021, former KNX pilot Desmond Shaw took over Mundel's role as the duopoly's chief helicopter reporter.

In the 1970s, KHJ-TV aired a prime time newscast at 10 p.m., which was moved to 9 p.m. in 1984; the station subsequently added a half-hour 8 p.m. newscast in 1988, and also carried afternoon newscasts throughout this time. Some of its most notable personalities included anchors George Putnam, Chris Harris, Stan Bohrman, Tom Lawrence, Nathan Roberts, Lonnie Lardner, Linda Edwards and weather personality Andrew Amador.

Shortly after taking over, Disney invested $30 million on upgrading the station's news department, tripling the number of staff and investing on electronic news equipment, including expanding the stations' studio facility at Paramount Studios to house a new newsroom and studio; the station also hired veteran newscasters Jerry Dunphy, Pat Harvey, Larry Carroll and Jane Velez-Mitchell. After retaining, in the interim, the existing 8 p.m. and 9 p.m. newscasts, and a delay on its launch from January 15, in March 5, 1990, Disney implemented the concept of a prime time news block, with the three-hour long Prime 9 News airing from 8 to 11 pm. A few years later in the early 1990s, KCAL added a short-lived half-hour newscast at 6:30 p.m. called First 9 News, which focused primarily on local news and competed against the national network newscasts aired on KCBS-TV, KNBC and KABC-TV (KCBS also aired a 6:30 p.m. newscast during the mid to late 1990s, while the CBS Evening News aired at 5:30 pm). Under Disney ownership, more daytime newscasts were added to channel 9 weekdays at 2 and 3 pm, and the 6:30 p.m. newscast was discontinued (a local newscast returned to that timeslot in the market in January 2009, when KTLA launched its own 6:30 p.m. newscast).

KCAL is notable for airing newscasts during unconventional time periods; the station maintains the large amount of local newscasts that it presently does (which is far more than what is typical of most stations involved in a duopoly with a major network station) simply due to the fact that KCAL and KCBS-TV's newscasts air in timeslots that do not compete against one another, as a result, the station's newscast schedule remained unchanged after KCAL merged its operations with KCBS. Along with newscasts at noon (where it competes against KTLA), 4 p.m. (where it competes against KABC, KTLA and KNBC) and 10 p.m. (where it competes against KTLA and KTTV), and seven nights a week at 8 and 9 p.m.

KCAL's newscasts are variable in tone, depending on the timeslot. Its 8 p.m. newscast is generally an update on the day's news, which largely features stories focusing on California and the Los Angeles area (and was previously branded as the California Report during the Prime 9 News era). Its 9 p.m. newscast is generally the most serious in format (and was branded in previous years as the Prime 9 News World Report), that newscast prominently features political, business and international news. The noon newscast, on the other hand, features lighter stories, including features on food, health and the entertainment industry. The 4 p.m. newscast was essentially a repurposed KCBS-TV newscast and was presented by former channel 2 anchors Harold Greene and Ann Martin, who did not appear recently elsewhere on KCAL. The 4 p.m. newscast moved to KCAL from KCBS-TV in 2002 to make room for Dr. Phil, which by contractual stipulations was not allowed to air opposite The Oprah Winfrey Show (which aired in Los Angeles on KABC-TV at 3 pm, until its syndication run ended in September 2011). Its 10 p.m. newscast is simply more of an update of the 8 p.m. news (and during the Prime 9 News era, was simply branded as the 10 O'Clock Report), as it competes with KTTV and KTLA (and in the past, KCOP), though in recent years, it has been shortened to 30 minutes, to make way for the local sports news program Sports Central.

On April 1, 2008, CBS Television Stations ordered widespread budget cuts and staff layoffs from its stations. As a result of the budget cuts, roughly 10 to 15 staffers were released from KCBS-TV and KCAL-TV, including reporters Jennifer Sabih, Greg Phillips and Jennifer Davis. 4 p.m. co-anchors Greene and Martin, who were then also the 6 p.m. anchors on KCBS-TV, were also said to have been on the layoff list, but both decided to retire from television upon the June 2009 expiration of their contracts. On April 23, 2009, former KTTV anchor Rick Garcia joined KCAL, and was paired with Pat Harvey as co-anchor of the station's weeknight 8 and 10 p.m. newscasts (Garcia is now paired with Sharon Tay, as Harvey moved to sister station KCBS-TV to co-anchor that station's 5 and 11 p.m. newscasts).

==== NewsCentral era ====
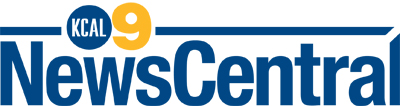
KCAL 9 NewsCentral logo.

On September 19, 2009, KCBS and KCAL rebranded the newscasts on both stations to the unified NewsCentral branding (unrelated to Sinclair Broadcast Group's now-defunct national news division of the same name; CBS coincidentally owns former Sinclair station KOVR in Sacramento). The newscasts were refocused to cover more community news, including stories from outlying communities. Local news headlines from the Los Angeles Newspaper Group and MediaNews Group newspapers were displayed on a ticker, "street team" submissions of video and photos from viewers were featured, reporters ended stories with NewsCentral rather than the individual station brands, and microphone flags and news vehicles were branded to show both stations' logos at once (previously, the KCBS and KCAL logos were displayed on alternating sides). Under the NewsCentral format, the two stations claimed that they covered more local news than any other television station in the country (with reporters in Ventura County, the Inland Empire and Orange County), and the only Los Angeles television station with two helicopters (subcontracted to Angel City Air, owned by reporter Larry Welk). Ed Asner was used to introduce the new newscast. CBS denies this move was made in response to other stations pooling newsgathering resources.

On December 10, 2009, CBS Television Stations hired Steve Mauldin to replace Patrick McClenahan as president and general manager of the KCBS-KCAL duopoly. That week, the duopoly ultimately rescinded the NewsCentral branding, reverting to the "CBS2" and "KCAL9" news identities. The NewsCentral graphics, mic flags and logos remained in use during the interim, though on-air staff no longer used the NewsCentral identity.

==== Recent history ====
On January 14, 2012, KCAL debuted two-hour-long weekend morning newscasts (airing at 7 a.m. on Saturdays and on Sundays, which follow one-hour newscasts on KCBS); the programs are KCAL's first morning newscasts—ironically though, channel 9 was the only news-producing station in the market that did not have a news program on weekday mornings.

On December 10, 2014, KCAL announced it would be dropping its hour long 2 p.m. and half-hour 3 p.m. newscasts before the end of the year to be replaced by Judge Mathis and The People's Court. As a result, the 4 p.m. newscast was truncated from an hour to 30 minutes, and Inside Edition moved from 3:30 p.m. to the 4:30 p.m. slot previously occupied by the other half of the 4 p.m. newscast.

As of September 11, 2017, KCAL has reinstated the second half-hour of the 4 p.m. newscast and making the news a full hour.

On July 12, 2022, KCAL announced that it would launch a seven-hour morning newscast from 4 to 11 am, replacing that of KCBS and marking the first-ever weekday morning newscast in the station's history; the new KCAL News Mornings launched on January 5, 2023. At this time, KCBS replaced its existing morning newscast with a broadcast of the live Eastern edition of the network's national morning show CBS Mornings, followed by a simulcast of the 6 a.m. hour of KCAL News Mornings. In addition, to emphasize the station's history and reputation for local news programming, all newscasts across the KCBS-KCAL duopoly were rebranded as KCAL News, and the station changed its on-air branding from "KCAL 9" to "KCAL Los Angeles". On October 13, 2025, KCBS and KCAL rebranded their news operation as CBS LA. As a result, KCAL reverted its on-air branding as "KCAL 9".

==== Notable alumni ====
- Jerry Dunphy
- Mike Emanuel
- Carter Evans
- Rich Fields
- Hal Fishman
- Harold Greene
- Pat Harvey
- Jim Hill
- Sharon Ito
- Lisa Joyner
- Kristine Leahy
- Tawny Little
- Dave Malkoff
- Ann Martin
- Byron Miranda
- Leyna Nguyen
- Charles Perez
- Cassandra Peterson (host of Elvira's Movie Macabre, retained full rights to the Elvira character after departing KHJ-TV)
- Hank Plante
- George Putnam
- Bill Ritter
- Tracie Savage
- David Sheehan
- Kent Shocknek
- Don Steele (host of The Real Don Steele Show)
- Mark Steines
- Jane Velez-Mitchell

== Technical information ==
=== Subchannels ===
The station's signal is multiplexed:

Subchannels of KCAL-TV
Subchannel	Res.	Short name	Programming
9.1	1080i	KCAL-DT	Main KCAL-TV programming
9.2	480i	Nest	The Nest
9.3	480i	Comet	Comet
9.4	480i	HSN	HSN
9.5	480i	QVC	QVC
9.6	720p	KCAL+	KCAL+/Defy

=== Translators ===
- K21MH-D Daggett
- K29NN-D Lucerne Valley
- K32OX-D Lucerne Valley
- K32EM-D Morongo Valley
- K21IN-D Ridgecrest
- K17GJ-D Twentynine Palms
- K16LB-D Yucca Valley
