= Conan Nolan =

American journalist

- Education: San Luis Obispo High School
- Alma mater: California Polytechnic State University; University of California, Davis (B.A.)
- Occupation: Television journalist
- Years active: 1979-present
- Employer: KNBC (1986–present)
- Notable credit: News Conference Anchor
- Spouse: Julie Dear Nolan
- Children: 1

Conan Patrick Nolan is the political reporter for KNBC-TV in Los Angeles., NBC-Universal's flagship station for the western United States. He is also the host of the station's News Conference program, one of the nation's longest running local political/public affairs shows. Established in 1966 by Tom Brokaw and Bob Abernethy, News Conference normally broadcasts Sunday mornings following Meet the Press in the Los Angeles market. Previous hosts include Warren Olney IV, Linda Douglass, and Jess Marlow.

== Early life and education ==
Nolan is from San Luis Obispo, California. His father Thomas F. Nolan, a former U.S. diplomat, was an unsuccessful candidate for the California State Senate in 1960. His father later taught political science at Cal Poly San Luis Obispo. His mother raised five children.

Nolan attended San Luis Obispo High School and spent two years studying journalism. During that period, he volunteered at various radio stations and briefly hosted a program on public station KCBX-FM titled “Political Profile,” where he interviewed such figures as Leon Panetta, former U.S. Secretary of Defense, who at that time was the congressman representing San Luis Obispo.

Nolan completed his degree in Political Science at the University of California, Davis.

== Broadcasting career ==
Nolan's first full-time broadcasting position was at KVEC-AM radio in San Luis Obispo, where he served as the Assistant News Director. Two years later, he moved to television, first as a weekday reporter and weekend sports anchor at KSBY-TV. He later moved to KSBW-TV in the Salinas/Monterey market. Among the stories he covered was actor Clint Eastwood's campaign for mayor of Carmel, California.

In July 1986, Nolan was hired by KNBC-TV News Director Tom Capra, the former executive producer of The Today Show and son of film director Frank Capra. Over the course of his career, he has covered numerous fires, floods, earthquakes, police chases and riots. In 1989, he reported live for NBC News from Candlestick Park moments after the 7.2 magnitude Loma Prieta earthquake (he had been on vacation attending the sporting event at the stadium). In 1992, he broke the investigation into singer/entertainer Michael Jackson by the Los Angeles Police Department. In 1994, reported live during the police pursuit while driving in front of O. J. Simpson’s white Ford Bronco.

Nolan also reported from Iraq during Operation Iraqi Freedom; Pakistan during the war in Afghanistan; Lebanon during the anniversary of the September 11 attacks; and in Kobe and Tokyo, Japan following two massive earthquakes in 1995 and 2011, respectively. He has also reported from Rome, Tel Aviv, Mexico City and the small island of Tuvalu in the South Pacific. In January 2025, he reported on-site during the Los Angeles wildfire event.

== Awards ==
Nolan was selected in 2010 as the television “Journalist of the Year” for the Los Angeles chapter of the Society of Professional Journalists.

He has a Golden Mike Award for a story chronicling the plight of Afghan refugee children along the Pakistani frontier and has a regional Emmy Award for a series on the small South Pacific island of Tuvalu in its struggle against global warming.

== Personal life ==
Nolan is married to Julie Dear Nolan. The couple have one son, Jefferson.
