= Paul Moyer =

American journalist (born 1941)

- Born: June 13, 1941 (age 85); Los Angeles, California, U.S.
- Education: Torrance High School; University of Arizona
- Occupation: Journalist
- Children: Elise; Paul; Dylan; Kyle
- Relatives: Micah Ohlman (nephew)

Paul Moyer (born Paul Douglas Moir on June 13, 1941) is an American journalist. He co-anchored the 5 PM and 11 PM weekday editions of KNBC's Channel 4 News with Colleen Williams for a decade after earlier co-anchoring with Kelly Lange. Moyer has worked primarily in the two major television markets—New York and Los Angeles—in addition to briefly working on network newscasts. Moyer was Los Angeles' longest-running news anchor following the death of KTLA anchor Hal Fishman on August 7, 2007.

== Early life and career ==
A native of Los Angeles, Moyer attended Torrance High School and the University of Arizona (class of 1964), and tried out for the Pittsburgh Pirates before beginning a broadcasting career. While attending the University of Arizona, he began his broadcasting career with positions at Tucson radio stations KOLD-AM (now KTZR) as an announcer and sports director, then with KTKT as a disk jockey. After graduation, he also worked at KXOA (now KIID) in Sacramento as reporter and news director.

Later, Moyer made the transition into television. He served positions at KTIV in Sioux City, Iowa; WMBD radio and WMBD-TV in Peoria, Illinois; KTVI in St. Louis; KDKA radio and KDKA-TV in Pittsburgh; and then WCBS-TV in New York City.

== Career in Los Angeles ==
=== KNBC (1972–1979) ===
Moyer was hired by NBC News in March 1972 and returned to Los Angeles, joining KNBC as reporter and weekend anchor. The KNBC Newservice, as it was known then, featured Jess Marlow, Tom Snyder, Bob Abernethy, and Tom Brokaw as the main nightly anchors and was the first serious competition in the local news ratings against KNXT's The Big News/Eleven O'Clock Report with Jerry Dunphy. Moyer soon moved to weeknights, first taking over the 11:00 p.m. newscast in July 1973 after Brokaw became NBC News' chief White House correspondent. More than a year, in November 1974 Moyer became sole anchor of KNBC's 6:00 p.m. program with Snyder's reassignment to New York; John Schubeck would replace Moyer on the 11:00 p.m. newscast. Aside from anchoring and reporting, Moyer also co-hosted KNBC's weekend features program Sunday, working alongside longtime KNBC personality Kelly Lange, who was a weathercaster with the station before being elevated to co-anchor on evenings with Moyer in 1976, when KNBC reformatted its news programs under the NewsCenter 4 banner. KNBC, however, relieved Moyer of his anchor duties in the Spring of 1979 and Moyer departed the station shortly thereafter.

=== KABC-TV (1979–1992) ===
In late 1979, Moyer moved over to rival KABC-TV initially as a "senior correspondent" for Eyewitness News. Soon, however, when the weekday operation expanded to three hours in the early evening in September 1980, Moyer was named co-anchor of the 5 p.m. hour with Ann Martin. He soon replaced Dunphy (who had moved to KABC in 1975) on the 11 p.m. news after the latter was shot during a robbery attempt near the studio in 1983; the appointment would become permanent a year later. Moyer also co-anchored Eyewitness News with Tawny Little and Terry Murphy. Moyer also had hosting stints on several of KABC-TV's local programs including A.M. Los Angeles, Eyewitness Los Angeles and Eye on L.A. On April 30, 1992, he toured Los Angeles in a helicopter to observe damage from the Los Angeles riots.

Moyer was a visible face on the ABC network in the mid-1980s, appearing as a correspondent on Eye on Hollywood and substituting on World News This Morning and Good Morning America. He departed from KABC-TV in spring of 1992.

=== Return to KNBC ===
In July 1992, after a highly publicized bidding war, Moyer returned to KNBC (on what was then the Channel 4 News) to co-anchor with longtime San Francisco anchorwoman-journalist Wendy Tokuda. However, when ratings failed to surpass KABC's, Moyer was once again paired with Lange on the 11:00 p.m. news from 1993 to 1997 and with Colleen Williams on the 5:00 p.m. and, in 1997, the 11:00 p.m. news; both Moyer and Lange received seven-figure salaries. According to a June 2007 article in Los Angeles Magazine, Moyer's salary was rumored to be closer to $8 million.

In May 2006, Moyer led an investigation on the rapidly increasing Chemtrail/Weather modification problem in Southern California. His four-minute report Toxic Sky, produced for KNBC in Los Angeles, went viral on the Internet almost as soon as it was posted to their official website NBC4.TV (now nbclosangeles.com).

On April 1, 2009, KNBC's Colleen Williams announced, during the evening newscast, that Moyer had decided to retire after nearly 17 years at the station. Moyer's salary was estimated at more than $3 million a year of his time of retirement. In 1980 he was earning $250,000, and by 1993 it was cut to $1 million per annum.

=== Other media work ===
Moyer appeared as himself on the TV show The West Wing while doing an election-night stint for MSNBC.

== Personal life ==
Moyer is married and has four children, Elise, Paul, Dylan and Kyle. His nephew, Micah Ohlman, had anchored the weekend newscasts at rival KABC and is now anchoring at KTLA. He was at one time designated the honorary mayor of West Los Angeles.

Moyer is known as an avid car collector, particularly interested in Ferrari cars, Ford GTs, and other sports cars. He won the Toyota Pro/Celebrity Race in 1988.

In 2011 he sold the family home worth $9.5 million to buy a more modest retirement home in Los Angeles.

== In popular culture ==
The morning duo Kevin and Bean on KROQ-FM made fun of Moyer on a regular basis for his presentation style and alleged behind-the-scenes temper. An audio tape from 1990 featured Moyer verbally berating Ann Martin when they anchored together just seconds before the 11 p.m. newscast began over an argument of who was going to read the first segment. The audio tape references Moyer bad-mouthing rival anchor Harold Greene while accusing Martin of drinking before the newscast. Moyer suggests the two should take up their issues with Roger Bell, KABC-TV's News Director.

== Filmography ==
- Heat (1995) – self
- Boomtown (2002) – self
- One Six Right (2005) – self
