= Christine Lund =

American journalist (born 1943)

- Born: November 25, 1943 (age 82); Sweden
- Occupation: News anchor (Retired)
- Employer(s): WLXT-TV 1969–1970; KGO-TV 1970–1972; KABC-TV 1972–1986, 1990–1998
- Children: 2 Daughters

Christine Lund, also known as Christine Lundstedt (born November 25, 1943, in Sweden) is a former popular Los Angeles news anchor for KABC-TV from the early 1970s to the late 1990s and consistently garnered high ratings.

== Biography ==
Born in Sweden and raised in Chicago, Lund began her broadcasting career where she briefly worked at WLXT-TV in Aurora as the station's news director. In 1970, she joined ABC owned-and-operated station KGO-TV in San Francisco as a reporter. Later, Lund moved south to Los Angeles sister station KABC in 1972 as a reporter and anchor. She anchored the newscasts at 6:00 pm and 11:00 pm. Throughout much of her first tenure, she co-anchored with Jerry Dunphy. Lund left KABC in June 1986 after negotiations to reduce her work schedule were unsuccessful. For the next four years, Lund remained out of broadcasting to raise her family. She returned to the station in November 1990. During her second tenure, Lund anchored the 11:30 am and 4:00 pm newscasts alongside at various points Harold Greene, future Las Vegas newscaster Steve Wolford and current KABC newscaster Marc Brown until she officially left the station in 1998.

== Personal ==
Lund has two grown daughters, and currently lives on the Northwest coast of the US.

== Urban legend ==
Lund was rumored to be the "bubble-headed bleach blonde" referred to in Don Henley's 1982 song "Dirty Laundry".
