= Jess Marlow =

American journalist (1929–2014)

- Born: Myron Jess Marlow; November 29, 1929; Salem, Illinois, U.S.
- Died: August 3, 2014 (aged 84); Denver, Colorado, U.S.
- Occupation: News anchor
- Notable credit(s): KNTV; KNBC/NBC News; KCBS-TV; KCET
- Spouse: Phyllis

Myron Jess Marlow (November 29, 1929 – August 3, 2014) was an American journalist. He was best known for his work on television in Los Angeles, California, where he spent the bulk of his career.

== Early career ==
Marlow began his television career in 1958 at WHBF-TV in Rock Island, Illinois. He then moved to San Jose, California, where he joined KNTV as a reporter. He would later become an anchor at that station, as well as its news director. Among the stories Marlow covered at KNTV was the beginning of Ronald Reagan's first campaign for Governor of California.

== Work in Los Angeles ==
NBC News hired Marlow in 1966 and sent him to KNBC in Los Angeles. Aside from reporting, his first assignment at KNBC included moderating the station's weekly public affairs program News Conference. When the station launched The KNBC News Service, a weeknight two-and-a-half hour block of news in March 1968, Marlow was elevated to an anchor. He was joined on the KNBC desk by two future stalwarts of NBC News, Bob Abernethy and Tom Brokaw. Marlow was on the network's list of candidates to join Barbara Walters on the Today Show following Frank McGee's death in 1974; NBC passed over Marlow and others in favor of Jim Hartz, who would be replaced by Brokaw just two years later. Nevertheless, Marlow did return to Today in a substitute capacity as a fill-in host for Brokaw and as a fill-in newscaster for Floyd Kalber.

In 1980, Marlow left KNBC (whose newscasts were known at NewsCenter 4 at the time of his departure) and moved to CBS-owned KNXT (which became KCBS-TV in 1984) as its lead male anchor for Channel 2 News. While at KNXT/KCBS, his co-anchors included Connie Chung, Sandy Hill, John Schubeck (who had also worked with Marlow at KNBC) and Colleen Williams. Marlow returned to KNBC in 1986 where, as a special correspondent Marlow appeared nightly on what was then called the Channel 4 News. He also anchored the 5:00 p.m. news with Williams until 1992 when he transferred to the 6:00 p.m. news alongside Kelly Lange (briefly), then Wendy Tokuda until stepping down in April 1997. In addition, Marlow also resumed his role as moderator of KNBC News Conference, continuing in that position until he retired in December 2000.

Marlow's retirement was brief; he returned to host Life & Times, a Southern California public affairs program on PBS member television station KCET in January 2001 until he officially retired in 2003. In retirement, he moved to Santa Fe, New Mexico and later to Loveland, Colorado.

During his 37 years in Los Angeles, which began in 1966, he won numerous awards, including an Emmy and a star on the Hollywood Walk of Fame on 14 May 1999, located at 6420 Hollywood Boulevard.

He had worked with many television news anchors during his period in Los Angeles, including Kelly Lange, Colleen Williams, Paul Moyer and his "Life & Times" co-host Val Zavala. He was also very involved in professional journalism organizations, including to help found the Foundation for American Communications which, for more than a quarter-century, was the leading educator of working journalists. He received many awards for his outstanding reporting and leadership in journalism and was highly regarded by his colleagues and those he covered.

At his last broadcast, Marlow said: "You may have heard and you may have cheered that it's my final broadcast, and I hope I'm glad to be here."
