= Kelly Lange =

American journalist (born 1937)

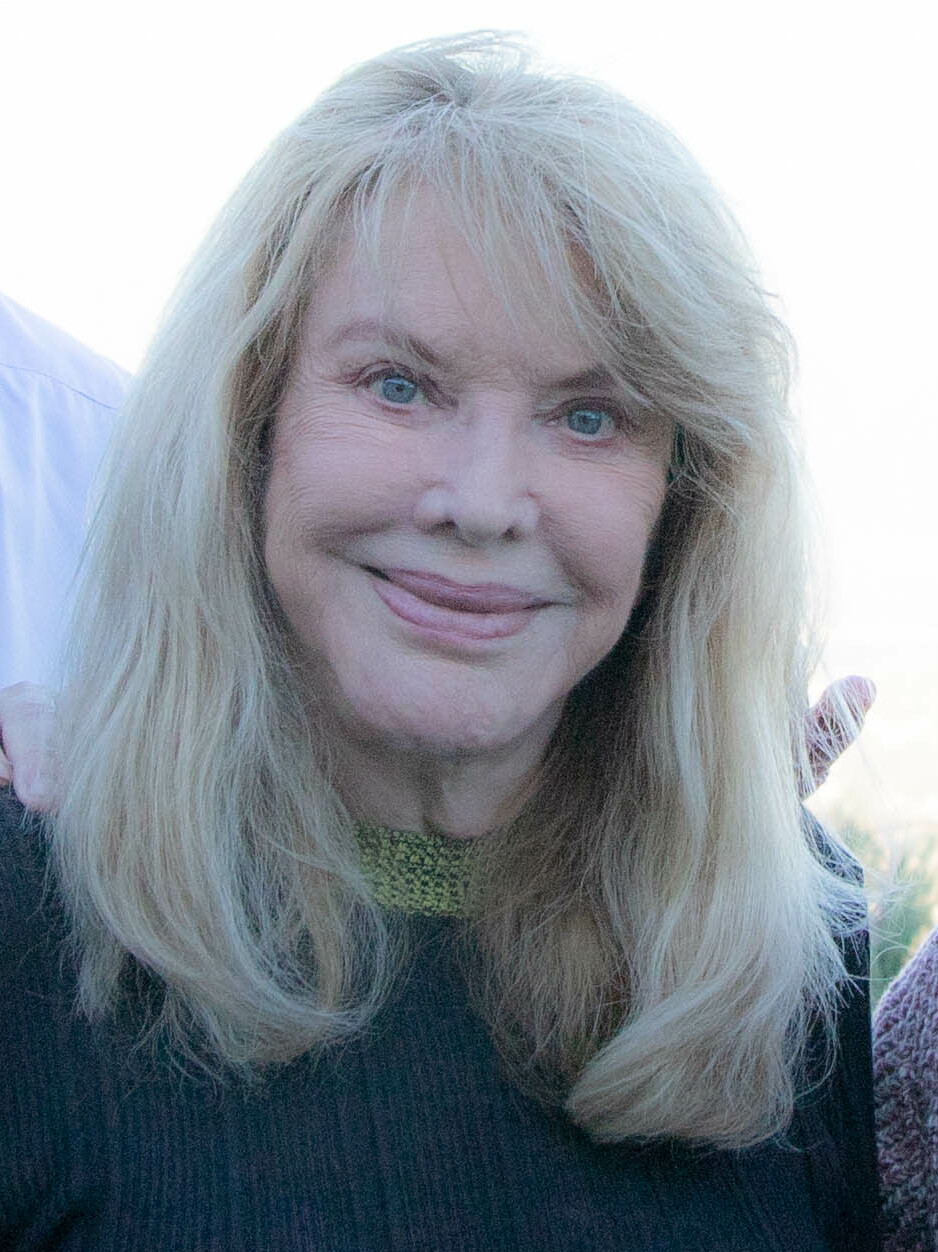
- Lange in 2023
- Born: Dorothy Scafard; December 14, 1937 (age 88); New York City, US
- Education: Merrimack College
- Occupation: Newscaster
- Years active: 1971–2001
- Employer: KNBC-TV/KCBS-TV
- Spouse: William Friedkin (m. 1987; div. 1990)
- Awards: Emmy

Kelly Lange (born Dorothy Scafard; December 14, 1937) is an American journalist, most notable for being the first woman to be a nightly news anchor in Los Angeles. Lange, a Shakespeare major in college, is a longtime news anchor in Los Angeles, a veteran radio and TV news reporter, NBC talk show host, former Tournament of Roses parade co-host, and a best-selling mystery author.

== Early career ==
Lange was born Dorothy Scafard in New York City and graduated from Merrimack College in North Andover, Massachusetts.

She moved to California in the mid-1960s to pursue a certification to be a school teacher.

One day in 1967, Lange, a model at the time, got into a line at a Buena Park, California shopping mall, because it appeared "they were giving something away." The something they were giving away turned out to be applications for two positions as "Ladybirds" on KABC radio. The lucky duo would become the first female traffic/weather reporters in this area to patrol in helicopters. Lange was one of two chosen. She got the 6 a.m.-to-9 a.m. segment and she was called "Dawn O'Day." Another applicant, a film studio secretary named Lori Ross, got the afternoon shift as "Eve O'Day." "The two women in their tight-fitting, silver-lamé jumpsuits paved the way for today's less-exploited women deejays and announcers," thus began Lange's career as a news reporter, spotting news and reporting traffic for KABC. In June 1967, Lange appeared as a contestant on What's My Line? with John Charles Daly as host along with panelists Bennett Cerf, Barbara Feldon, Arlene Francis and Martin Gabel. Her work with KABC Radio was the subject for the panel to guess.

== Career ==
Lange started in March 1971 as a weather forecaster for KNBC's weeknight newscasts (known at the time as KNBC Newservice), and later appeared on Sunday, a weekly features program on the station which she co-hosted with Tom Snyder, Paul Moyer and Ralph Story. In December 1976 Lange was promoted to news anchor, and co-anchored KNBC's various weeknight news programs through December 1998 alongside Moyer, Jess Marlow, John Schubeck, Jack Perkins, John Beard, Keith Morrison, and Chuck Henry. NBC News refers to Lange as the first woman to anchor a nightly newscast at an NBC-owned station. TV Guide said Lange was the first local newscaster to be paid $1 million per year. Lange also co-hosted NBC's network coverage of the Tournament of Roses Parade alongside Michael Landon; was the regular guest host of Tomorrow, with former KNBC colleague Tom Snyder; and a regular guest host of the Today show. She hosted the Grand Floral Parade of the Portland Rose Festival and won several Emmy Awards as well as serving as host of the primetime network broadcast ceremony. During the 1990-91 television season, Lange and screenwriter/TV producer Gail Parent co-hosted the Kelly and Gail talk show which aired on KNBC-TV. Lange began writing fiction and mysteries while still a news anchor, partially to relieve insomnia from working on the 11 pm newscast. In 1999, Lange returned to television and joined KCBS-TV to co-anchor the female-oriented newscast Women 2 Women alongside Catherine Anaya, Pamela Wright and former KABC-TV newscaster Ann Martin.

She left broadcasting in 2001 and has since been a full-time mystery novelist. The popular mystery fiction books include The Reporter, Dead File, and Graveyard Shift, featuring fictional TV news anchor Maxi Poole, plus Trophy Wife and Gossip.

In 2010, Lange was presented with the Golden Mike's Lifetime Achievement Award by the Radio and Television News Association of Southern California.

== Personal life ==
Lange was married to film director William Friedkin (1987–1990). She has one daughter, Kelly Snyder, and three grandchildren.
