= David Sheehan =

American television personality (1938–2020)

David Sheehan (March 31, 1938 – December 1, 2020) was an American broadcaster, interviewer, host and reporter. Starting in 1970 on CBS, Sheehan was a reviewer and interviewer covering movies and television on a daily local newscast. He went on to host three annual national specials: Summer Movie Magic, Holiday Movie Magic and Academy Awards Movie Magic. Sheehan worked the 1970s and early-1980s on CBS, moved to NBC from 1984-1994, and finished up his 34 years of daily newscasting back at CBS from 1994-2004. Sheehan was the author of the novel Before I Wake, published under the pen-name David Dury.

== Education ==
Sheehan's college education includes Ohio State University, University of Notre Dame and UCLA. Stanford University. Palo Alto California

== Career ==
In 1970, Sheehan was a daily newscaster on KNXT-TV (later KCBS-TV). Two years later (also on KNXT), he was the first television, film and stage commentator to host a television critique show, Biting The Hand. In 1975, he was the first local newsman to ever work for two networks simultaneously: America Alive! on NBC and The Big News on CBS. In 1979, he hosted and produced the first Pay-TV monthly series in history, Backstage in Hollywood on HBO, which originally premiered on CBS television in the mid-70s.

In the early 1980s, Sheehan produced and camera-directed Pippin (with Bob Fosse) starring Ben Vereen and Martha Raye-the first Broadway musical filmed by cameras during live stage performance, for Pay-TV, cable TV and home video.

Sheehan moved to KNBC in 1984. While at KNBC, he was the first local entertainment reporter to host and produce his own series of network specials, including "Macho Men of the Movies" (with Clint Eastwood, Sylvester Stallone and Arnold Schwarzenegger) and "Hollywood's Leading Ladies" (with Julia Roberts, Michelle Pfeiffer, Sharon Stone and Janet Jackson). Sheehan returned to KCBS-TV in 1994 and remained with the station until 2004.

Sheehan hosted three national annual specials: "Summer Movie Magic", "Holiday Movie Magic" and "Academy Awards Movie Magic", syndicated to over 250 stations through his Hollywood Close-Ups, Inc. production and distribution company.

== Theatre ==
David Sheehan was a producer-director of the West Coast Premiere of "An Albee Almanac" by Pulitzer Prize winning playwright Edward Albee, and the West Coast Premiere of "Little Murders" by noted cartoonist/playwright Jules Feiffer.

== Author ==
After college, Sheehan was a newspaperman with the United Press International syndicate, covering celebrities such as Frank Sinatra and his "Rat Pack" involvement in the 1960 John F. Kennedy presidential campaign.

His magazine writing for Esquire, Playboy, Mademoiselle, and Los Angeles Magazine included interviews with "Tropic of Capricorn" author Henry Miller, mental health pioneer Abraham Maslow, Gestalt Therapy founder Fritz Perls, and Zen interpreter Alan Watts. His articles on philosophers Michael and Dennis Murphy covered 'Human Potentiality Movement' at Big Sur's Esalen Institute and discussed psychedelic experience guided by Sheehan's interview subjects Timothy Leary and Richard ("Baba Ram Dass") Alpert.

== Personal life and death ==
Sheehan was the father of three children: Brian, Shannon and Kelly. In the later years of his life, Sheehan resided in Marina del Rey, California.

Sheehan revealed in June 2019 that he was diagnosed and successfully treated for small cell lung cancer a few years earlier. In late 2017, however, he was diagnosed with an aggressive form of prostate cancer. He died on December 2, 2020, at the age of 82.
