= Kyung Lah =

American journalist

- 나경
- Born: August 27, 1971 (age 54); Seoul, South Korea
- Education: University of Illinois at Urbana-Champaign
- Occupation: Journalist
- Employer: CNN
- Website: www.CNN.com

- Kyung Lah
- Hangul: 나경
- Hanja: 羅經
- RR: Na Gyeong
- MR: Na Kyŏng

Kyung I. Lah (Korean: 나경, Korean pronunciation: [na ɡjʌŋ]; born August 27, 1971) is a South Korean journalist and correspondent for CNN based in the United States.

== Early life and education ==
Lah was born in Seoul, South Korea, and grew up in Streamwood, Illinois, Lah graduated in 1989 from Hoffman Estates High School in Hoffman Estates, Illinois. She earned a bachelor's degree in broadcast journalism from the University of Illinois at Urbana-Champaign in 1993. She was also a writer for the school's Daily Illini newspaper.

== Career ==
Lah began her career in 1993 as a desk assistant and field producer at WBBM-TV in Chicago. In 1994, she became an on-air reporter for WWMT-TV in Kalamazoo, Michigan. In 1995, she joined KGTV-TV in San Diego as a reporter.

In January 2000, she returned to WBBM-TV as an on-air reporter.

In early 2003, Lah moved to Los Angeles to take a job at KNBC-TV in Los Angeles, where she was a morning reporter and a midday anchor. The Chicago Sun-Times reported at the time that Lah had turned down a "half-hearted (contract) renewal offer" from WBBM-TV.

Despite receiving high praise from management, Lah was allegedly fired from KNBC-TV in Los Angeles in March 2005 for an alleged affair. They were both married at the time and Lah's husband also worked for NBC in the Los Angeles area.

In late 2005, Lah joined CNN Newsource as a Washington, D.C.-based correspondent.

In November 2007, Lah became CNN's Tokyo-based correspondent. A Japanese interpreter always accompanied her. On June 27, 2012, Lah left her post in Japan for a position at the CNN bureau in Los Angeles.

Lah has written extensively about Japanese subculture, specializing in men who have married animated characters. As a result, she was criticized by some in the Japanese blogosphere.

== Personal life ==
Lah has declared that she holds a very strong South Korean identity. In a 2006 interview with Dynamic-Korea, she revealed that she "[thinks] about the larger question of being Korean every single moment."

== See also ==
- CNN
