= Colleen Williams =

American journalist

- Born: Colleen Ann Williams; March 6, 1955 (age 71); Winston-Salem, North Carolina, U.S.
- Education: Creighton University; University of Nebraska at Omaha
- Occupation: Journalist
- Television: WOWT; KPIX-TV; KCBS-TV (1983–1986); KNBC (1986–present)
- Children: 1

Colleen Ann Williams (born March 6, 1955) is an American journalist. She is a news anchor of KNBC Channel 4 in Los Angeles, currently serving on the 5 and 11 p.m. weekday broadcasts. She also reports on occasion for NBC News and MSNBC. Williams is one of the most-recognized anchors in the Los Angeles area, the second-largest media market in the United States. Williams once could be recognized for her trademark hairstyle which until the late 1990s included a prominent silver streak.

== Early life ==
Williams was born in Winston-Salem, North Carolina. An Air Force brat, she moved around the country throughout her childhood. She attended college at Creighton University in Omaha, Nebraska before finishing her bachelor's degree in education at University of Nebraska at Omaha.

== Career ==
Williams taught in the Omaha Public School system for a few years before starting her news career with WOWT in Omaha.

Williams joined KNBC in 1986 from cross-town rival KCBS-TV where she anchored the 5 p.m. news for three years, succeeding Connie Chung after she left for NBC News. Prior to her L.A. arrival at KCBS (which was then KNXT), Williams anchored at KPIX-TV, the CBS station in San Francisco, California.

Williams was particularly visible during the O. J. Simpson murder trial, which she covered for KNBC and MSNBC, co-anchoring a daily summary of the trial each evening. It was after the Simpson trial concluded that Williams succeeded long-time 11 p.m. anchor Kelly Lange. Lange left the station after 25 years to work briefly for KCBS-TV before leaving television entirely in 2001.

On August 29, 2009, Williams attended the 61st Emmy Awards at the Academy of Television Arts & Sciences in North Hollywood, California.

== Awards ==
Williams has received Golden mic awards:

- Coverage of the Chatsworth train crash
- NBC4's special "LA Riots: Rubble to Rebirth."
- Coverage of 1996 Atlanta Summer Games Centennial Park bombing

Williams was also awarded a Lifetime Achievement Award by the Radio & Television News Association.
