= KNBC =

Television station in Los Angeles

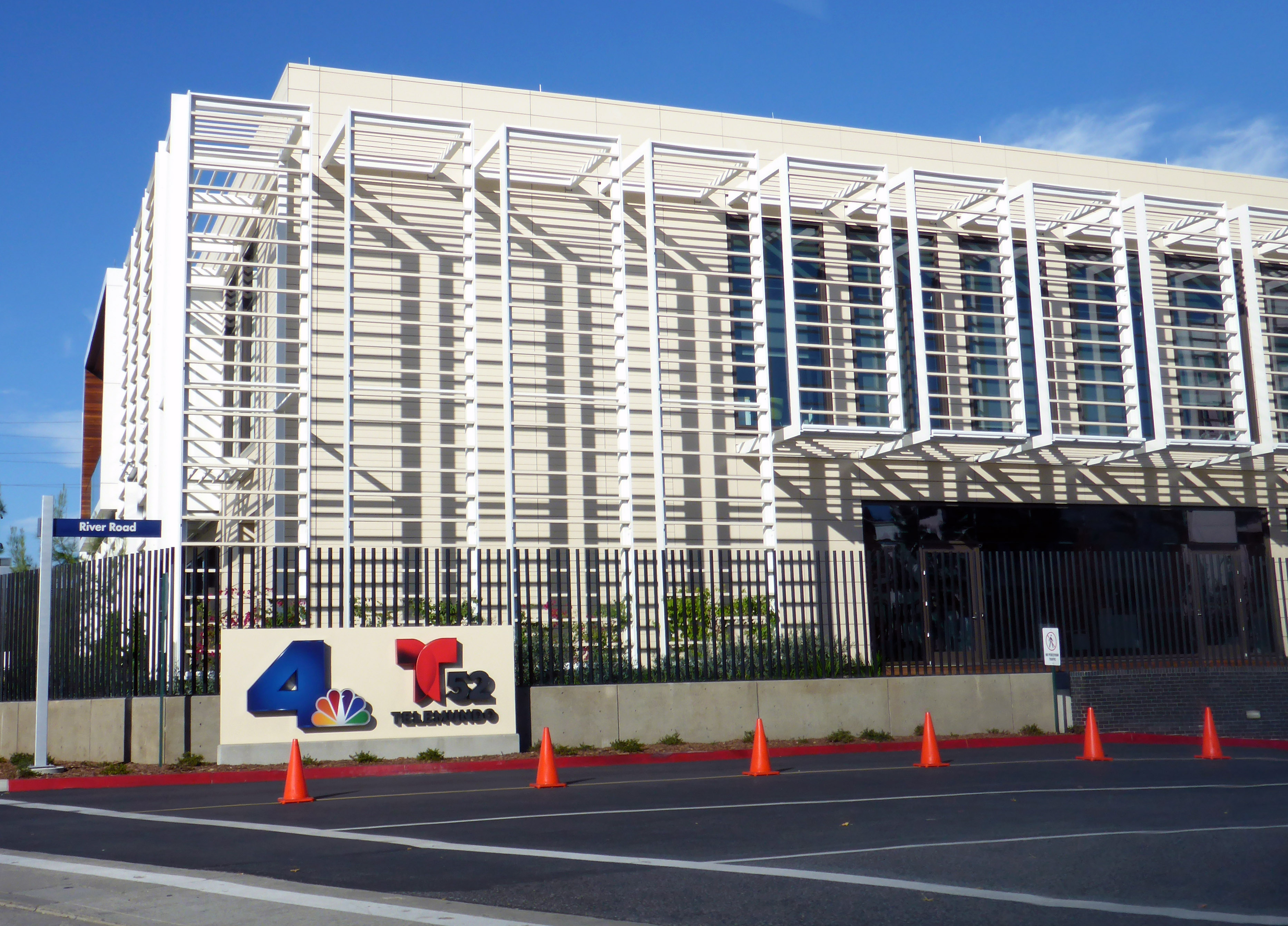
- Current studio building shared by KNBC and KVEA
- Los Angeles, California; United States
- Channels: Digital: 36 (UHF); Virtual: 4
- Branding: NBC 4 Los Angeles; NBC 4 News

Programming
- Affiliations: 4.1: NBC; for others, see § Subchannels

Ownership
- Owner: NBC Owned Television Stations; (NBC Telemundo License LLC)
- Sister stations: KVEA

History
- Founded: 1947
- First air date: January 16, 1949
- Former call signs: KNBH (1949–1954); KRCA (1954–1962); KNBC-TV (1986–1995)
- Former channel number: Analog: 4 (VHF, 1949–2009)
- Call sign meaning: National Broadcasting Company

Technical information
- Licensing authority: FCC
- Facility ID: 47906
- ERP: 665 kW
- HAAT: 991 m (3,251 ft)
- Transmitter coordinates: 34°13′32″N 118°3′55″W
- Translator(s): see § Translators

Links
- Public license information: Public file; LMS
- Website: www.nbclosangeles.com

KNBC (channel 4) is a television station in Los Angeles, California, United States. It is the West Coast flagship station of the NBC television network, owned and operated through its NBC Owned Television Stations division. Under common ownership with Corona-licensed Telemundo outlet KVEA (channel 52), the two stations share studio facilities at the Brokaw News Center in the northwest corner of the Universal Studios Hollywood lot off Lankershim Boulevard in Universal City; KNBC's transmitter is located on Mount Wilson.

== History ==
Channel 4 first went on the air as KNBH (standing for "NBC Hollywood") on January 16, 1949. It was the second-to-last VHF station in Los Angeles to debut, and the last of NBC's five original owned-and-operated stations to sign on. Unlike the other four, KNBH was the only NBC-owned television station that did not benefit from having a sister radio station. Though the NBC Radio Network had long been affiliated with KFI in Los Angeles, that relationship did not extend into television when KFI-TV (channel 9, now KCAL-TV) signed on in August 1948. When KNBH signed on, it marked the debut of NBC programs on the West Coast. Channel 4 originally broadcast from the NBC Radio City Studios on Sunset Boulevard and Vine Street in Hollywood.

The station changed its callsign to KRCA (for NBC's then-parent company, the Radio Corporation of America) on October 18, 1954. The call letters were changed again on November 11, 1962, when NBC moved the KNBC identity from its San Francisco radio station (which became KNBR) and applied it to channel 4 in Los Angeles. That call letter change coincided with the station's physical relocation from NBC Radio City to the network's color broadcast studio facility in suburban Burbank. NBC Color City, as it was then known, had been in operation since March 1955, and was at least four to five times larger than Radio City, and could easily accommodate KNBC's locally produced studio programming. NBC Radio's West Coast operations eventually followed channel 4 to Burbank not too long after.

=== KNBC ===
The station officially modified its callsign to KNBC-TV in August 1986, shortly after NBC and RCA were purchased by General Electric; the -TV suffix was dropped effective September 6, 1995.

On October 11, 2007, NBCUniversal announced that it would put its Burbank studios up for sale and construct a new, all-digital facility near the Universal Studios Hollywood backlot in Universal City, to merge all of NBCUniversal's West Coast operations (including KNBC, KVEA and NBC News' Los Angeles bureau) into one area. The studio opened on February 1, 2014. Shortly thereafter, NBCUniversal named the new broadcast center in honor of former KNBC and NBC News anchor/reporter Tom Brokaw, christened the Brokaw News Center.

In fall 2007 with the rollout of digital broadcasting, the station began airing a 24/7 newschannel News Raw on the .2 subchannel.

KNBC ended regular programming on its analog signal, over VHF channel 4, on June 12, 2009, as part of the federally mandated transition from analog to digital television. The station's digital signal remained on its pre-transition UHF channel 36, using virtual channel 4. Since the station qualified for the nightlight clause in the DTV Delay Act, it was required to keep its analog signal on for two weeks from June 12 to 26, 2009 to inform viewers of the digital television transition, consisting of a loop of digital transition public service announcements, while the digital channel was used for normal programming.

On January 1, 2014, Universal Sports transitioned into a cable- and satellite-exclusive service, causing its affiliates (such as KNBC) to replace the network and remove the channel from their digital signals entirely.

=== NBC California Nonstop ===
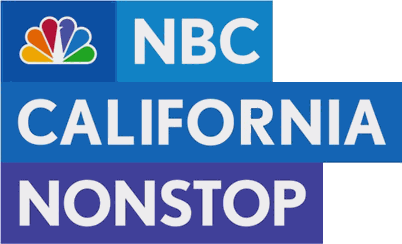
Logo for NBC California Nonstop.

KNBC operated NBC California Nonstop, a collaboration between KNBC and two other NBC-owned stations in California (KNSD in San Diego and KNTV in San Jose) which launched on May 3, 2011, and replaced programming from NBC Plus on the second digital subchannels of all three stations. In the case of KNBC, it was the second news-oriented digital channel operated by the station, as digital channel 4.2 featured a rolling news format under the name NewsRaw (which moved from digital channel 4.4 upon Weather Plus' shutdown on December 1, 2008), before the launch of California Nonstop. Each station produced a local newscast at 7 p.m. that was tailored to their respective market. For the Los Angeles feed of the channel, Colleen Williams anchored the hour-long Nonstop News LA. NBC California Nonstop ended on December 20, 2012, when Cozi TV was launched.

== Programming ==
=== Sports programming ===
The station has had a long history of carrying Los Angeles sports teams via NBC Sports. The station has had aired select Dodgers games from their arrival in Los Angeles in 1958 until 1989 and from 2026 onwards (and games featuring the California Angels from their establishment in 1961 to 1989 and from 2026 onwards) via NBC's Major League Baseball broadcast contract; this included the Dodgers' World Series victories in 1959, 1963, 1965 and 1988. Channel 4 was the station of record for the NFL's Raiders during their tenure in Los Angeles from 1982 to 1994, and also airs any Lakers and Clippers games that are part of the NBA on NBC from 1990 to 2002 and starting again in 2025. This included the Lakers championships in 2000, 2001 and 2002 and the team's appearance in 1991. Additionally, it served as the home station for the Rose Bowl Game in Pasadena from its first telecast in 1952 until 1988.

KNBC also provided local coverage of Super Bowl VII, which was hosted at Los Angeles Memorial Coliseum (and was the first Super Bowl televised in the host city), as well as Super Bowls XI, XVII, and XXVII, which were hosted at the Rose Bowl. Furthermore, the station provided local coverage of Super Bowl LVI, which was held at SoFi Stadium in Inglewood and won by the Rams. The first Super Bowl, which was also held at the Coliseum and broadcast on both NBC and CBS, did not air on KNBC or KNXT (channel 2, now KCBS-TV), due to the NFL's blackout policy of the time, which did not allow home telecasts of games regardless of whether they were sold out, including playoffs and the league championship game, and that policy extended to the host cities for the first six Super Bowls—Los Angeles, Miami (II, III, V), and New Orleans (IV and VI). The American Football League, before its merger with the NFL starting with the 1970 season, also had a similar home blackout policy to the NFL's, and starting with the 1973 season, home games were allowed to be televised in the local market, so long as the game sold out 72 hours in advance (the blackout rules were lifted completely in 2015). This allowed KNBC to televise any Los Angeles Rams inter-conference home games via NBC's AFC Sunday afternoon package if the game was sold out in advance; the first such game was the final home game of the 1973 season, as the Rams hosted the Cleveland Browns at the Coliseum on December 16.

Until 2021, the station aired select games involving the Los Angeles Kings and Anaheim Ducks via NBC's broadcast contract with the NHL, including Stanley Cup Final victories in 2007 for the Ducks, and 2012 and 2014 for the Kings. Today, KNBC carries any Rams and/or Chargers games that are chosen for NBC Sunday Night Football (the station previously aired any Rams home inter-conference games from 1973 to 1994 when NBC had the AFC broadcast package), including the Rams' victory in Super Bowl LVI (notably as the second NFL team to play in and win a Super Bowl at its home stadium, although the Rams were designated as the visiting team). It will also be the home station when Los Angeles hosts the 2028 Summer Olympics and will share the Universal Studios lot with international broadcasters covering the Games.

Since 2024, the station aired select college football games involving the UCLA Bruins and USC Trojans as part of Big Ten Saturday Night.

=== News operation ===
As of 2022, KNBC broadcasts 47 hours, 25 minutes of locally produced newscasts each week (with 8 hours, 5 minutes each weekday; three hours on Saturdays; and four hours on Sundays). The station's newscasts have historically more of a "serious" tone covering issues (such as politics, government, education, and the economy) than other Los Angeles area newscasts. In 2010, the Norman Lear Center at the University of Southern California found KNBC to have the least coverage of crime and the second-highest coverage of local government and sports and weather, compared to other Los Angeles stations. As part of a 2012 investment by parent company Comcast, KNBC's newscasts added 18 employees and produced more enterprise reporting. The station runs a special hour-long newscast on Sunday nights during the NFL season where NBC Sunday Night Football telecasts preempt the 6 p.m. newscast. On election nights, KNBC runs a special extended edition of its 11 p.m. newscast to show early election results.

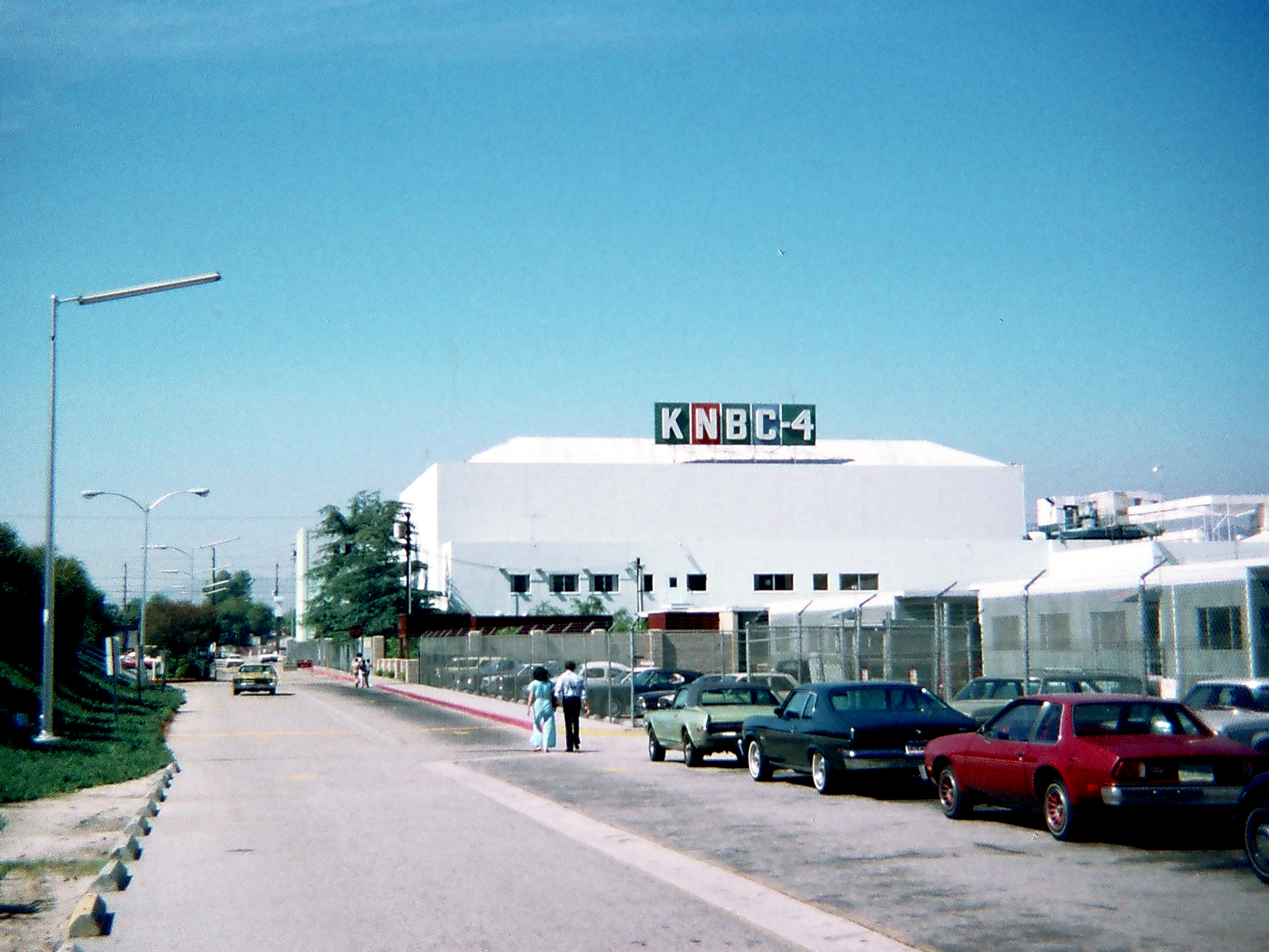
NBC Studios in Burbank, California, 1978.

In April 1968. channel 4 revamped its news programs into the KNBC News Service (stylized on the air as KNBC Newservice) which, when combined with the Huntley-Brinkley Report, comprised the first 2 1/2-hour-long block of early-evening local and national news on a major-market television station in the United States. The KNBC Newservice lasted until March 1976, when the newscasts adopted the NewsCenter 4 title. NBC made similar changes to newscasts in other markets around the same time, and channel 4 shared the NewsCenter branding with sister stations WNBC-TV in New York City, WRC-TV in Washington, D.C., and WMAQ-TV in Chicago. KNBC's newscasts were the last to drop the NewsCenter moniker, rebranding to News 4 LA in July 1982 as the station also launched a new hour-long newscast at 4 pm. The branding changed once more to Channel 4 News in August 1985. In October 1984, the station cut back its 6 p.m. newscast by 30 minutes. While KNBC became known on-air as NBC 4 in 1995, the Channel 4 News branding was so well established in Southern California that the title was retained for 26 years until 2011, when it became NBC 4 News.

For most of the last 50 years, KNBC has waged a spirited battle with KABC-TV for the top-rated local newscast in Southern California, which became a three-way contest with KCBS-TV's ratings resurgence in 2006. Throughout the late 1980s and into the early 2000s, KNBC's newscasts were the most-watched in the region, beating out every other station viewership-wise, which coincided with NBC's overall ratings at the time. Channel 4's 11 p.m. newscast currently sits in the first place (adults 25–54) and has been for nine months straight; most of the station's other newscasts, including its once-popular morning news program, Today in L.A., the area's first local morning newscast (which debuted in 1986), now is battling for second place.

For many years, KNBC produced a late afternoon newscast at 4 pm, which was dropped in 2002, in favor of Dr. Phil (that program moved to KCBS-TV in 2004, and was replaced by The Ellen DeGeneres Show through the end of the show's run in 2022). The station also had an hour-long 11 a.m. newscast, which later was trimmed to a half-hour before ultimately being canceled at the start of the 2010 Winter Olympics. The station revived its midday newscast as a half-hour program at noon in early 2012, which expanded to one hour that September. KNBC became the fifth station in the Los Angeles market to begin broadcasting its local newscasts in high definition on July 14, 2008 (Spanish-language sister station KVEA and former sister KWHY-TV also converted their newscasts to HD at the same time). On December 6, 2011, KNBC entered into a partnership with public radio station KPCC as part of a larger effort by NBCUniversal to partner with non-profit news organizations following its acquisition by Comcast.

In 2006, KNBC launched a local news channel on digital channel 4.4 called News Raw, that provided hourly news updates, additional information on breaking news stories, and previewed news stories scheduled to air on the main channel's newscasts. After Universal Sports was launched in 2008, News Raw became a part-time channel, and was later dropped when KNBC expanded Universal Sports programming on the former subchannel to 24 hours a day. Mekahlo Medina, the host of News Raw, has received national attention for his integration of social media into local newscasts.

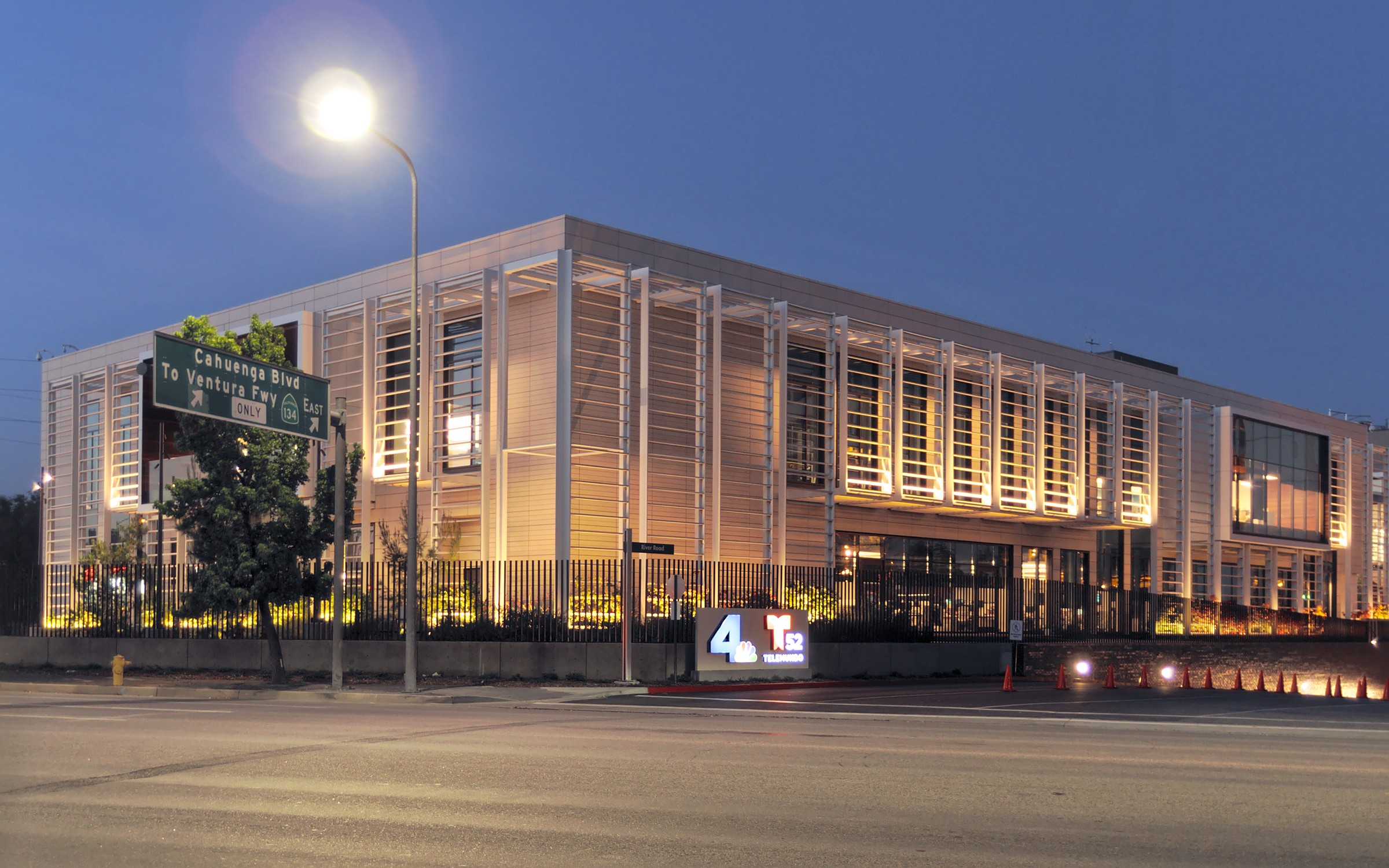
The Brokaw News Center, new location at the Universal lot, 2015

In summer 2016, changes were brought to KNBC's daytime lineup which led to the restoration of the 4 p.m. newscast, allowing the station to complete with KCBS-TV and its sister independent station KCAL-TV (which moved its 4 p.m. newscast from KCBS-TV in 2002) and KABC-TV (which began airing its 4 p.m. newscast into the period in September 1980). On July 24, 2016, KNBC became the tenth (and final) NBC-owned station and the third (and final) owned station in the West Coast to use its "Look N" graphics that is first implemented by the NBC O&Os in the East Coast in summer of that year; also its mic flags were updated, the color scheme was now blue with a white 4 instead of its white with a blue 4 color scheme; before this, KNBC along with sister stations KNTV and KNSD revamped their websites on July 1, 2016. In July 2016, KNBC entered into a partnership agreement with Cumulus Media—owned KABC radio to carry the simulcasts of the first half-hour of Today in L.A. morning newscasts and the station's 6 p.m. weeknight newscasts; additionally, some of the station's on-air talent occasionally appeared as guests on KABC's programs.

In January 2022, KNBC announced that they would launch a new streaming channel for NBCUniversal's streaming service Peacock, under the name of "NBC LA News"; this comes following the announcement they would have a simultaneous rollout of streaming news channels starting with its sister stations in Chicago, Miami, Philadelphia and Boston launching on January 20; the said channel was launched on March 17, 2022.

On September 12, 2022, KNBC premiered a new 30-minute 3 p.m. newscast, followed by the live East Coast edition of NBC Nightly News.

==== News team ====
KNBC has had a very stable news team over the years: weeknight anchor Colleen Williams (who also occasionally reports for MSNBC and NBC News) and sports anchor Fred Roggin (also has the nickname "The Dean of L.A. Sports" and serves as a commentator for NBC's Olympics coverage) have each been at the station at least thirty years or more. Former chief weathercaster Fritz Coleman (who like Roggin, has also occasionally appeared on The Tonight Show, and once hosted a late-night variety show for KNBC called It's Fritz from 1989 to the early 1990s) worked at the station from 1982 until his June 2020 retirement. Former anchor Paul Moyer worked two stints at channel 4; first from 1972 to 1979 (when he began a 13-year run at rival KABC-TV) and from July 1992 until his April 2009 retirement. Like Moyer, anchor Chuck Henry was also a mainstay at KABC-TV, before making the move to channel 4 in January 1994. Kelly Lange, Stu Nahan, John Schubeck, Tritia Toyota, Jess Marlow, David Sheehan, John Beard and Nick Clooney are other notables who have worked on KNBC's newscasts in the past. Another KNBC alum of note is consumer reporter David Horowitz, whose long-running syndicated series, Fight Back!, began on channel 4 and was produced and distributed by NBC and Group W.

Tom Brokaw began his NBC career as an anchor and reporter at KNBC in 1966, staying until he went over to national work for NBC News in 1973. Other notables who have worked at KNBC early in their careers prior to joining the network include Bryant Gumbel, Ross Porter, Pat Sajak, Kent Shocknek, Bob Abernethy, Keith Morrison and Tom Snyder.

===== Notable current on-air staff =====
Anchors

- Carolyn Johnson
- Robert Kovacik
- Kathy Vara
- Colleen Williams

Reporters

- Joel Grover – investigative reporter
- Conan Nolan – chief political reporter

===== Notable former on-air staff =====
- Bob Abernethy
- Andy Adler
- Jim Avila
- John Beard
- Ross Becker
- Victor Bozeman – staff announcer
- Tom Brokaw
- Jim Brown
- Nick Clooney
- Fritz Coleman
- Sonya Crawford
- David Cruz
- Linda Douglass
- Crystal Egger
- David Garcia
- Garrett Glaser
- Bryant Gumbel
- Daniella Guzman
- Chick Hearn – longtime Lakers announcer who worked previously as a sports anchor when station was known as KRCA
- Chuck Henry
- David Horowitz
- Desiree Horton
- Rafer Johnson – former Olympic track star who worked briefly as sports anchor
- Whit Johnson
- Kyung Lah
- Alycia Lane
- Kelly Lange – longtime news anchor
- Elita Loresca
- Jess Marlow – anchor (1966–1980, 1986–1997)
- Byron Miranda
- Robert W. Morgan
- Keith Morrison
- Paul Moyer
- Stu Nahan
- Warren Olney
- Jack Perkins
- Ross Porter
- Francis Gary Powers
- Jacob Rascon
- Donald Rickles – staff announcer
- Fred Roggin – sports director and anchor
- Michele Ruiz
- Pat Sajak
- Tracie Savage
- John Schubeck
- Bill Seward
- David Sheehan
- Kent Shocknek
- Tom Snyder
- Steve Somers
- Don Stanley – staff announcer
- Peggy Taylor – staff announcer
- Wendy Tokuda
- Tritia Toyota
- Danny Villanueva

== Incidents ==
On August 1, 1977, KNBC's "Telecopter", a Bell 206B piloted by former U.S. Air Force pilot, Francis Gary Powers, ran out of fuel and tried to land at Hollywood Burbank Airport. However, the helicopter would crash into a field near the Sepulveda Basin Recreation Area in Los Angeles, killing Powers and cameraman George Spears.

On August 13, 1987, during an afternoon newscast, a gun-wielding mental patient named Gary Stollman gained access to NBC Studios and took consumer reporter David Horowitz, along with newscasters John Beard and Kristie Wilde, hostage live on-air. With the gun pressed to his side, Horowitz calmly read the gunman's statements on camera. The man, identified as Gary Stollman, was caught with a toy gun, which was quickly confiscated by Beard after Stollman placed it on the news desk. Stollman was arrested by local police. It led Horowitz to start a successful campaign to ban "look-alike" toy guns in several states, including California and New York. A similar incident happened at the studios of KJEO-TV in Fresno, California, four months later on December 5, 1987.

In October 2003, a KNBC news team consisting of reporter Chuck Henry and his cameraman, Kristopher Li, were nearly killed in the field while shooting a report about California forest fires in the San Gabriel Mountains near Sylmar. Even though LAFD ordered that the news media to evacuate immediately, a sudden change in wind direction prevented Henry and his crew from doing so. Their news van had failed to start and firefighters rescued Henry and Li before the fires engulfed and destroyed the KNBC news van. KNBC reporter Kyung Lah interviewed Henry and Li shortly thereafter where the former tearfully recollected what they went through in the fire.

On September 15, 2026, while covering a fatal crash involving a Los Angeles Metro bus and SUV in Chatsworth, a KNBC helicopter operated by Angel City Air crashed, killing three people, including both occupants in the helicopter and a pedestrian in a parking lot. The crash also injured one other person on the ground. KNBC later identified that reporter Eliana Moreno and pilot George Marciniw were aboard the helicopter when it crashed. The crash is being investigated by the National Transportation Safety Board and the Federal Aviation Administration.

== Technical information ==
=== Subchannels ===
The station's signal is multiplexed:

Subchannels of KNBC
Subchannel	Res.	Short name	Programming
4.1	1080i	NBC4-LA	NBC
4.2	480i	COZI-TV	Cozi TV
4.3	480i	CRIMES	NBC True CRMZ
4.4	480i	Oxygen	Oxygen
13.3	480i	MOVIES!	Movies! (KCOP-TV)

Broadcast on behalf of another station

=== Translators ===
- K23PB-D Lucerne Valley
- K25QB-D Lucerne Valley
- K34EU-D Morongo Valley
- K25PL-D Ridgecrest
- K15FC-D Twentynine Palms
