= Jim Hill (broadcaster) =

American football player and sportscaster (born 1946)

- Born: October 21, 1946 (age 80); San Antonio, Texas, U.S.
- Occupation: Sportscaster
- Years active: 1976-present
- Football career

No. 39, 49
- Position: Cornerback

Personal information
- Listed height: 6 ft 2 in (1.88 m)
- Listed weight: 190 lb (86 kg)

Career information
- High school: Highlands (San Antonio)
- College: Texas A&I
- NFL draft: 1968: 1st round, 18th overall pick

Career history
- San Diego Chargers (1968–1971); Green Bay Packers (1972–1974); Cleveland Browns (1975)
- Stats at Pro Football Reference

James Webster Hill (born October 21, 1946) is an American sportscaster and former professional football player who is the lead sports anchor and sports director at KCBS-TV in Los Angeles. He played as a defensive back in the National Football League (NFL).

== Football career ==
Hill played college football at Texas A&I University (now Texas A&M University–Kingsville) for the Javelinas. He played in the NFL for the San Diego Chargers, Green Bay Packers, and Cleveland Browns.

== Broadcasting career ==
Hill started his broadcasting career in college, after a professor referred him to the general manager at KINE in Kingsville, Texas following a prank to get out of biology class. There, he was a disc jockey and talk show host. When he was selected by the Chargers, the station which carried them, KCST (now KNSD), wanted to be closer to Hill. Thus, his football number with the Chargers was 39, a reference to the channel number, and he hosted the music show Mr. 39's Talent Night, a program similar to American Bandstand, as well as sports reporting. He later moved on to KGTV, before moving to Green Bay.

During his first season as a Green Bay Packers player in 1972, Hill contributed to the Monday and Tuesday evening newscasts of Green Bay station WBAY-TV; as the primary affiliate of the CBS-TV Network in Green Bay at the time, WBAY-TV carried most Packers games during the 1970s.

After retiring from the NFL, Hill started in 1976 at KCBS-TV (then KNXT) in Los Angeles, where he was a sports anchor for 11 years. Hill began on the NFL on CBS in 1980 as an analyst. But in 1984, 1985, and 1992–93, he was the play-by-play announcer on selected games. He also served as Sideline Reporter for CBS Sports's coverage of Super Bowl XVIII (1984). He left KCBS in 1987, and spent a near five-year stint at rival KABC-TV, where he anchored the sports segments on its 5, 6, and 11 p.m. editions of Eyewitness News. He also worked for ABC Sports's coverage of the 1988 Winter Olympics as a Correspondent in Calgary and as Sideline Reporter for the Super Bowl XXII (1988). He returned to KCBS in March 1992, and has remained there since. In addition to KCBS-TV duties, Hill files sports reports for sister station KCAL-TV. Hill is also one of the hosts for pay-per-view boxing telecasts produced by the Showtime cable network.

A popular broadcast personality in Southern California for years, Hill has been active in community activities. He is a member of the Los Angeles Urban League's board of directors, as well as serving on the board of directors of the Grossman Burn Center in Sherman Oaks, California. He is a spokesman for the City of Los Angeles Department of Recreation and Parks and is involved in developing youth outreach and fitness programs.

== Personal life ==
Hill is an avid golfer who often plays at Wilson & Harding Golf Courses at Griffith Park in Los Angeles. He also plays golf with Ernie Camacho.

He was formerly married to Erma White (1965–1973). Hill has one son, Walter J. Hill. He is divorced from actress Denise Nicholas.

His younger brother is former Los Angeles Rams tight end David Hill.

He has appeared as himself in movies and television shows such as Rocky III and Arli$$.

== Partial filmography ==
- Polyester (1981) - Picket Reporter
- Rocky III (1982) - Sportscaster
