= KABC-TV =

Television station in Los Angeles

- Los Angeles, California; United States
- Channels: Digital: 7 (VHF), shared with KRCA; Virtual: 7
- Branding: ABC 7; ABC 7 Eyewitness News

Programming
- Affiliations: 7.1: ABC; for others, see § Subchannels

Ownership
- Owner: ABC Owned Television Stations; (KABC Television, LLC)

History
- Founded: 1947
- First air date: September 16, 1949
- Former call signs: KECA-TV (1949–1954)
- Former channel numbers: Analog: 7 (VHF, 1949–2009); Digital: 53 (UHF, 1998–2009)
- Call sign meaning: American Broadcasting Company

Technical information
- Licensing authority: FCC
- Facility ID: 282
- ERP: 28.7 kW; 50 kW (CP)
- HAAT: 978 m (3,209 ft)
- Transmitter coordinates: 34°13′37″N 118°4′1″W
- Translator(s): see § Translators

Links
- Public license information: Public file; LMS
- Website: abc7.com

KABC-TV (channel 7) is a television station in Los Angeles, California, United States. It is the West Coast flagship station of the ABC television network, owned and operated through its ABC Owned Television Stations division. KABC-TV maintains studios in the Grand Central Business Centre of Glendale, and its transmitter is located on Mount Wilson.

== History ==
=== KECA-TV (1949–1954) ===
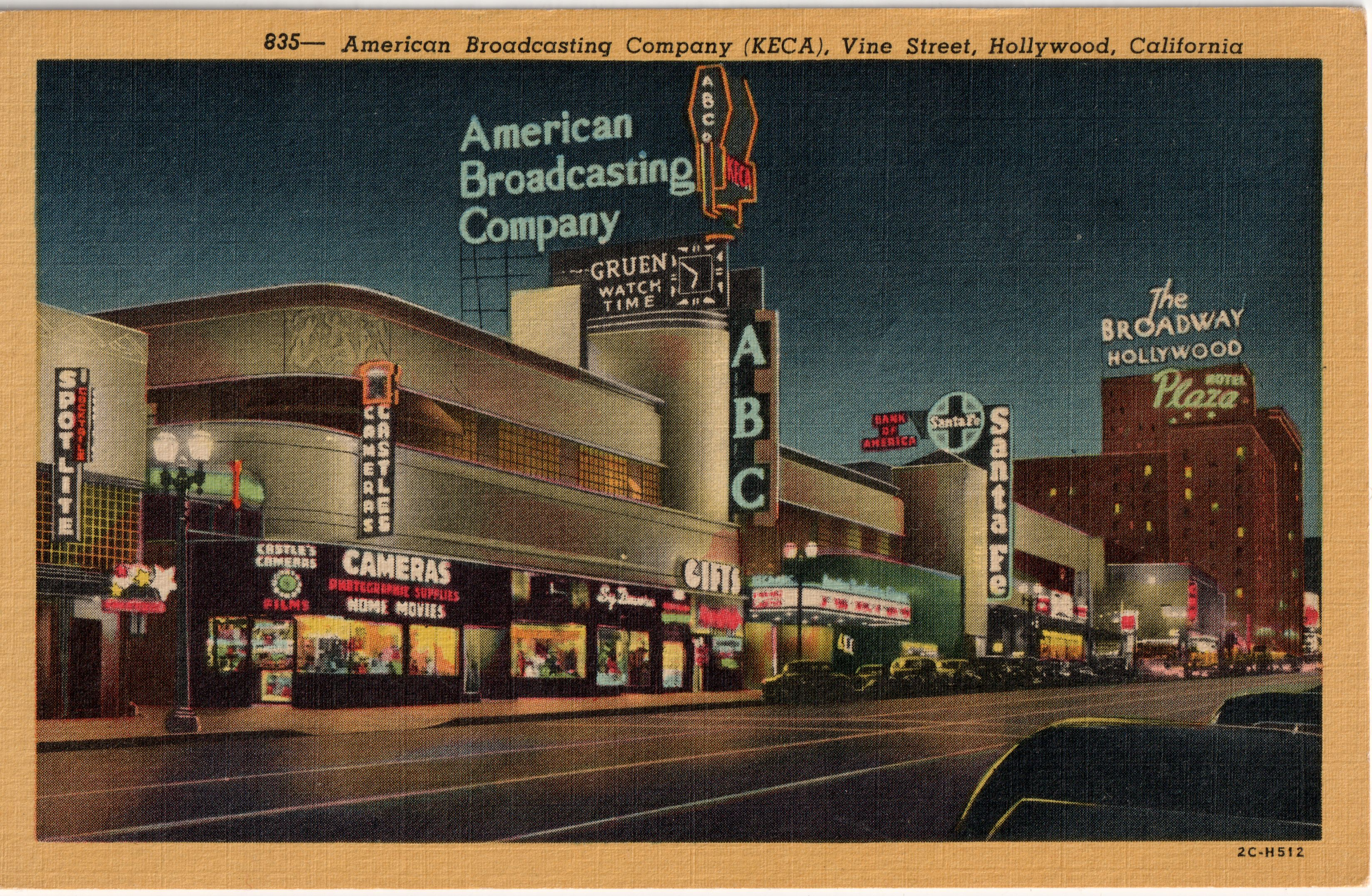
ABC radio and television KECA in about the 1950s

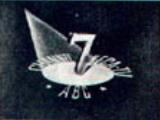
An early KECA-TV logo slide from the 1950s.

Channel 7 first signed on the air under the call sign KECA-TV on September 16, 1949. It was the last television station in Los Angeles operating on the VHF band to debut and the last of ABC's five original owned-and-operated stations to make its debut, after San Francisco's KGO-TV, which signed on four months earlier. It was also the last of the Los Angeles "classic seven" TV stations which were originally on the VHF dial, prior to the 2009 digital conversions. No other stations debuted in Los Angeles until 1958, when educational station KTHE operated briefly on channel 28, followed by the launch of the first two commercial UHF Los Angeles stations launched (KIIX [now KSCN-TV] and KMEX-TV, channels 22 and 34, respectively) in 1962.

The station's call sign was named after Los Angeles broadcasting pioneer Earle C. Anthony, whose initials were also present on channel 7's then-sister radio station, KECA (790 AM, now KABC). On February 1, 1954, KECA-TV changed its call sign to KABC-TV.

=== KABC-TV (1954–present) ===
Originally, KABC-TV was located at the ABC Television Center, now called The Prospect Studios, on Prospect Avenue in the Los Feliz neighborhood of Los Angeles, east of Hollywood. In 2000, KABC-TV moved to nearby Glendale into a new state-of-the-art facility designed by César Pelli, as part of the Disney Grand Central Creative Campus (GC3), in the Grand Central Business Centre on the site of the former Grand Central Airport. The station is currently located four miles (6 km) east (along the corridor of the Los Angeles River and the Ventura Freeway) of ABC's West Coast headquarters on the Walt Disney Studios lot in Burbank.

KABC-TV's logo from 2021 to 2026.

KABC-TV has used the Circle 7 logo since 1962 (the same year ABC created and implemented its current logo). In 1996, it augmented its bottom left quadrant of the Circle 7 with the ABC network logo. The station's news anchors and reporters wear Circle 7 lapel pins when they appear on camera, a practice that had once been standard at each of the original five ABC-owned stations.

On February 4, 2006, KABC-TV became the first television station in the state of California to broadcast its local newscasts in high definition using HD cameras in the studio and debuted an updated set.

KABC-TV shut down its analog signal, over VHF channel 7, at noon on June 12, 2009, as part of the federally mandated transition from analog to digital television. The station's digital signal relocated from its pre-transition UHF channel 53, which was among the high band UHF channels (52–69) that were removed from broadcasting use as a result of the transition, to its analog-era VHF channel 7. After the transition occurred, some viewers had difficulty receiving KABC's signal, despite operating at a high effective radiated power of 25 kW. On March 31, 2009, KABC-TV filed an application with the FCC to upgrade its signal strength to 28.7 kW. It was granted a construction permit on March 3, 2011.

In July 2010, The Walt Disney Company became engaged in a carriage dispute with Time Warner Cable. This dispute involved KABC-TV and three other ABC owned-and-operated stations, Disney Channel and the ESPN family of networks. If a deal had not been made, all of the Disney-owned channels would have been removed from Time Warner Cable and Bright House Networks systems across the United States. The companies reached a long-term agreement to keep the stations and their sister cable channels on Time Warner Cable and its co-managed systems on September 2, 2010. On August 31, 2023, Disney removed all of its channels, including KABC-TV, two other ABC-owned stations, and the ESPN networks, from Spectrum cable systems due to a carriage dispute, its first with the provider since 2010 when its predecessor, Time Warner Cable, was involved in a dispute with Disney. On September 11, 2023, the stations and their sister cable channels were restored by Charter Communications (the parent company of Spectrum) after the company and Disney reached an agreement. KABC-TV was then pulled from DirecTV on September 1, 2024, as a result of a dispute between the satellite provider and Disney. The removal came just hours before a USC Trojans college football victory over LSU airing on ABC.

Digital channel 7.3 previously carried programming from The Local AccuWeather Channel; it was replaced with a standard-definition feed of the Live Well Network in 2010. On April 15, 2015, the comedy network Laff replaced the standard-definition feed of LWN on 7.3. ABC Stations rebranded Live Well Network on .2 as Localish on February 17, 2020, to add an outlet for the Localish lifestyle content.

== Programming ==
=== News programming ===
KABC-TV's ABC 7 Eyewitness News logo, used until 2026.

KABC-TV currently broadcasts 48 hours, 55 minutes of locally produced newscasts each week (with 7 hours, 35 minutes each weekday; six hours on Saturdays and five hours on Sundays). KABC-TV formerly operated a news bureau in California's state capital of Sacramento, sharing resources with sister stations KGO-TV in San Francisco and KFSN-TV in Fresno; the bureau was closed in 2014. The station also has bureaus located within its viewing area, in Riverside and Orange. In the 1980s, the station also had a bureau located in Ventura.

Lew Irwin Reports, the station's first locally produced newscast, debuted in 1957. Initially, the 15-minute program was broadcast Monday through Saturday at 11 p.m. and featured Irwin delivering a news summary prepared by KABC Radio news writers, followed by a seven-minute feature written by Irwin that included footage shot for the program by the MGM-owned newsreel company Telenews. Irwin interviewed a host of public figures for the program, including former President Harry S. Truman, former Senator John F. Kennedy, philosopher Bertrand Russell, actor Marlon Brando, H-bomb scientist Edward Teller, and poets Robert Frost and Carl Sandburg. Irwin's features often included news-breaking investigations into such controversial topics as migrant workers, police brutality, proprietary hospitals, disc jockey payola, the Hollywood blacklist, and the John Birch Society. In a letter to the chief of ABC News, James Hagerty, in 1961, Sandburg wrote: "He is one of the great reporters in America today. I could make a case that he is one of the most useful citizens." In 1962, a new KABC-TV program director for the station mounted a second newscast on the station (following John Daly's network newscast in the early evening) presented by Ed Fleming, who had previously worked for rival KNXT. A few months later, he decided to feature Fleming and Irwin on both the early-evening and late-night newscasts, with Fleming delivering the news and Irwin a long-form feature. After numerous clashes between the program director and Irwin, Irwin resigned in 1962 citing creative differences. He was eventually succeeded by KCOP newscaster Baxter Ward, who was backed by the station's first staff film crew.

KABC-TV first adopted the Eyewitness News format for its newscasts in February 1969, not long after it became popular on New York City sister station WABC-TV. Like the other ABC-owned stations, KABC-TV used the "Tar Sequence" cue from the soundtrack of the 1967 film Cool Hand Luke as its theme music, and continued to use it even after other channels adopted an updated version of the theme, the Frank Gari-composed "News Series 2000". Later, the station used the original Cool Hand Luke theme only during the main newscast. The station's newscasts used a synthesized version of the old theme (composed by Frank Becker) during the mid-1980s. KABC-TV picked up the "News Series 2000" package first in 1989 for Eyewitness News promos, then in 1990 for additional use in bumpers and as the closing theme before being fully adopted as the Eyewitness News theme in 1992. The original Cool Hand Luke theme was retained for some Eyewitness News promos as late as 1993. In 1995, KABC began using Gari Media Group's "Eyewitness News" music package, which remains as the station's news theme.

Bill Bonds and Stu Nahan were KABC-TV's first anchor team under the Eyewitness News banner. Within two years, unable to upend the dominance of KNXT (now KCBS-TV)'s The Big News and Eleven O'Clock Report with Jerry Dunphy and KNBC's Newservice format, Bonds returned to his previous ABC assignment at WXYZ-TV in Detroit and Nahan became the station's lead sportscaster. A succession of anchors—Joseph Benti, Barney Morris, John Schubeck and Judd Hambrick—followed, but the newscast gained its greatest growth in August 1975 when KABC-TV hired Dunphy as its lead anchor, following his firing from KNXT. Though initially paired with newcomer John Hambrick, Dunphy later partnered with reporter Christine Lund, and that duo led KABC-TV to local news supremacy well into the 1980s. Others who have reported or anchored for KABC-TV include Lisa McRee, Harold Greene, Tawny Little, Laura Diaz, Paul Moyer, Chuck Henry, Johnny Mountain, George Fischbeck, Judd Rose, and Bill Weir. Former KABC-TV sports reporters and anchors include former NFL players Lynn Swann, Gene Washington, Jim Hill, and Bob Chandler; and former Major League Baseball player (and current Los Angeles Dodgers radio analyst and play-by-play announcer) Rick Monday.

In the highly competitive Los Angeles media market, Eyewitness News has long engaged in several initiatives to connect with local viewers and is quite beloved in Southern California for its "neighborhood news" approach. One such early effort was to originate a local newscast from a typical Southern California suburban family home. In the spring of 1972, a contest was held, asking the public to write letters telling KABC why an edition of the newscast should be produced at their home. The winner was Joseph Jensen from Sepulveda (now known as North Hills), and on June 13, the 11 p.m. edition of Eyewitness News originated live from the Jensen family dining room, with anchormen John Schubeck and Joseph Benti seated at the Jensen dinner table, reading the latest headlines. The Jensen family surrounded the journalists, dressed in their "Sunday best". Camera equipment, lights, microphones and a remote broadcast truck (similar to the ones used at sporting events), to connect the house to the ABC Television Center, were employed to help with the broadcast.

During the 1970s and 1980s, the station's newscasts often included spirited miniature debates and commentaries reflecting various political viewpoints. Several notable politicians and political pundits appeared on these segments, including Proposition 13 backer Howard Jarvis, former U.S. Representative and Senator John Tunney, Bruce Herschensohn, Bill Press and Baxter Ward. In addition, KABC-TV aired brief editorials from the station's general manager, most notably John Severino, who served throughout the 1980s. This practice was discontinued in 1990.

During the 1980s, KABC-TV was one of a few stations in the country to run a three-hour block of local newscasts on weekdays from 4 to 7 pm. The station was the first in the region to introduce an hour-long newscast at 4 pm, first anchored by Jerry Dunphy and Tawny Little in September 1980. Before this, the station ran two hours of news from 5 to 7 pm. The station reduced this block by one half-hour in 1990, when it moved World News Tonight from 7 p.m. to 6:30 pm. For a time in the late 1980s, its 6:30 p.m. newscast was titled Eyewitness Update and served as a final recap of the day's news, similar in nature to an 11 p.m. newscast. KABC-TV is one of three ABC stations on the West Coast to air World News at 6:30 p.m. (the two other ABC stations to do this being KGTV in San Diego and KAEF in Eureka); most other ABC stations in the western United States run the program at either 5:30 or 6 pm. When the network soap opera Port Charles ended its run in 2003, KABC-TV expanded its midday newscast to a full hour. Occasionally, KABC-TV has aired the live East Coast edition of World News Tonight at 3:30 pm.

From January 13, 2014, to July 28, 2022, KABC-TV produced an hour-long evening newscast on then-independent Anaheim-based KDOC-TV (channel 56); the newscast originally aired at 8 p.m. before moving to 7 p.m. and aired seven nights a week; KDOC also added a midnight rebroadcast of KABC's 11 p.m. newscast. KABC was the fifth ABC owned-and-operated station to enter into a news share agreement (after WTVD, KGO-TV, WPVI-TV and KFSN-TV). KABC aired its final news broadcast on KDOC on July 28, 2022, due to KDOC being sold to Tri-State Christian Television and switching to religious programming the next day.

On May 31, 2016, KABC added a 3 p.m. newscast on weekdays, competing with KTLA's newscast at that time slot. On September 10, 2018, KABC became the third television station in the market to expand its weekday morning newscast to three hours, with an additional half-hour at 4 a.m.

On September 30, 2015, the KABC-TV studios in Glendale were evacuated due to a bomb threat. The station's employees were evacuated and forced the station off-the-air; the suspect who was responsible for the threat was a 22-year-old Glendale man, who was arrested on October 14, 2015. As a result, the 4 p.m. newscast was temporarily moved outside the studio, while the police swept the studio with bomb-sniffing dogs inside. At 4:42 pm, the station's employees were allowed to re-enter the studio and the newscast continued from the studio after the threat.

In February 2017, the station's news helicopter, AIR7HD, received an upgrade and debuted with two new features: XTREME Vision and SkyMap7. XTREME Vision uses an advanced zoom lens and can track vehicle speeds in real time. SkyMap7 uses augmented reality technology which overlays the names of streets and highways onto the picture. Both features are powered by the SHOTOVER F1 Live.

==== Ratings ====
The introduction of the Eyewitness News format, followed by the addition of syndicated staples such as The Oprah Winfrey Show in 1986, Live with Kelly and Mark and its predecessors in 1991, and Jeopardy! and Wheel of Fortune in 1992, has allowed KABC-TV to maintain a substantial ratings advantage over its competition. Leveraging the strength of its sizeable lead-in at 3 p.m. by the now-defunct Oprah, KABC-TV has long held first or second in the ratings for its 4 to 6:30 p.m. news block. However, ratings leads for the morning and late news have typically been expensive battles with local stations KTLA and KTTV in the morning, and KNBC (and recently KCBS-TV) at 11 p.m.

KABC-TV led all local news time periods during initial coverage of the January 2025 Southern California wildfires.

==== Social media ====
KABC-TV, as well as the other Disney owned television stations, has a large presence on several social media platforms. In May 2014, KABC-TV claimed to be the first local TV station in the United States to surpass one million likes on Facebook.

==== Notable current on-air staff ====
===== Anchors =====
- Marc Brown – anchor
- David Ono – anchor

===== Weather =====
- Dallas Raines (AMS Certified Broadcast Meteorologist Seal of Approval) – chief meteorologist

==== Notable former on-air staff ====
- Jessica Aguirre
- Fred Anderson
- Rona Barrett
- Angela Black
- Bill Bonds
- Ashley Brewer
- Jann Carl
- Laura Diaz
- Todd Donoho
- Jerry Dunphy
- Dr. Dean Edell
- George Fischbeck
- Gary Franklin
- Dr. Lillian Glass
- Carlos Granda – general assignment reporter, retired
- Harold Greene
- John Hambrick
- Judd Hambrick
- Chuck Henry
- Bruce Herschensohn
- Brandi Hitt
- Desiree Horton
- J. J. Jackson
- Dana King
- Kelly Lange
- Pinky Lee
- Sam Chu Lin
- Bruce Lindsay
- Tawny Little
- Christine Lund
- Ann Martin
- Lisa McRee
- Rick Monday
- Jim Moret
- Johnny Mountain
- Paul Moyer
- Terry Murphy
- Stu Nahan
- Maila Nurmi
- Warren Olney
- Ron Olsen
- Indra Petersons
- Regis Philbin
- Bill Press
- William C. Rader
- Art Rascon
- Maggie Rodriguez
- Ric Romero
- Wayne Satz
- John Schubeck
- Tom Snyder
- Ralph Story
- Leslie Sykes
- Michelle Tuzee
- Baxter Ward
- Gene Washington
- Bill Weir

=== Sports programming ===
Owing to its common ownership with ESPN, KABC-TV became the designated broadcast home of Los Angeles Rams games in 2016 for the team's appearances on Monday Night Football. KABC-TV carries the Rams' Monday Night Football games from that year onward while other games are split between three other television stations: KCBS-TV through the NFL on CBS, including the network's Thursday night games (2014–2017), KNBC through NBC Sunday Night Football and NBC-produced Thursday night games (2016–2017), KTTV through the NFL on Fox and Fox-produced Thursday night games (2018–2021), and KTLA through Amazon Prime-produced Thursday night games (since 2022). The station also produces and broadcasts the Rams' team shows on Saturday nights during the regular season, with comedian Jay Mohr once serving as host for several weeks in 2016. The same broadcast schedule applies for the Los Angeles Chargers, after they relocated from San Diego in 2017.

The Chargers named KABC-TV the team's official English-language television broadcaster from 2017 to 2019, giving KABC-TV access to preseason telecasts and weekly magazines. In 2021, the Chargers moved their preseason broadcasts to KCBS-TV while the Rams moved their broadcasts to KABC-TV as part of a new partnership which also saw the station airing the coach's show on Saturday nights.

KABC-TV will serve as the host station for Super Bowl LXI in 2027 at SoFi Stadium in Inglewood.

In addition, KABC-TV carries NBA games involving the Los Angeles Lakers and the Los Angeles Clippers through the league's contract with the network. The station has carried the Lakers' 2004, 2008, 2009, 2010, and 2020 NBA Finals appearances, including the team's championship victories in 2009, 2010, and 2020. KABC-TV also aired the Lakers' inaugural NBA In-Season Tournament (now the NBA Cup) championship victory in 2023.

From 1976 to 1989 and from 1994 to 1995, KABC-TV aired MLB on ABC national broadcasts of select games involving the Los Angeles Dodgers and California (later Anaheim) Angels per the network's then broadcast rights with the league, in that capacity airing the Dodgers' victory in the 1981 World Series.

In its role as the local station for nationally aired NHL on ABC games from 1997 to 2004 and since 2021, it also airs select games featuring the Los Angeles Kings and Anaheim Ducks.

KABC-TV served as the home station for the 1984 Summer Olympics, which were held in Los Angeles.

The station also aired Los Angeles Wildcats games as part of ESPN's coverage of the revived XFL in early 2020 before the league suspended operations due to the COVID-19 pandemic.

=== Other locally produced programming ===
KABC-TV produces several local shows including Vista L.A. (which profiles Latino life in Southern California), and Eye on L.A. (which has been on the air in some form since the early 1980s). On weekends, the station airs Eyewitness Newsmakers, hosted by reporter Adrienne Alpert. The station produces sports shows under various names throughout the year, all formerly under the name ABC 7 Sports Zone, which formerly originated from the ESPN Zone in Anaheim: Rams Primetime Saturday airs following the network's telecasts of Saturday Night college football games; during the NBA season, the station airs Slam Dunk Saturday/Sunday following Saturday night and Sunday afternoon games. Most ABC 7 Sports Zone shows previously originated from local sports venues including the Los Angeles Memorial Coliseum in Exposition Park, the Rose Bowl in Pasadena, and Staples Center in Los Angeles, but shows are now produced from the station's Glendale studios. It is hosted by Rob Fukuzaki, and is joined during the basketball season by former Laker great Michael Cooper. The program is a spin-off of Monday Night Live, which aired on KABC-TV from 1989 until Monday Night Football left the network after the 2005 NFL season. That show was hosted by Todd Donoho until 1997, and later Bill Weir and Rob Fukuzaki and featured an extensive trivia contest.

Prior to ABC's annual telecasts of the Academy Awards, KABC-TV produces a live pre-awards show and post-awards show, On the Red Carpet at the Oscars, featuring red carpet interviews and fashion commentary. This show also airs on the network's other O&O stations and is syndicated to several ABC affiliates and other broadcasters outside the country. From 2010 to 2014, KABC spun the special off into a weekly entertainment news show, On the Red Carpet, hosted by Rachel Smith.

In the past, KABC-TV featured various locally produced shows such as AM Los Angeles; a morning talk show which at various times featured personalities Regis Philbin, Sarah Purcell, Ralph Story, Tawny Little, Cristina Ferrare, Cyndy Garvey, and Steve Edwards as hosts (Live with Kelly and Mark, formerly co-hosted by Philbin until 2011 and produced at New York sister station WABC-TV, now occupies the former time slot of AM Los Angeles). Edwards also hosted a short-lived afternoon show in the mid-1980s called 330, which aired after the ABC soap opera The Edge of Night.

On April 30, 1954, KABC-TV aired a preview program, Dig Me Later, Vampira, hosted by Maila Nurmi at 11 p.m. The Vampira Show premiered on the same night. For the first four weeks, the show aired at midnight, and it moved to 11 p.m. on May 29. Ten months later, on March 5, 1955, the series began airing at 10:30 pm. As Vampira, Nurmi introduced films while wandering through a hallway of mist and cobwebs. Her horror-related comedy antics included talking to her pet spider Rollo and encouraging viewers to write for epitaphs instead of autographs. When the series was cancelled in 1955, she retained rights to the character of Vampira.

In 1964, Pinky Lee attempted a return to kids television by hosting a local children's comedy program on KABC-TV. The series was also seen in national syndication from 1964 to 1965. But the program fell prey to creative interference from the show's producers and from station management. Lee tried to fight off the creative interference, but his efforts were for naught. The 1960s version of The Pinky Lee Kids TV Show went off the air after one season.

The station also served as the official host broadcaster of the Kingdom Day Parade in Crenshaw and Leimert Park.

== Technical information ==
=== Subchannels ===
Subchannels of KABC-TV and KRCA
License	Subchannel	Res.	Short name	Programming
KABC-TV	7.1	720p	KABC-DT	ABC
KABC-TV	7.2	480i	LOCLish	Localish
KABC-TV	7.3	480i	CHARGE!	Charge!
KABC-TV	7.4	480i	QVC2	QVC2
KRCA	62.1	720p	KRCA-DT	Estrella TV
KRCA	62.2	480i	KRCA-2	Estrella News
KRCA	62.3	480i	CONFESS	Confess

=== Translators ===
- K21MH-D Daggett
- K26MW-D Lucerne Valley
- K27ON-D Lucerne Valley
- K30QC-D Ridgecrest

== See also ==
- Circle 7 logo
- KABC (AM)
- KLOS-FM (formerly KABC-FM)
