= Good Day L.A. =

Morning television news and entertainment program in Los Angeles

- The blue variation of the Good Day L.A. logo was introduced on March 26, 2018
- Genre: Morning news
- Presented by: Brooke Thomas (2021–present); Amanda Salas (2017–present); Maria Quiban (2011–present); Araksya Karapetyan (2012–2017; 2018–present); Soumada Khan (2016-present); Stu Mundel (2020–present); Sandra Endo (2022–present); Jennifer Lahmers (2023–present); Bob Decastro (2023–present)
- Theme music composer: Frank Gari
- Opening theme: "Good Day" by Gari Media Group
- Country of origin: United States
- Original language: English

Production
- Executive producers: Josh Kaplan; Hayley Herst
- Production locations: Fox Television Center, South Bundy Drive, West Los Angeles, California
- Camera setup: Multi-camera
- Running time: 360 minutes
- Production company: Fox Television Stations, Inc

Original release
- Network: KTTV
- Release: June 18, 1993 – present

Good Day L.A. is an American morning television news and entertainment program airing on KTTV (channel 11), a Fox owned-and-operated television station in Los Angeles, California, owned by the Fox Television Stations subsidiary of Fox Corporation. The program broadcasts each weekday morning from 5 a.m. to 11 a.m. Pacific Time. The program features news, traffic, weather, and entertainment segments (including celebrity interviews, which are mainly done in studio, but occasionally via satellite). The program also features weekly segments on finance, tech, wellness, and food.

== History ==
Good Day L.A. debuted on June 18, 1993. At its inception, it was a two-hour newscast utilizing the then-traditional "overnight headlines and traffic/weather" morning news format, originally anchored by Antonio Mora and Susan Lichtman. Mark Thompson moved from the station's 10 p.m. newscast to serve as its weather anchor; Dagny Hultgreen served as the entertainment anchor; and Suzanne Dunn was the traffic reporter, reporting from the station's news helicopter Sky 11 (now SkyFox). A weekend public affairs show with the same name aired during the 1980s.

The format was unsuccessful, and the show had suffered from frequent anchor turnover. Mora left for ABC News and was replaced by Thompson and later Tony McEwing (who has anchored the early morning Fox 11 Morning News since its 1993 launch). Hultgreen was replaced by Lonnie Lardner, and Dunn was replaced by Will Kohlschreiber.

The show was retooled in March 1995 when Steve Edwards was brought in as anchor alongside Jillian Barberie as weather anchor (swapping positions with Thompson, who returned to reporting weather on the station's 10 p.m. newscast), and Dorothy Lucey handling the entertainment reports; Rod Bernsen took over the traffic reports from the helicopter, and McEwing reported headlines from the newsroom.

In mid-2012, the show saw its first major lineup change in nearly two decades with the departure of Lucey, whose contract was not renewed after 17 years in May. Around the same time, Barberie was offered to work on a freelance basis and appeared less frequently. Unsatisfied with the demotion, Barberie left in September of that year. At the same time of Barberie's exit, Maria Sansone was made a full-time co-host alongside Edwards. The two were later joined by Araksya Karapetyan as a third host/anchor with regular contributions from Lisa Breckenridge, Marla Tellez, and Tony McEwing.

Breckenridge and Sansone were let go in January 2017. For a short period, the broadcast was hosted by Edwards and Karapetyan before the latter was moved to the station's early morning newscast. Liz Habib then joined as the show's new co-anchor. On December 4, 2017, Megan Colarossi joined the show, replacing Habib as the new co-anchor alongside Edwards, who returned as a sports anchor. The teaming lasted just one week, as Edwards was let go by KTTV.

=== Good Day Live ===
In 2001, Good Day L.A. spun off a nationally syndicated program called Good Day Live, an hour-long version of the local show with the same hosts; the program, which featured the same format as Good Day L.A. (although with more of an emphasis on entertainment news, interviews, and feature stories rather than news headlines), was distributed by 20th Television and was originally launched on the Fox Television Stations, the parent of KTTV which operates Fox's owned-and-operated stations. Jillian Barberie was fired and Dorothy Lucey left the syndicated version in 2004, yet both continued to host the L.A.-based version. They were replaced by Arthel Neville and Debbie Matenopoulos. Good Day Live was canceled a year later due to low ratings.

=== Expansion to three hours ===
Following the cancelation of Good Day Live, KTTV expanded Good Day L.A. to three hours, running until 10 a.m. local time (becoming the first Fox-owned station, and one of the earliest stations not affiliated with the Big Three networks, to expand their morning newscast into the 9 a.m. hour). Also in 2005, Good Day L.A. added a Sunday edition hosted by Robb Weller, Nischelle Turner and Elizabeth Espinosa (in July 2006, the Good Day L.A. branding was removed from the Sunday edition and the format was changed to a more straightforward newscast; Turner and Espinosa were reassigned to other news programs, but Weller remained and co-anchored the Sunday morning newscast with Gina Silva until that program was cancelled at the end of the decade).

=== Expansion to five and a half hours ===
KTTV expanded Good Day L.A. to five and a half hours on December 10, 2018, incorporating the early morning newscast that began at 4:30 a.m. into the show. The 4:30 a.m. to 7:30 a.m. portion is anchored by Araksya Karapetyan & Tony McEwing. The 7:30 a.m.-10a.m. portion is hosted by Elex Michaelson, Megan Colarossi, Rita Garcia, Vanessa Borge, weather anchor Maria Quiban, entertainment reporter Julie Chang, and traffic reporters Rick Dickert and Soumada Khan.

On March 4, 2019, Good Day L.A. changed its anchor lineup. The 4:30 a.m. to 6 a.m. portion is hosted by Dan Cohen and Rita Garcia; the 6 a.m. to 9 a.m. portion is hosted by Araksya Karapetyan and Tony McEwing; and the 9 a.m. to 10 a.m. portion is hosted by Megan Colarossi and Vanessa Borge.

=== Expansion to six hours ===
KTTV expanded Good Day L.A. to six hours on Monday, April 1, 2019 from 5 a.m. to 11 a.m. P.D.T., Pacific Daylight Time.

=== Expansion to seven hours ===
KTTV expanded Good Day L.A. to seven hours in Tuesday, September 6, 2022 from 4 a.m. to 11 a.m. P.D.T., Pacific Daylight Time.

=== Reduction to six hours ===
KTTV reduced Good Day L.A. to six hours on Monday, June 1, 2026 from 5 a.m. to 11 a.m. P.D.T., Pacific Daylight Time.

== Notable personalities ==
=== Current on-air staff ===
==== Anchors ====
- Araksya Karapetyan: 9 a.m.–11 a.m. host/reporter on KTTV FOX 11, 11 a.m.–12 p.m. Midday L.A. host/reporter on the Fox 11 Plus, KCOP-TV Channel 13.
- Soumada Khan: 5 a.m.–7 a.m. weather and traffic anchor / 7 a.m.–10 a.m. traffic anchor
- Jennifer Lahmers: 7 a.m.–9 a.m. host/reporter
- Stu Mundel: SkyFox reporter & Photographer
- Maria Quiban: 7 a.m.–11 a.m. weather/social media anchor on KTTV FOX 11, 11 a.m.–12 p.m. Midday L.A. host/reporter on the Fox 11 Plus, KCOP-TV Channel 13.
- Amanda Salas: entertainment anchor
- Brooke Thomas: 5 a.m.–7 a.m. host/reporter
- Bob DeCastro: 5 a.m.–9 a.m. host/reporter
- Sandra Endo: 9 a.m.–11 a.m. host/reporter on KTTV FOX 11, 11 a.m.–12 p.m. Midday L.A. host/reporter on the Fox 11 Plus, KCOP-TV Channel 13.

==== Reporters ====
- Gigi Graciette : field reporter
- Mario Ramirez: field reporter
- Christina González: field reporter
- Christy Fajárdo: field reporter

=== Former on-air staff ===
- Dan Cohen: host
- Steve Edwards: host and news/opinion anchor
- Dorothy Lucey : co-host/entertainment reporter
- Lisa McRee : fill-in anchor
- Jillian Barberie : co-host/weather anchor
- Lauren Sánchez : entertainment reporter (now wife of Jeff Bezos)
- Maria Sansone : co-host and news anchor
- Mark Thompson : weather reporter
- Elex Michaelson: co-host and news anchor (now of CNN)
- Megana Colaroussia: co-host/reporter
- Julie Chang: entertainment anchor
- Rick Dickert: weather/traffic anchor
- Tony McEwing: host/reporter
- Rita Garcia: host/reporter
- Vanessa Borge: host/reporter
- Michaela Pereira: host/reporter
- Melvin Robert: host/reporter (now entertainment reporter, KTLA)

== KTTV morning newscasts ==
The station's early morning newscast, Fox 11 Morning News, premiered alongside Good Day L.A. in June 1993; it was originally anchored by Diana Koricke and Tony McEwing, with veteran KTTV reporter and former anchor Tony Valdez serving as an occasional fill-in anchor. Koricke left television news in June 1996 and was replaced on the broadcast by Jean Martirez (who joined the station from KCNC-TV in Denver). The show originated as an hour-long newscast beginning at 6 a.m., but was later expanded to 90 minutes, with a 5:30 a.m. start time. In 2004, an additional half-hour was added, expanding the morning newscast to two hours beginning at 5 a.m. (long after many other stations around the country, particularly in markets as large as Los Angeles, expanded their morning newscasts into the 5 a.m. slot). The morning newscast was expanded to 4:30 a.m. in April 2010.

On July 14, 2008, KTTV debuted a half-hour late morning newscast that immediately follows Good Day L.A. at 10:00 a.m. The program is currently anchored by McEwing and Araksya Karapetyan. In December of that year, a half-hour noon broadcast debuted on the station, which was reformatted in September 2011 from a traditional midday newscast to a mix of news and features with Good Day anchors Edwards and Sansone brought in to anchor the broadcast.

In December 2018, Good Day L.A expanded from a three-hour show starting at 7 a.m. to a five-and-a-half-hour show starting at 4:30 a.m.

On April 1, 2019, Good Day L.A. expanded to a six-hour show starting at 4 a.m.

In September 2022, Good Day L.A. expanded to a seven-hour show, running from 4 a.m. to 11 a.m.

On Monday, June 1, 2026, Good Day L.A. cancelled 4 a.m., reduced to six-hour show, running from 5 a.m. to 11 a.m.

== Reception ==
Critics of Good Day L.A. have praised the show for being "so wonderfully bonkers", particularly in comparison with its competition, including KTLA's morning newscast as well as the national network morning shows seen on ABC, CBS, and NBC.

== In other media ==
Clips from Good Day L.A. are frequently shown on the E! comedic television roundup series The Soup. The show features their logo and often showcases interviews or funny moments either in studio or from the field. Clips from this show have appeared on late night talk shows like The Tonight Show and Jimmy Kimmel Live!

== See also ==
- Good Day New York: a similar morning news and entertainment program on sister station WNYW in New York City, New York.
- KTLA Morning News: a competing morning news program on Los Angeles CW affiliate KTLA
- Today in L.A.: a competing morning news program on Los Angeles NBC owned-and-operated station KNBC
- Today in New York: a similar morning news program on New York NBC owned-and-operated station WNBC
