= Rabbit Bites =

Internet video series

Rabbit Bites is an Internet video series created by Nicholas Quixote in July 2006. It is featured each week on the cover of the online magazine Salon. The show has been airing on the website since January 2007 and stars two rabbits: Buns, a gray male rabbit, and Chou Chou, a black and white female rabbit.

== Overview ==
The internet show stars Buns (a brown dwarf rabbit) and Chou Chou (an English Lop), two rabbits who critique popular culture from the chairs in their living room. Rabbit Bites began as a good-natured yet harsh critique of the current state of Internet video and vlogging in particular. Rabbit Bites has satirized many of the video creators who were central in popularizing the web video on which it originally focused. After 6 months, Rabbit Bites started to examine popular culture and give opinions in the rabbits' typical "biting" style. Buns and Chou Chou have covered topics ranging from television shows, such as American Idol and To Catch A Predator, to celebrities, such as Tom Cruise and Britney Spears, and general pop culture topics, such as the iPhone. Now, Rabbit Bites continues in this format as a social critique, particularly of celebrity, attitudes about wealth and luxury, and the death of culture.

The show also has two additional components in some episodes. Chou Chou has her own show called Coffee With Chou. It's a talk show with Chou Chou as the host and Buns as the sidekick. Chou Chou has done real interviews with author Andrew Keen and blogger Robert Scoble, as well as fake interviews created by editing previous interview footage with celebrities. Chou Chou has done interviews in this style with stars such as Paris Hilton and Eli Roth. Since the show began, real guests include David Alan Grier, William Redpath, Greg Fitzsimmons, Dana Snyder, Bobby Lee, Tom Papa, Michael Ian Black, Jane Lynch, Carbon Silicon, Patton Oswalt, Janeane Garofalo, and the band They Might Be Giants.

The third component of the show is a "man on the street" segment, in which the rabbits ask one of their correspondents to go out and seek responses from the public. The first of these was done by Nalts, who is popular on YouTube, in regards to finding out about Generation Y and its need for praise.

== Philosophical and historical references ==
Although the show is mostly a critique of pop culture, it does contain some hidden meanings and references to art and history. Plato's Allegory of the Cave has been referenced in two episodes. An older one about the podcast "Amyville", and a more recent one about horror films, such as Hostel and Saw. In an episode about the infamous Alec Baldwin voicemail message, Buns and Chou Chou talk about how the camera obscura is present in life. An early episode about Robert Scoble features paintings by Piet Mondrian. An early episode about The Long Tail features the Tower of Babel. Two episodes feature the idea and significance of mirror images. An episode covering CSI features mirror images in a painting by Vermeer. Also, an episode covering blogger Ryanne Hodson features the rabbits mentioning mirror images when Hodson holds a stained glass piece that is made to look like her.

== In the media ==
In addition to being featured each week on Salon, the show has been featured on the YouTube homepage, as well as the Yahoo! Video homepage. The show has won The 9 on Yahoo! twice and has been featured in the British newspaper The Guardian. Amanda Congdon covered the show and interviewed Buns, Chou Chou, and Quixote on her series Amanda Across America, and the show has also been mentioned in the New York Times as being "twisted and sublime".
