= Agoura High School =

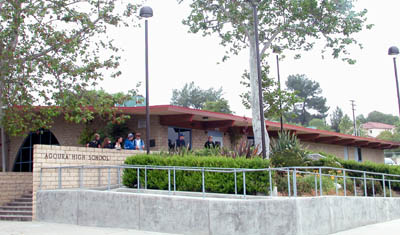
- Agoura High School

Location
- 28545 West Driver Avenue; Agoura Hills, California 91301; United States; 34°9′1″N 118°44′55″W

Information
- Type: Public
- Established: 1964 (62 years ago)
- School district: Las Virgenes Unified School District
- Principal: Garrett Lepisto
- Teaching staff: 74.18 (FTE)
- Grades: 9-12
- Enrollment: 1,728 (2023–2024)
- Student to teacher ratio: 23.29
- Colors: Blue and Gold
- Athletics conference: CIF Southern Section; Marmonte League
- Mascot: Big Daddy Bolt
- Nickname: Chargers
- Accreditation: WASC (2002–2008)
- National ranking: 1173
- SAT I average: 1730 (out of 2400)
- Newspaper: The Charger
- Yearbook: The Quixotian
- Website: www.agourahighschool.net

Agoura High School is a public high school in Agoura Hills, California, United States. It is the largest high school in the Las Virgenes Unified School District.

== Athletics and activities ==
Agoura High School's athletic teams are nicknamed the Chargers. The school competes in the Marmonte League of the CIF Southern Section. From 2018 to 2020, Agoura was in the Coastal Canyon League.

== Curriculum ==
In 2009, Agoura High School introduced the International Baccalaureate program to its curriculum. They offer many Advanced Placement classes. They also have P.E.

== Notable alumni ==
- Justin Berfield, actor known for Malcolm in the Middle
- Rob Bourdon, cofounder of the band Linkin Park
- Johnathan Cabral, track athlete
- Adrianna Costa, television personality
- Noah Centineo, actor
- Jensen Daggett, actress
- Tara Davis-Woodhall, track athlete, 2024 long jump Olympic gold medalist
- Brad Delson (born 1977), musician and record producer; lead guitarist and cofounder of the band Linkin Park
- Jonny DeLuca, MLB outfielder
- Ty Dieffenbach (born 2005), college football quarterback for the UCLA Bruins
- Kerry Ehrin, screenwriter and producer
- Doug Emhoff, entertainment lawyer, Second Gentleman of the United States and husband of U.S. Former Vice President Kamala Harris
- Chelsey Goldberg (born 1993), ice hockey player
- Heather Graham, actress
- Suzanne Krull, actress
- Stephan Hicks, NBA G League basketball player
- A.J. Holmes, Broadway actor
- Adena Ishii, Mayor of Berkeley
- Deena Kastor (born 1973), runner; American record holder for marathon and half marathon.
- Savy King, soccer player
- Hayley Kiyoko, actress/musician
- Jonathan Lipnicki (born 1990), actor
- Clay Matthews III, NFL player for the Green Bay Packers and Los Angeles Rams
- Matthew Mercer, voice actor and dungeon master on Critical Role
- Elex Michaelson, LA-based television journalist and host of The Story Is with Elex Michaelson, on CNN
- Olivia Olson, singer, songwriter, actress and voice of Marceline on Adventure Time
- Jonathan Rado, musician, member of Foxygen, producer, Grammy winner, actor
- Kario Salem, television, film, and stage actor and screenwriter
- Mike Shinoda, cofounder of the band Linkin Park
- Dave Siegler (born 1961), professional tennis player
- Shane Stanley, film producer/director
- Todd Steussie, NFL player for the Minnesota Vikings, Carolina Panthers, Tampa Bay Buccaneers, and St. Louis Rams
- Robert Stock (born 1989), MLB baseball pitcher
