= Martirez =

Martirez is a surname. Notable people with the surname include:

- Jean Martirez (born 1963), Filipino-American television journalist
- Raul Martirez (1938–2024), Filipino Catholic prelate and bishop
- Yoyong Martirez (1946–2024), Filipino basketball player

== See also ==
- Martínez (surname)
- Trece Martires, e facto capital of Cavite, Philippines
