= Laura Diaz (TV anchor) =

American newscaster

- Born: February 16, 1958 (age 68); Santa Paula, California, U.S.
- Education: California Polytechnic State University
- Occupation: Newscaster
- Years active: 1983–present

Laura Diaz (born February 16, 1958) is an American newscaster on KTTV Fox 11 in Los Angeles. She began working for the Fox station in May 2012. She had served as solo anchor of the weekday editions of KCBS-TV's CBS 2 News at 6 pm from April 2010 until she left the station. She produced and hosted some Eye on Our Community specials for CBS2. Prior to KCBS-TV. Diaz was a lead anchor at ABC7 in Los Angeles. She was the first Mexican-American to hold a lead anchor position at a Southern California English-language television station.

== Early life and career ==
Diaz, a first generation Mexican-American, was born in Santa Paula, a small community in Ventura County, California. Her family moved to the Santa Clarita Valley when she was four years old. She is Roman Catholic.

Diaz graduated from Hart High School in Santa Clarita before moving to San Luis Obispo, California to attend California Polytechnic State University (Cal Poly SLO), where she earned a Bachelor of Arts degree in English. Her first job in television was at KSBY in San Luis Obispo, followed by one at KFSN in Fresno. She returned to Southern California in 1983 as a reporter for KABC-TV at the station's bureau in Orange County. She covered several major stories as a reporter at KABC-TV, including the 1986 Los Angeles Central Library Fire, the 1992 Los Angeles Riots and the Northridge earthquake in 1994.

In 1985, Diaz began working as a weekend anchor, and three years later, she began anchoring KABC-TV'S 6 pm weekday edition of Eyewitness News. After the departure of Lisa McRee (who was selected to replace Joan Lunden on Good Morning America) in 1997, Diaz was named co-anchor of Eyewitness News at 5 pm and 11 pm alongside Harold Greene and later with Marc Brown after Greene departed in 2000. This promotion made her the first female Hispanic lead anchor at an English language television station in Los Angeles.

Diaz joined KCBS-TV in September 2002 as co-anchor of the CBS 2 News at 5 and 11 pm with Greene, and in 2004 Paul Magers joined her as co-anchor. Diaz was also one of the original hosts of the groundbreaking Vista L.A. on KABC-TV, one of the first public affairs program in Southern California to serve the English-speaking Latino audience in the region. That program won the coveted Imagen Award twice while she was co-host. Her work on Vista L.A. also won three local Emmy Awards. In August 2011 Diaz won a third Imagen award when "Eye on Our Community" was selected as Best Local Informational Program.

She joined the weekend editions of Fox 11 News alongside FOX news anchor Susan Hirasuna in May 2012.

== Awards ==
Diaz is a fourteen-time Emmy Award winner and a three-time Imagen Award winner. In August 2011, Diaz and her team won the Imagen Award for Best Local Informational Program. It focused on the controversial topic of African American and Latino race relations in Los Angeles. This was the first special produced and aired under the CBS2 "Eye on Our Community" banner. In 2006 Diaz earned an Emmy for Individual Achievement in Feature Reporting. She also won back-to-back Golden Mike Awards in 2005 and 2006 for best feature reporting.

In June 2005, she landed the first in-depth television interview with incoming Los Angeles Mayor Antonio Villaraigosa. That story, which Diaz produced and reported, earned her a national Imagen Award in 2006.

In 2003, Diaz received the L.A. Press Club's highest honor, the Joseph M. Quinn Award for journalistic excellence and distinction.

== Creative contribution ==
Diaz sits on the advisory board of trustees of The Joyful Child Foundation, started by children's advocate Erin Runnion. Diaz's commitment to this cause grew from her extensive coverage of the murder of Runnion's daughter, Samantha, by a sexual predator in 2002. The foundation works to organize neighborhood watches around the country and keep child predators off the streets.

By the end of 2004, 51 programs had been established concentrated in the Orange County area of southern California. The California Conservatory of the Arts sponsored a group called the Kids Next Door, who recorded a fundraising Christmas album at the end of 2004, with funds going to the Joyful Child Foundation. In addition to funding the "Samantha's Pride" initiative, the Joyful Child Foundation uses donations to fund children's creative writing and artistic programs; fund nonprofit organisations that seek to prevent child abuse and abduction; and fund research on predator behavior and recidivism.

Diaz is a member of the Diversity Committee for the Pasadena Playhouse.

== Sources ==
- "CBS changes anchor lineup"
- "Laura Diaz to pursue producing career"
