= KCBS-TV =

Television station in Los Angeles

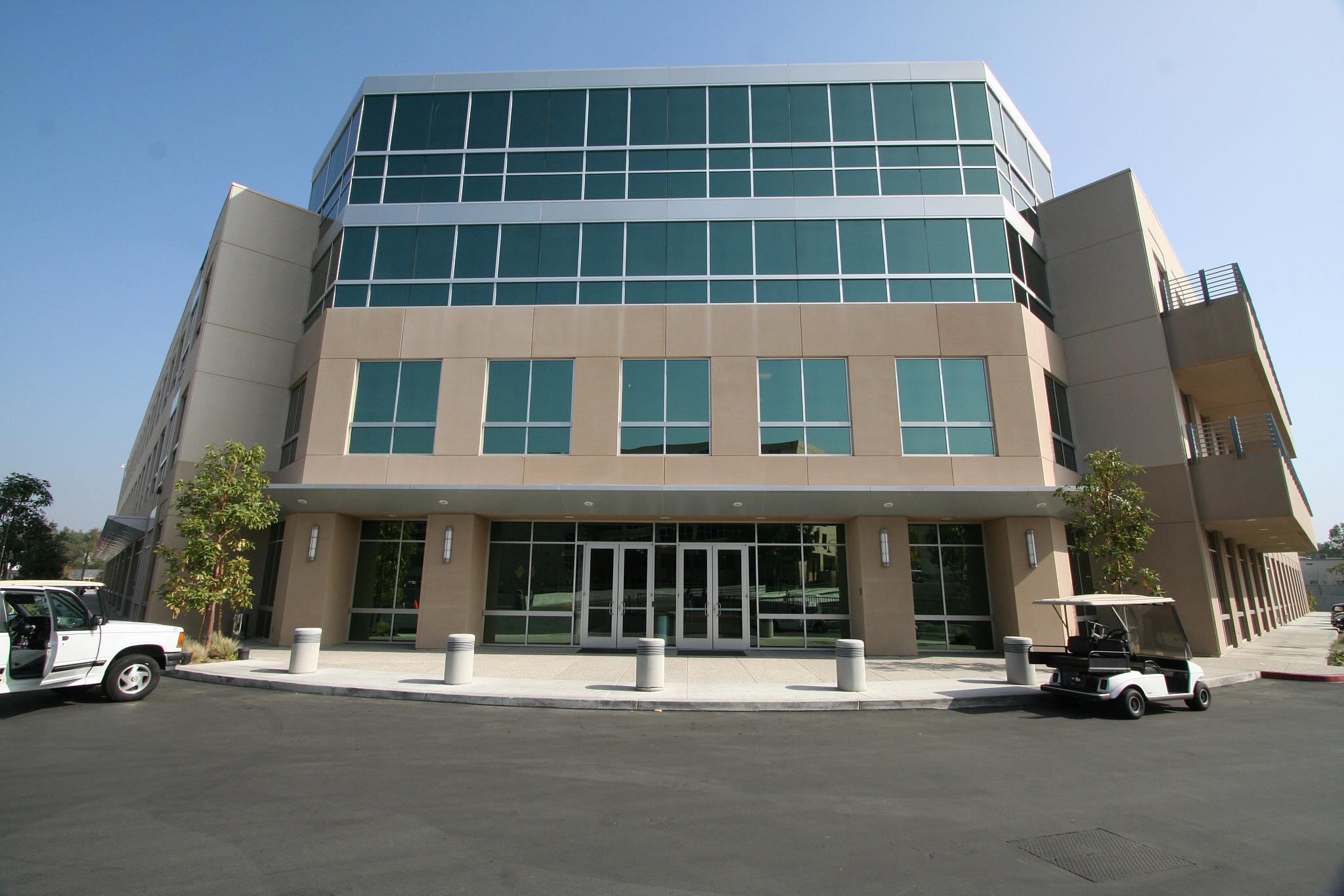
- KCBS and KCAL building in Studio City, Los Angeles
- Los Angeles, California; United States
- Channels: Digital: 31 (UHF); Virtual: 2
- Branding: CBS LA

Programming
- Affiliations: 2.1: CBS; for others, see § Subchannels

Ownership
- Owner: CBS Television Stations; (CBS Broadcasting Inc.)
- Sister stations: KCAL-TV

History
- Founded: June 1931
- First air date: May 6, 1948
- Former call signs: W6XAO (1931–1948); KM2XBD/"KTSL" (1948–1950); KTSL (1950–1951); KNXT (1951–1984)
- Former channel numbers: Analog: 1 (VHF, 1938–1946), 2 (VHF, 1946–2009); Digital: 60 (UHF, 1998–2009), 43 (UHF, 2009–2019)
- Former affiliations: DuMont (1948–1951)
- Call sign meaning: Columbia Broadcasting System, former legal name of CBS

Technical information
- Licensing authority: FCC
- Facility ID: 9628
- ERP: 485 kW
- HAAT: 1,095 m (3,593 ft)
- Transmitter coordinates: 34°13′55″N 118°4′21″W
- Translator(s): see § Translators

Links
- Public license information: Public file; LMS
- Website: www.cbsnews.com/losangeles/

KCBS-TV (channel 2), branded as CBS LA, is a television station in Los Angeles, California, United States. It is the West Coast flagship station of the CBS television network, owned and operated through its CBS Television Stations division. Under common ownership with independent station KCAL-TV (channel 9), the two outlets share studios at the Radford Studio Center on Radford Avenue in the Studio City section of Los Angeles; KCBS-TV's transmitter is located on the western side of Mount Wilson near Occidental Peak.

Aside from being affiliated with CBS News, since 2017, KCBS-TV has had no connection to KCBS radio (740 AM) in San Francisco. The 2017 sale to Entercom (now Audacy) of KCBS radio and KCBS-FM (93.1) in Los Angeles ended almost seven decades of co-ownership among the three stations under CBS. (Note: The use of the KCBS call sign in San Francisco predates its use in Los Angeles by KCBS-TV and KCBS-FM by more than 30 years.)

== History ==
=== Early years (1931–1948) ===
KCBS-TV is the oldest continuously operating television station in the Western United States. It was signed on by Don Lee Broadcasting, which owned a chain of radio stations on the Pacific coast, and was first licensed by the Federal Radio Commission (FRC), forerunner of the Federal Communications Commission (FCC), as experimental television station W6XAO in June 1931. The station went on the air on December 23, 1931, and by March 1933 was broadcasting programming one hour each day on Mondays through Saturdays. The station used a mechanical camera, which broadcast only film footage in an 80-line image, but used all-electronic receivers as early as 1932. It went off the air in 1935, and then reappeared using an improved mechanical camera producing a 300-line image in June 1936. By August 1937, W6XAO had programming six days each week, with live programming starting in April 1938.

By 1939, the station used a fully electronic system and the image quality was improved to 441 lines. At the time, an optimistic estimate of the station's viewership was 1,500 people. Many of the receiver sets were built by television hobbyists, though commercially made sets were available in Los Angeles. The station's six-day weekly schedule consisted of live talent on four nights, and films on two nights. On March 28, 1940, W6XAO presented what contemporary newspapers called the first full-length play televised on the West Coast, The Ides of March by Wilfred Pettit, a Civil War drama about John Wilkes Booth directed by film director Steve Sekely and starring Shirley Thomas and John Barkley.

By 1942, there were an estimated 400–500 television sets in the Los Angeles area, with Don Lee Broadcasting placing television receivers at the following public places: Wilshire Brown Derby, Kiefer's Pine Knot Drive-In, Vine Street Brown Derby, Griffith Planetarium, Miramar Hotel (Santa Monica), Hollywood Roosevelt Hotel and The Town House on Wilshire Boulevard. During World War II, programming was reduced to three hours, every other Monday. The station's frequency was switched from Channel 1 to Channel 2 in March 1946 when the FCC decided to reserve Channel 1 for low-power community television stations, before eliminating it completely. The station was granted a commercial license (the second in California, behind KTLA) as KM2XBD, but calling it KTSL, on May 6, 1948 (and officially changed the call sign to KTSL on October 9, 1950), and was named for Thomas S. Lee, the son of Don Lee. The station became affiliated with the DuMont Television Network later that year. KTSL also launched Peter Potter's Jukebox Jury that year, a musical/quiz series that began to be broadcast nationally during the 1953–1954 season on ABC.

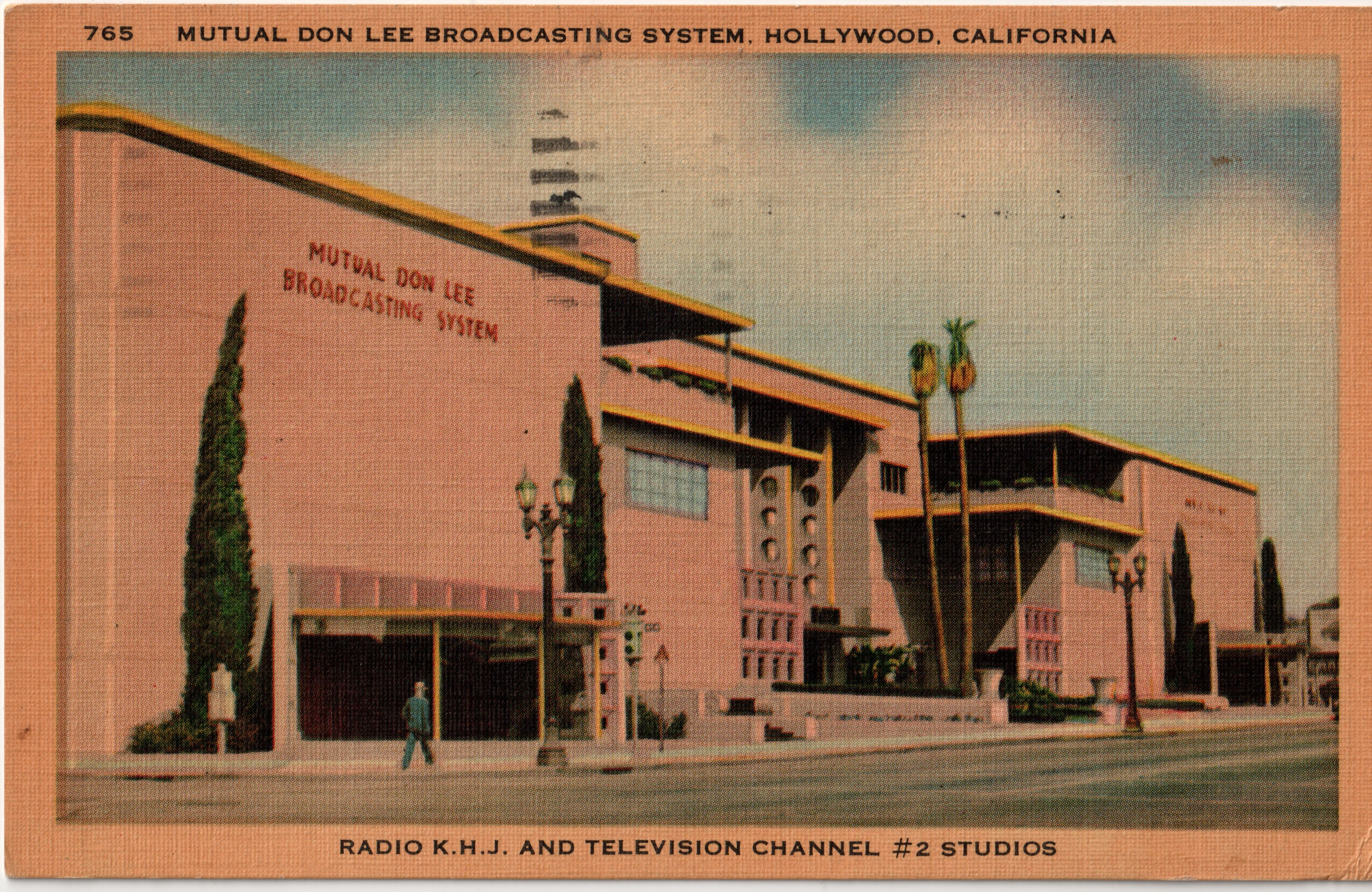
Radio KHJ and Don Lee television channel 2 studios

=== CBS acquisition (1949–1984) ===
Starting in 1949, CBS had been affiliated with KTTV (channel 11, now a Fox owned-and-operated station), a station in which the network held a 49% minority ownership stake.

Don Lee's broadcasting interests were placed for sale in 1950 following the death of Thomas S. Lee. General Tire and Rubber agreed to purchase all of Don Lee's stations, the centerpiece being KHJ radio, but chose to spin off KTSL to CBS. Subsequently, CBS sold its share in KTTV to the station's majority partner, the Los Angeles Times, and all CBS programming moved to KTSL on January 1, 1951. On October 28, 1951, KTSL changed its callsign to KNXT (presumably meaning "KNX Television") to coincide with CBS' Los Angeles radio outlet, KNX (1070 AM). The station also moved its transmitter from Mount Lee, where it had been located since its experimental days, to Mount Wilson.

=== As KCBS-TV (1984–present) ===
On April 2, 1984, at noon, KNXT changed its call letters to the present KCBS-TV. The former KNXT call letters were later used by an unrelated TV station (now KIFR) in Fresno from 1986 to 2021. In 1997, it adopted the "CBS2" moniker for its on-air image, following the lead of sister stations WBBM-TV in Chicago and WCBS-TV in New York City. For a time during the 1980s and 1990s, KNXT/KCBS-TV had several locally produced programs such as 2 on the Town, a local show similar to Evening Magazine and KABC-TV's Eye on L.A., and KidQuiz, a Saturday morning children's game show hosted by longtime weathercaster Maclovio Perez (for a time in the mid-2000s, its sister station KCAL-TV had broadcast a show called 9 on the Town).

In 2002, KCBS-TV became a sister station to KCAL-TV after the latter was purchased by Viacom from Young Broadcasting.

On April 21, 2007, KCBS and KCAL moved from the historic CBS Columbia Square in Hollywood to an all-digital facility at the CBS Studio Center in Studio City. With the move, KTLA became the only broadcast station (either in radio or television) in Los Angeles to be based in Hollywood.

KCBS-TV ended regular programming on its analog signal, over VHF channel 2, and switched to analog nightlight service at 1:10 p.m. on June 12, 2009, as part of the federally mandated transition from analog to digital television. The nightlight service continued to run until July 12, 2009. The station moved its digital signal from its pre-transition UHF channel 60, which was among the high band UHF channels (52–69) that were removed from broadcasting use as a result of the transition, to UHF channel 43, using virtual channel 2.

On October 21, 2014, CBS and Weigel Broadcasting announced the launch of a new digital subchannel service called Decades, scheduled to launch on all CBS-owned stations in the second quarter of 2015, including on KCBS-TV on channel 2.2. On September 3, 2018, Decades was replaced on 2.2 by Start TV with Decades moving to Weigel's KAZA-TV.

On December 4, 2019, CBS Corporation and Viacom remerged into ViacomCBS (now Paramount Skydance Corporation soon folded into Skydance Corporation).

== Programming ==
=== Sports programming ===
In 1956, CBS began broadcasting NFL games, and with it, the Los Angeles Rams had their games aired on Channel 2. This alliance would continue through the 1993 season, when Fox took over the rights to broadcast NFC games, which led to KTTV being the new home station for one season in 1994, before the Rams moved to St. Louis. With the Rams' return to Los Angeles in 2016, Channel 2 will air games in which the Rams play host to an AFC opponent, and any cross-flexed games aired by CBS; the station previously aired Rams preseason games from 2016 to 2019, and intermittently in past years during the team's first stay in greater Los Angeles. From 1982 to 1993, Channel 2 also aired all home inter-conference games of the Raiders during their time in Los Angeles including their win in Super Bowl XVIII. The station also gave coverage to Super Bowl XIV, which the Rams were runners-up in, and Super Bowl XXI, both of which were hosted at the Rose Bowl in nearby Pasadena. As the first Super Bowl was held at the Los Angeles Memorial Coliseum, and was televised nationally on both CBS (the exclusive home of the pre-merger NFL at the time) and NBC (the home network of the American Football League), the game was blacked out locally on KNXT and KNBC (channel 4), due to home-game blackout policies that both leagues had at the time (and carried over into the leagues' merger in 1970) that did not allow home games to be shown locally regardless of whether the game was sold out, and this policy also extended to the host city of the Super Bowl game; starting with the 1973 season, the blackout rules were relaxed; home games were allowed to be televised in the local market, so long as the game sold out 72 hours in advance (the blackout rules were lifted completely in 2015).

In 2017, the station became the unofficial "home" station of the NFL's Chargers franchise, which announced on January 12, 2017, that it had exercised an option to leave its longtime home of San Diego and join the Rams in Los Angeles; the newly relocated and rechristened Los Angeles Chargers are part of the AFC, and therefore most of their games (the vast majority of road games, home games against AFC opponents and select games cross-flexed from Fox) are carried by CBS. Because Los Angeles was previously a secondary market of the Chargers during their time in San Diego, the station was already under requirement to carry the team's road games. KCBS was scheduled to resume carriage of Chargers preseason games starting with the 2020 season; however, with the COVID-19 pandemic affecting the United States, preseason games across the NFL were cancelled and not rescheduled; KCBS ended up broadcasting the Chargers' 2021 preseason games. The station previously televised Charger preseason games from 2002 to 2015.

Sports director Jim Hill, a former Charger, was a sportscaster for CBS Sports during his first stint at KNXT/KCBS-TV, from 1976 to 1987. Hill then left to become sports director at KABC-TV, but returned to KCBS-TV in 1992 and has remained sports director at the station since. Other ex-athletes who are also sportscasters for KCBS and KCAL-TV are Eric Dickerson, Jim Everett, James Worthy and Eric Karros.

From 1973 to 1990, the station aired Los Angeles Lakers games via the NBA on CBS; this included eight NBA Finals appearances by the Lakers during their Showtime era, where they came out victorious five times. Through CBS' contract with Major League Baseball, select Dodgers and Angels games aired on Channel 2 from 1990 to 1993.

Since 2024, KCBS-TV has aired select USC Trojans and UCLA Bruins football games as part of the Big Ten on CBS.

=== News operation ===
KCBS-TV presently broadcasts 30 hours of locally produced newscasts each week (with 4 hours, 35 minutes each weekday; 3 hours, 30 minutes on Saturdays; and 3 hours, 35 minutes on Sundays).

==== News department history ====
In 1961, KNXT created one of the nation's first "newshours". It began with 45 minutes of local news, The Big News, which featured Jerry Dunphy, along with legendary weatherman Bill Keene and sportscaster Gil Stratton. It aired from 6:30 to 7:15 p.m. weeknights, leading into the then-15-minute-long CBS Evening News, which completed the news hour. Also featured were special assignment reporter Maury Green and "Human Predicament" essayist Ralph Story. The team and format helped make KNXT the top-rated news station in Los Angeles. At times, a quarter of Los Angeles television sets were tuned to The Big News and its late-evening companion, Eleven O'Clock Report, the highest ratings ever for a television newscast in the area. The station eventually added reporters such as Howard Gingold and Saul Helpert, among others, and added news bureaus in Sacramento, San Francisco and Orange County, each with full-time correspondents and camera crews.

The Big News expanded to a full hour in September 1963, leading into the new half-hour-long CBS Evening News. Color broadcasts of The Big News and Eleven O'Clock Report began in August 1966. Eventually, KNXT expanded to 2 1/2 hours of local news programming, as well as a late night newscast. KNBC went head-to-head with KNXT with viewers during the 1960s. However, in the mid-1970s, rival KABC-TV began gaining ground in the local news ratings at KNXT's expense. In 1975, KNXT fired Dunphy (who was quickly hired by KABC) and was replaced by Patrick Emory, who had anchored at then-CBS owned-and-operated station KMOX-TV (now KMOV) in St. Louis. KNXT then adopted a format similar to KABC-TV's Eyewitness News with its "happy talk" between anchors. However, the change went nowhere. Just as most of its fellow CBS-owned stations were dominating their cities' ratings, KNXT rapidly fell into last place.

For most of the period from 1975 to 2006, KNXT/KCBS-TV was not a major competitor in the Los Angeles television ratings among the area's local television newscasts. During the period, Channel 2 had frequently changed newscast titles (from The Big News/Eleven O'Clock Report to Channel 2 News in 1973, then to Newsroom in 1976 and back to Channel 2 News by 1978) and formats to styles that often became unsuccessful and even controversial. In September 1986, Channel 2 implemented a news-wheel format for its 4–6:30 p.m. news block, with each hour of news beginning with a 20-minute newscast, followed by two 20-minute programs devoted to certain topics and themes (for example, there was entertainment and lifestyle news early on and harder news stories later in the program), concluding with a half-hour-long local news report; this format was heavily panned by critics and audiences alike, and was dropped after only a month in favor of standard newscasts.

As part of the aforementioned changes, from 1986 to 1987, KCBS produced a 7 p.m. newscast, airing CBS Evening News immediately beforehand at 6:30 p.m. KCBS was also the last station in the Los Angeles area to offer a local early evening newscast at 6:30 p.m., when its 6 p.m. newscast ran for an hour during that time period; CW affiliate KTLA later launched a newscast in that timeslot in January 2009. KCBS produced late afternoon newscasts at 4 p.m. at various points in time. It was the first in the Southland region with a 4:30 p.m. newscast, that was later expanded to an hour.

The late 1980s and early 1990s brought to KCBS the Action News format, in which the station's newscast adopted a tabloid-style format; the format grated on the news staff, which circulated a memo that resulted in the firing of news director John Lippman in 1993. Lippman was criticized, and reportedly had many confrontations with news staff, notably a shoving match between him and anchor Michael Tuck. The station's ratings quickly declined.

CBS management, highly embarrassed at KCBS-TV's subpar performance, responded by bringing in Bill Applegate as general manager. Applegate had previously served as general manager at Chicago sister station WBBM-TV, and was employed at that station as a reporter in the early 1970s. While Applegate had been criticized for making WBBM-TV's newscasts flashier than they had been previously, he set about toning down the format of KCBS-TV's newscasts. One of his strategies involved bringing in popular anchors and reporters from other Los Angeles area stations including Jerry Dunphy, who returned to channel 2 two decades after his earlier firing from the station (Dunphy went on to anchor at KABC-TV and KCAL-TV, both of whom achieved high ratings for their newscasts during each of Dunphy's stints). Also joining Dunphy were colleagues Ann Martin, Dr. George Fischbeck, Paul Dandridge and Mark Coogan from KABC-TV, and Larry Carroll (who worked with Dunphy at KABC and KCAL); two KNBC personalities, Linda Alvarez and consumer reporter David Horowitz also joined the team.

The station's ratings improved, but Applegate eventually became a casualty of CBS' merger with the Westinghouse Electric Corporation in 1996; Applegate had bickered with Westinghouse over the station's syndicated programming not long after he had arrived. Westinghouse executives never forgot this, and Applegate was one of the first executives to be let go. Channel 2's momentum ground to a halt, and it soon dropped into last place. The Action News branding was dropped in late 1996 and the station's newscasts were briefly reverted to Channel 2 News; it was later renamed to CBS 2 News in spring 1997. Dunphy, who was dismissed from KCBS in March 1996 because of the aforementioned CBS merger with Westinghouse, returned to KCAL in November 1997.

KCBS dropped its 4 p.m. newscast in 1998 in favor of the short-lived syndicated talk program The Howie Mandel Show, which was canceled after its first season, then, in 1999, the Women 2 Women public affairs show featuring Martin, Catherine Anaya, Pamela Wright and former KNBC newscaster Kelly Lange. After Viacom's purchase of KCAL-TV, KCBS reintroduced the 4 p.m. newscast, but with it now airing exclusively on KCAL.

KCBS-TV began another attempt to get out of the ratings basement at the start of the 21st century. Kent Shocknek, former anchor of KNBC's Today in L.A., joined KCBS to become its morning co-anchor in 2000. The station then hired longtime KABC anchor Harold Greene in 2001 as anchor of its 5 and 11 p.m. newscasts. The following year, Greene was joined by his former partner at KABC, Laura Diaz. In 2004, Paul Magers, longtime anchor at KARE in Minneapolis–Saint Paul, replaced Greene on the 5 and 11 p.m. newscasts, bumping Greene to the 4 and 6 p.m. programs. The 4 p.m. newscast moved to KCAL-TV with the arrival of Dr. Phil on KCBS in September 2004. At the beginning of 2005, longtime KABC weatherman Johnny Mountain moved to KCBS, surprising many. At first, it seemed that none of these changes brought KCBS any closer to becoming a factor in the Los Angeles news ratings. However, in April 2006, KCBS grabbed the No. 2 spot at 5 p.m. from KABC due to a strong lead-in from Dr. Phil. KCBS shot past both KABC and KNBC to take first place at 11 p.m. for the first time in 30 years.

The 2007 move to Studio City marked many changes at KCBS and KCAL-TV, with several news personalities having departed, including David Jackson (who returned to the duopoly after anchoring at KCAL in the early 1990s), Kerry Kilbride, reporter Jay Jackson, Paul Dandridge, Dilva Henry, Linda Alvarez, sports anchor Alan Massengale and Dave Clark (who left for KTVU in Oakland). Both stations also began broadcasting all their local newscasts, sports shows and public affairs programming in high definition, becoming the third and fourth stations in Los Angeles to do so (following KABC-TV in February 2006 and KTLA in January 2007). In addition, KCBS and KCAL-TV now operate in a completely tapeless newsroom. This newsroom is named in honor of the late former anchor of both stations, Jerry Dunphy. The Dunphy Newsroom is also shared with CBS News, operating as its Los Angeles/West Coast bureau.

On April 1, 2008, the CBS Television Stations division enacted some of the biggest budget cuts in television history, as well as staff layoffs across all of its stations. As a result of the cuts, roughly 10 to 15 staffers were released by KCBS/KCAL. The 6 p.m. anchors Harold Greene and Ann Martin, who both also anchored KCAL-TV's 4 p.m. newscast, chose to retire from television news (Greene and Martin were slated to have their contracts expire in June of that year and were both considered for layoffs). Additionally, longtime KCBS reporter Jennifer Sabih, and reporters Greg Phillips and Jennifer Davis, were let go by the station.

===== NewsCentral era =====
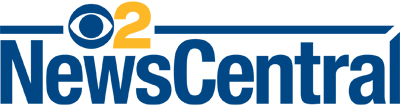
CBS2 NewsCentral logo.

On September 19, 2009, KCBS and KCAL adopted the uniform NewsCentral brand (unrelated to the news organization of the same name formerly operated by Sinclair Broadcast Group). The newscasts were refocused to cover more community news, including stories from outlying communities. Local news headlines from the Los Angeles Newspaper Group and other MediaNews Group newspapers were shown on a news ticker, "street team" submissions of video and photos from viewers were featured, reporters ended stories with NewsCentral rather than the individual station brands, and microphone flags and news vehicles were branded to show both stations' logos at once (the KCBS and KCAL logos were previously displayed on alternating sides). The newscasts claimed that it produced more local news than any other television station in the United States, with reporters in Ventura County, the Inland Empire and Orange County, and the only Los Angeles television station with two helicopters (subcontracted to Angel City Air, owned by reporter Larry Welk). Ed Asner introduced the new newscast. CBS denied that the move was made in response to other stations pooling news gathering resources.

Ratings under the new format during the November 2009 sweeps showed KCBS lagging behind KABC-TV and KNBC in crucial timeslots. On December 10, 2009, Patrick McClenehan resigned after one year as president of KCBS/KCAL and was replaced by Steve Mauldin, who had overseen the CBS-owned duopoly in Dallas–Fort Worth. That week, the NewsCentral brand was rescinded, restoring the CBS 2 News and KCAL 9 News identities. The NewsCentral graphics, microphone flags and logos were retained in the interim, though on-air talent no longer referred to the NewsCentral brand.

===== 2010–2022 =====
By spring 2010, the new management had made significant changes to KCBS' news operation. Veteran forecaster Johnny Mountain retired and was replaced by sister KCAL's Jackie Johnson; joining anchor Paul Magers on the lead newscasts was KCAL veteran Pat Harvey. The morning broadcast was also revamped, and the newly renamed CBS 2 News was given new graphic design and theme music by Frank Gari based on the longstanding ten-note logo originally written by Dick Marx and previously used by KCBS on-and-off since the 1970s.

The August 3, 2011, edition of the CBS Evening News with Scott Pelley was produced live from the Dunphy Newsroom, being the first CBS national newscast to originate from the Studio City facility.

On January 14, 2012, KCBS (and sister KCAL) began broadcasting morning newscasts on weekends, that compete with those offered by KABC-TV, KNBC and KTLA. The station was one of the last major-market CBS-owned affiliates to schedule local news broadcasts on Saturday and Sunday mornings.

In June 2019, CBS News launched a Los Angeles version of its CBSN online news network, featuring exclusive programming to the channel, as well as simulcasts of all KCBS and KCAL newscasts, and selected CBS News programs. This is the second cable/streaming news channel targeted to the Los Angeles area currently in operation, besides the cable-based Spectrum News 1 Southern California, which launched in November 2018. The Los Angeles television market's first cable news network was the Orange County Newschannel, which was in operation from 1990 to 2001, although it was only available and specifically targeted to cable viewers within that county; in OCN's final years, KCBS was a news partner with the channel, with OCN reporters and stories featured on various KCBS newscasts, including a headlines segment on Channel 2's morning newscasts.

===== 2022–present =====
On July 13, 2022, it was announced that KCAL would introduce a new seven-hour morning newscast to replace that of KCBS, running from 4 to 11 am. As a replacement, KCBS planned to air the live East Coast broadcast of CBS Mornings from 4 to 6 am PT, followed by a simulcast of the 6 a.m. hour of the KCAL morning show, and then the West Coast edition of CBS Mornings. CBS News and Stations president Wendy McMahon referred to the changes as "an audience growth opportunity", citing that KCAL's early morning lineup had largely consisted of paid programming, and that the changes would provide additional options for both local and national news to viewers.

Concurrently, it was also revealed that CBS planned to promote KCAL as the main local news outlet of its Los Angeles duopoly; when KCAL News Mornings premiered on January 5, 2023, both stations implemented a company-wide rebranding to align themselves with the network's current corporate identity, and their news programming was rebranded as KCAL News. KCBS also rebranded itself as "CBS Los Angeles"; by October 13, 2025 the abbreviation "CBS LA" had become more common. At that time, KCBS and KCAL would rebrand their news operation as CBS LA to match other CBS owned-and-operated stations.

==== Notable current on-air staff ====
- Paul Deanno – meteorologist
- Pat Harvey – anchor
- Jim Hill – sports anchor and director

==== Notable former on-air staff ====
- Ross Becker – reporter/anchor (1980–1990)
- Joseph Benti – anchor (late 1970s)
- Bob Chandler – 2 On the Town host (1984–1987)
- Sophia Choi
- Connie Chung – anchor/reporter (1976–1983)
- Joel Connable
- Tony Cox – anchor/reporter (1982–1985)
- Ann Curry – reporter (1984–1990)
- Peter Daut – anchor/reporter (2016–2019)
- Laura Diaz – anchor/reporter (2002–2011)
- Linda Douglass – political reporter (1983–1985)
- Jerry Dunphy – anchor (1960–1975, 1995–1996)
- Steve Edwards – weather forecaster/Two on the Town host/entertainment reporter (1978–1981)
- Rich Fields – weather anchor (2010–2016)
- Roy Firestone – sports anchor/reporter (1977–1985)
- Jim Forbes – investigative reporter (1985–1989)
- Dr. George Fischbeck – special correspondent (1994–1997)
- Gary Franklin – entertainment reporter (1981–1986)
- David Garcia – anchor/reporter (1983–1986)
- Carlos Granda – now at KABC-TV
- Harold Greene – anchor (2001–2008)
- Drew Griffin – reporter/anchor (1994–2004)
- Joel Grover – reporter (1996–2002)
- John Hart – reporter (1962–1965)
- Steve Hartman – feature reporter (1994–1998)
- Steve Hartman (sportscaster) – (1998–2010)
- Sandra "Sandy" Hill – (1974–1976, 1982–1986)
- Louisa Hodge – meteorologist; general assignment reporter
- Lester Holt – reporter (1982–1983)
- David Horowitz – consumer reporter (1993–1998)
- Huell Howser – features reporter (1981–1987)
- Ken Jones – anchor/reporter (1976–1982)
- Lisa Joyner – entertainment reporter (2002–2006)
- David Kaye – station announcer (2003–2010)
- Bill Keene – weather anchor/Keene at Noon host/traffic reporter (1954–1972, 1987–1993)
- Steve Kmetko – reporter/entertainment critic (1980–1992)
- Jim Lampley – news and sports anchor (1987–1992)
- Kelly Lange – Women 2 Women host (1999–2001)
- Harvey Levin – legal analyst (1987–1997)
- Dorothy Lucey – anchor/reporter (1987–1992)
- Paul Magers – anchor (2004–2017)
- Dave Malkoff – reporter (2007–2010)
- Mario Machado – consumer affairs reporter/Noontime host (1969–1977)
- Rory Markas – sports anchor (1990–1996)
- Jess Marlow – anchor (1980–1986)
- Ann Martin – (1994–2008)
- Ben McCain – reporter (2000)
- Butch McCain – reporter (2000)
- Gary Miller – sports anchor (2005–2017)
- Dan Miller – anchor/reporter (1986–1987)
- Jim Moret – entertainment reporter/anchor (1984–1987)
- Byron Miranda – weeknight weather anchor (2002–2005)
- DeMarco Morgan – anchor
- Johnny Mountain – weeknight weather anchor (2005–2010)
- Terry Murphy – anchor/reporter (1980–1984, 1987–1989)
- Brent Musburger – anchor/sportscaster/reporter (1978–1981)
- Pat O'Brien – anchor/reporter (1978–1981, 1986–1987)
- Keith Olbermann – sports anchor (1988–1991)
- Warren Olney – anchor/reporter (1969–1975, 1986–1989)
- Mike Parker – investigative reporter (1977–1980)
- Kyra Phillips – reporter/anchor (1995–2000)
- Maury Povich – anchor (1977–1978)
- Clete Roberts – anchor/reporter (1954–1959, 1966–1973)
- Rob Schmitt – anchor (2011–2013)
- John Schubeck – anchor (1983–1988)
- David Sheehan – entertainment reporter (1971–1981, 1994–2003)
- Kent Shocknek – anchor (2001–2013)
- Ralph Story – anchor/features reporter/host of Ralph Story's Los Angeles (1959–1970, 1978–1985)
- Bill Stout – anchor/reporter/"Perspective" commentator (1954–1960, 1972–1989)
- Gil Stratton – sports anchor (1954–1966, 1969–1990)
- Sharon Tay – anchor (2007–2020)
- Ruth Ashton Taylor – anchor/reporter (1951–1958, 1962–1989)
- Tritia Toyota – anchor (1985–1999)
- Michael Tuck – anchor/"Perspective" commentator (1990–1999)
- Bob Tur – helicopter pilot/reporter
- Charlie Van Dyke – station announcer (1987–1993)
- Sibila Vargas – anchor (2010–2013)
- Bree Walker – anchor/reporter (1988–1994)
- Colleen Williams – anchor/reporter (1983–1986)
- Alex Witt – (1990–1992)
- Paula Zahn – anchor/reporter (1986–1987)

== Technical information ==
=== Subchannels ===
The station's signal is multiplexed:

Subchannels of KCBS-TV
Subchannel	Res.	Short name	Programming
2.1	1080i	KCBS-HD	CBS
2.2	480i	StartTV	Start TV
2.3	480i	Dabl	Dabl
2.4	480i	365BLK	365BLK
13.2	480i	BUZZR	Buzzr (KCOP-TV)

Broadcast on behalf of another station

=== Translators ===
- K22NA-D Inyokern
- K25QB-D Lucerne Valley
- K30GU-D Morongo Valley
- K10IX-D Newberry Springs
- K15FC-D Twentynine Palms

== See also ==
- KNX (AM)
- KCBS-FM
- KCBS-TV/FM Tower
