= Today in L.A. =

- Also known as: Today in L.A. Weekend
- Presented by: Weekdays: Adrian Arambulo; Lynette Romero; Weekends: Mekahlo Medina; Michelle Valles
- Theme music composer: Groove Addicts
- Opening theme: "L.A. Groove"
- Country of origin: United States
- Original language: English

Production
- Production locations: Universal Studios Hollywood, Universal City, California
- Camera setup: Multi-camera
- Running time: 180 minutes (weekdays); 120 minutes (Saturdays); 150 minutes (Sundays)

Original release
- Network: KNBC
- Release: 1986 – present

Today in L.A. is a local morning news and entertainment television program airing on KNBC (channel 4), an NBC owned-and-operated television station in Los Angeles, California that is owned by the NBCUniversal Owned Television Stations division of NBCUniversal. The program is broadcast each weekday morning from 4:00 to 7 a.m. Pacific Time, immediately preceding NBC's Today. Weekend editions of the program (branded as Today in L.A. Weekend) also air on Saturday and Sunday from 7 to 8 a.m. (immediately following Weekend Today on Saturdays and Sunday Today with Willie Geist, respectively).

The local news cut-ins that are broadcast during Today (at approximately :26 and :56 minutes past the hour) are also branded as Today in L.A.. Portions of the morning newscast were previously seen on Cozi TV Los Angeles's The Morning Mix on KNBC digital subchannel 4.2. The program maintains a general format of news stories, traffic reports and weather forecasts, but also includes sports summaries, and entertainment and feature segments.

== Background ==
The program became the first local morning newscast in Southern California when it debuted on KNBC on June 16, 1986, as a half-hour lead-in to NBC's long-running morning news program Today. Kent Shocknek and Pat DaSilva were the original anchors of the program, with Christopher Nance handling weather duties, and Fred Roggin appearing in a sports segment that was pre-taped the night before. DaSilva, who is Mexican-American also became the first Latina female to anchor a weekday morning newscast.

The program later expanded to an (from 6 to 7 a.m.) hour, then to 90 minutes (from 5:30 to 7 a.m.) in the mid 1990s and to two hours (from 5 to 7 a.m.) in 1999; the program previously airs from 4:30-7 a.m. from 2010 to 2017. On July 31, 2017, the program was expand to 3 hours with an addition of its half-hour at 4:00 a.m. With the expansion of the weekend editions of the Today Show, Today in L.A. expanded to weekends in 1992.

Eventual successors at the Today in L.A. anchor desk included Carla Aragón, Kathy Vara, David Cruz, Kelly Mack, Chris Schauble and Jennifer Bjorklund. Rachel Boesing served as weather anchor, while Paul Johnson provided traffic reports and also serving as a fill-in weather anchor. Vara, Mack, Cruz and Schauble eventually left the station; Vara later returned to KNBC in March 2010 after nine years at crosstown ABC O&O KABC-TV (channel 7), and Schauble later became anchor of the 4-7 a.m. block of KTLA (channel 5)'s weekday morning newscast in early 2011. Bjorklund remained at KNBC, transitioning into a general assignment reporter role, before leaving in 2012. Boesing worked as a host of My County, a community access program on the Los Angeles County Channel and is currently a Show Host on the QVC Shopping Channel. Johnson died in June 2010 at the age of 75, after battling brain tumors.

Since its inception, Today In L.A. has been among the highest-rated in the market, and has served as the inspiration for the local morning news concept. KABC-TV and KCBS-TV began airing their own morning newscasts in 1989. KCAL-TV (channel 9) briefly ran an hour-long morning newscast during its early years under the ownership of The Walt Disney Company (prior to the company's purchase of KABC and the subsequent sale of KCAL to Young Broadcasting in 1996), before cancelling it and replacing the program with children's programming. KTLA introduced a morning newscast starting in 1991, while KTTV (channel 11) began its morning news block in the fall of 1993; both stations' newscasts are highly rated and usually rate #1 or 2 in their timeslots.

In 2016, the morning program began a partnership with KABC as the radio station airs the first half-hour of the program as part of a joint agreement with KNBC and KABC's parent company Cumulus Media.

== Current on–air staff ==
- Adrian Arambulo – anchor (2017–present)
- Lynette Romero - anchor (2022–present)
- Michelle Valles — anchor (weekends)
- Belen De Leon – weather
- Robin Winston - traffic; Holly Hannula — fill in traffic

== Notable former on–air staff ==
- Andy Adler - traffic anchor (2010–2014); now with KTVT/Dallas
- Carla Aragon - anchor (1987–1994); later with KOB-TV in Albuquerque
- Michael Brownlee - anchor (2012–2014); now afternoon anchor for KNBC
- Jennifer Bjorklund - anchor (2006–2011); currently freelancing for NBC News
- David Cruz (journalist) - anchor (2001–2007); later with WOAI-TV in San Antonio
- Pat Da Silva - anchor (1986–1987)
- Crystal Egger – meteorologist (2013–2017)
- Daniella Guzman – anchor (2014-2021); now with KPRC/Houston
- Whit Johnson – anchor (2014–2017); now with ABC News
- Alycia Lane – anchor (2010–2013)
- Elita Loresca - meteorologist (2007–2015); now with KTRK/Houston
- Kelly Mack - anchor (2001–2007)
- Christopher Nance - meteorologist (1986–2002); deceased
- Chris Schauble - anchor (2007–2011); now with KTLA
- Kent Shocknek – anchor (1986–2001); later with KCBS and KCAL/Los Angeles
- Kathy Vara – anchor (1994–2001, 2011–2012); now weekend evening anchor for KNBC

== See also ==
- Today in New York – a similar morning news and entertainment program on sister station WNBC in New York City.
