= Maria Sansone =

American television personality (born 1981)

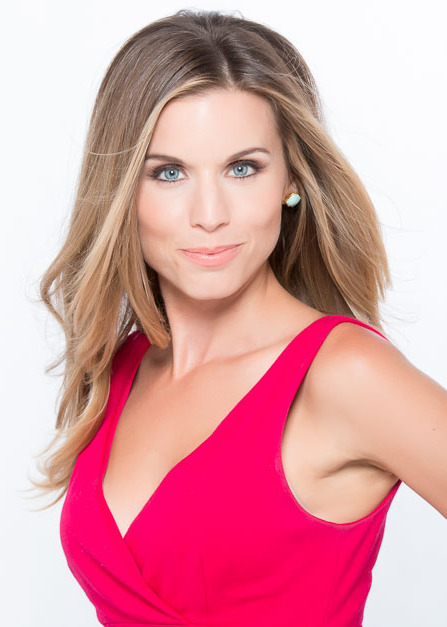
- Sansone in August 2014
- Born: February 26, 1981 (age 44); Erie, Pennsylvania, U.S.
- Occupation: Television personality
- Spouse: Joshua Guthartz (2008–present)
- Children: 2
- Website: Official website

Maria Grace Sansone (born February 26, 1981) is an American television personality. Sansone is the former co-anchor of Good Day LA on KTTV Fox 11 in Los Angeles until January 2017 and is a former field reporter for WNBC 4 New York, appearing daily on LX New York. She has also appeared on shows and networks such as Access Hollywood, Extra, On the Red Carpet, ABC, NBC, MTV, TV Guide Network, Yahoo!, CBS Sports, NESN and ESPN.

== Career ==
Sansone was born in Erie, Pennsylvania, and started in the television business as an 11-year-old sports reporter for WJET-TV in her home town. She earned the title "The Youngest Reporter in the History of Network Television" when she was put under contract at ABC Sports to host Wide World of Sports for Kids, a show the network created specifically to showcase Maria's hosting abilities. In addition, she reported live from the sidelines of the Little League World Series for several seasons.

As a teenager, Sansone was a co-host with Ryan Seacrest on the game show Gladiators 2000, the children's version of American Gladiators, a concept created in her hometown of Erie.

While a student at the S.I. Newhouse School at Syracuse University, Sansone studied broadcasting and political science. During her junior year, she guest co-hosted with Regis Philbin on Live with Regis and Kelly. Prior to graduating from Syracuse, she was hired as a VJ for MTVU, where she hosted and produced shows from colleges and spring break locations around the world. In 2006. she would go on to host the morning web series for Yahoo! called The 9, where she counted down the top stories of the day, created sketches and interviewed celebrity guests.

Sansone went on to work at WNBC 4 New York, where she was a lifestyle reporter appearing live each day on LX New York, while also hosting the nationally syndicated 1st Look on NBC. She then appeared on TV Guide Network's live red carpet coverage of major award shows which she co-hosted for with Chris Harrison, in addition to her work on the weekly entertainment show Hollywood 411. Sansone then spent several years co-hosting Los Angeles' morning news show, Good Day LA on Fox 11 alongside Steve Edwards. At Fox 11, she anchored 20 hours of live television per week, which included interviewing Hollywood stars and covering breaking news.

== Personal life ==
Sansone lives in Boston, Massachusetts, with her husband, Josh, their children, Grace and Benjamin, and their dog, Ralphie.

Preceded by Gerrad Hall	1st Look host 2011	Succeeded by Ali Fedotowsky
