= Bernsen =

Bernsen is a surname. Notable people with the surname include:

- Corbin Bernsen (born 1954), American actor
- Randy Bernsen (born 1954), American jazz guitarist
- Rod Bernsen (born 1948), Los Angeles Police Department sergeant
- Collin Bernsen (born 1958), American actor
