= Helen Bernstein High School =

Public high school in California, United States

Coordinates: 34.095623°N 118.314021°W

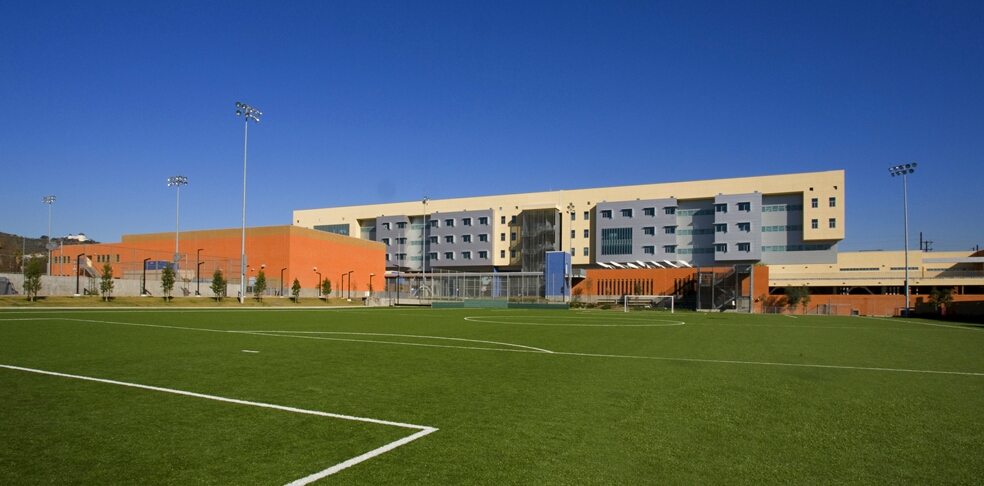

Location
- 1309 N. Wilton Place; Hollywood, California 90028

Information
- Established: 2008
- Locale: City, Large
- School district: Los Angeles Unified School District
- NCES District ID: 0622710
- NCES School ID: 062271012234
- Principal: Alejandro Ramirez
- Teaching staff: 45.17 (on an FTE basis)
- Grades: 9-12
- Enrollment: 703 (2024–25)
  - Male: 408
  - Female: 295
- Student to teacher ratio: 15.56
- Campus type: Urban
- Colors: Royal Blue Black and White
- Slogan: Providing Pathways for Long life success
- Athletics conference: Central League; CIF Los Angeles City Section
- Mascot: Dragons
- Rivals: Hollywood High School
- Website: bernsteinhs.lausd.org

Helen Bernstein High School is a public high school in the Hollywood area of Los Angeles, California. The school is named after educational reformer and former president of United Teachers Los Angeles, Helen Bernstein. As of the 2024–25 school year, the school served over 700 students, and had a student teacher ratio of 15.56.

== History ==
During the planning stages, Helen Bernstein High School was known as Central Los Angeles New High School No. 1 and was planned to help relieve overcrowding at Hollywood and Marshall high schools. It opened in the fall of 2008. It was also used as the high school setting for the hit TV show Glee.

== Campus ==
Bernstein occupies the former site of the Fox Television Center (formerly Metromedia Square, the longtime home of Fox Television station KTTV). Perkins+Will architects designed the buildings.

== Curriculum ==
Bernstein High School is a comprehensive school with a Cinematic Arts and Creative Tech magnet and an International Newcomer Academy. It shares the campus with another LAUSD school, the Science, Technology, Engineering, and Medicine (STEM) Academy, which operates independently on the Helen Bernstein Campus.

== Athletics ==
The campus is home to the Dragons. Bernstein is home to sports including football, basketball, track and field, soccer, volleyball, softball, wrestling, swimming, cross country, cheerleading, and drill team.
