= Kathy Vara =

American news anchor

- Born: Katherine Scott; San Antonio, Texas, U.S.
- Citizenship: American
- Occupations: Journalist, News Anchor
- Years active: 1994-present
- Spouse: Rene Vara

Kathy Vara is an American television news anchor in Los Angeles.

== Early life ==
Vara is a native of San Antonio, Texas She began her broadcasting career at University of North Texas, where she was a producer and host of "North Texas Scene".

== Career ==
Prior to moving to Los Angeles, Vara worked at NBC stations in Dallas, Minneapolis, and Washington, DC. She also had worked at ABC affiliates KVII-TV in Amarillo, Texas (1987-1988) and KSAT-TV (1988-1992) in her hometown of San Antonio, Texas. In June 1994, she began her career in Los Angeles on KNBC's Today in L.A., their morning newscast. At KNBC, she has covered many stories including the O.J. Simpson trial, the Columbine High School shooting, the Conrad Murray trial, the Oklahoma City bombing, and the North Hollywood bank robbery shootout. Eventually, in 2001, Vara was employed at KABC-TV on their morning newscast, as well until early 2010.

Vara left KABC after a nine-year stint on the morning news and made her first on-air appearance March 29, 2010 on Today in L.A.. The former KABC-TV Channel 7 Eyewitness News morning anchor returned to "Today in L.A." after anchoring from 1994 to 2001.

== Personal life ==
Vara lives in the Greater Los Angeles Area with her husband Rene and various pets. In her spare time she is committed to organizations that help promote Lupus awareness, speaking at various establishments, and is also an equestrienne.
