= Elex Michaelson =

American television news anchor

- Michaelson in 2026
- Born: Elexander Michaelson; October 18, 1986 (age 40); Agoura Hills, California, U.S.
- Education: Agoura High School
- Alma mater: University of Southern California (B.J., BSocSc)
- Occupations: Television journalist; news anchor
- Notable work: The Issue Is; The Story Is with Elex Michaelson

Elexander Michaelson (born October 18, 1986) is an American television journalist and news anchor for CNN. From 2018 until his departure in 2025, he served as a co-anchor for KTTV's evening newscasts as well as the host and producer of The Issue Is, the station's weekly political talk show. On The Issue Is, he gained recognition for reporting on local and state politics, conducting interviews with various officeholders and providing sports coverage. He is currently anchor of the show The Story Is with Elex Michaelson, on CNN and CNN International.

== Early life ==
Michaelson was born on October 18, 1986 in Agoura Hills, California to David and Crystal Michaelson, a painter and mixed media artist. In 2010, his family moved to Venice, an area in Los Angeles. He has a sister, Danielle Michaelson, who resides and works in Santa Monica, California. He attended Agoura High School, where he served as the student body president and played on the school's basketball team. In 2003, he received the Interscholastic Federation Award for Pursuing Victory with Honor in recognition of his leadership in several projects at the school. He graduated from there in 2004.

Elex Michaelson attended the University of Southern California's Annenberg School for Communication and Journalism, where he graduated summa cum laude with a bachelor's degree in both broadcast journalism and political science, also receiving Phi Beta Kappa honors. He initially enrolled as a political science major and was accepted to the school of journalism during the second round of applications.

== Career ==
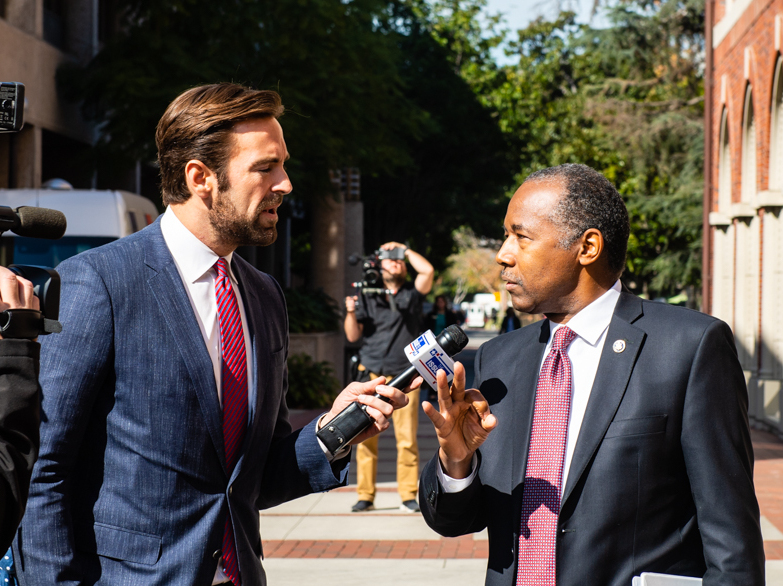
Michaelson interviewing Ben Carson, the Secretary of Housing and Urban Development, in Los Angeles, February 2020

Michaelson began his journalism career as an intern at KTTV, after meeting with the executive producer by arriving unannounced and waiting for an in-person meeting. He also held internship positions in Washington, D.C. and New York City, before working at XETV in San Diego as a weeknight reporter and KABC in Los Angeles as a fill-in news anchor from 2010 to 2017. He returned to KTTV in 2017, joining the Fox 11 Morning News alongside Araksya Karapetyan.

During his tenure at KTTV, he organized and co-moderated debates for various state and local political positions, in addition to covering national politics for the station. He became a "well-liked figure" in the Los Angeles media according to the Los Angeles Times, conducting interviews with national figures including Donald Trump, Hillary Clinton, and Bernie Sanders, as well as Gavin Newsom, Arnold Schwarzenegger, Rick Caruso, Karen Bass and other politicians. Michaelson was known for providing each interviewee and panelist with a box of desserts made by his mother, Crystal Michaelson. The gesture was noted by columnist Gustavo Arellano in the Los Angeles Times, who described the treats as a variety that "didn't last the drive back to Orange County." In August 2025, he announced that he would be leaving the station for an opportunity that he was unable to disclose. On September 11, 2025, CNN announced that Michaelson would be joining the network to host a late-night program from Los Angeles. The show, The Story Is with Elex Michaelson premiered on October 27, 2025.

== Personal life ==
In a 2021 Men's Health article, Michaelson spoke how for years, he participated in the Malibu Triathlon, in order to benefit Children's Hospital Los Angeles. During the COVID-19 pandemic in Los Angeles, he stopped exercising and put on weight. He started exercising and lost 28 pounds after his pants split on air while sitting during a newscast.
