= Kent Shocknek =

American television journalist

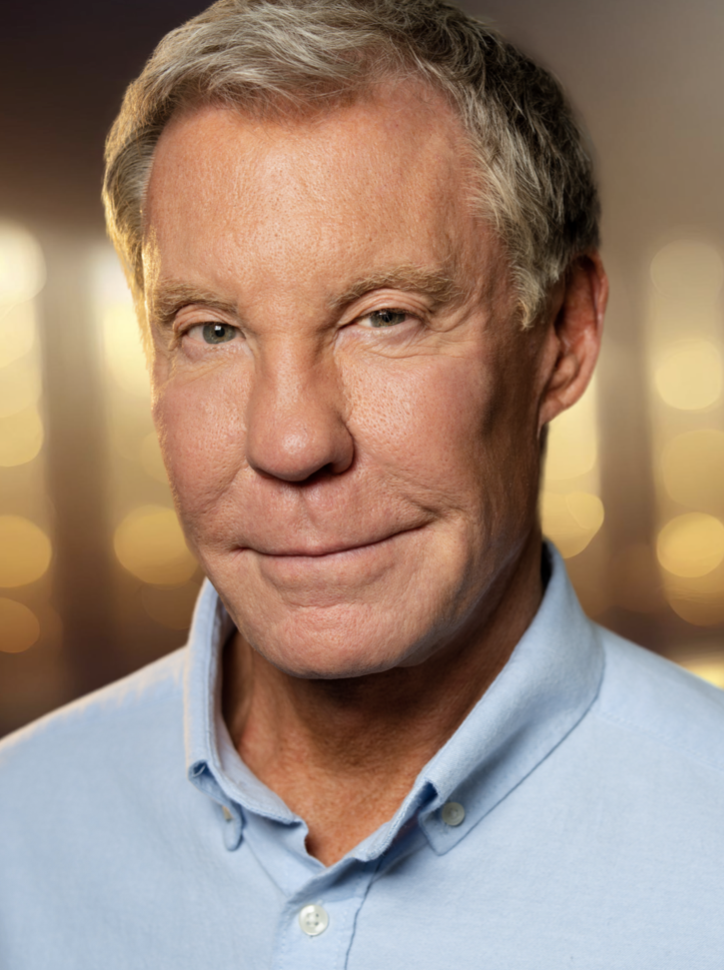
Kent Shocknek, TV & film personality. USC BA, Phi Beta Kappa.

Kent Shocknek is an Emmy Award winning American television and film personality who branched into acting toward the end of a successful career as a TV newscaster. Because of the length of his journalism career, duration of his broadcasts, and breaking news events, by the time of his departure from news, he is credited with having logged more hours as an anchor than anyone else in Los Angeles. The city has designated two separate days "Kent Shocknek Day" in his honor. Before anchoring prime-time newscasts on CBS-TV owned stations, Shocknek was Southern California's first and longest-running television news morning news anchor. Because of his recognizability, he has been sought out to appear in more than 100 feature films and television dramas –often as a newscaster or commentator –giving rise to a popular second career that continues currently. On radio, Shocknek has narrated daily commentaries in L.A., and has hosted a nationally syndicated entertainment program. Viewers and magazine readers also recognize him as an authority on automotive issues.

== Career ==
Born Kent Schoknecht in Berkeley, California, he simplified the on-air spelling of his name upon arrival to Los Angeles television. After working at the Long Beach Press Telegram while attending the University of Southern California, Shocknek's first TV reporting job was in Sioux City, Iowa (KCAU-TV), followed by a three-year stint as anchor and Space Shuttle reporter in Orlando, Florida (WFTV).

In 1983, Shocknek joined KNBC-TV as a reporter and fill-in anchor for what was then known as News4LA. Three years later, he anchored the start-up of L.A.'s first TV morning news program, Today in LA on KNBC-TV. Over the years, he broadcast —frequently single-handedly— such marathon events as the Los Angeles riots, O.J. Simpson murder trial, and numerous natural disasters.

Shocknek first made national news headlines anchoring the 1986 launch and explosion of the Space Shuttle Challenger; and a strong aftershock to the deadly 5.9 1987 Whittier Narrows earthquake. The threat of falling studio lights forced Shocknek to take cover under his set's desk for several seconds as he continued reporting about ground- and studio movement.

After helming the consistently top-rated KNBC program for 15 years, Shocknek moved to KCBS-TV to anchor morning editions of CBS 2 News in 2001. There, L.A. Confidential magazine named him one of L.A.'s top three anchors. He anchored live the September 11 attack on the World Trade Center, and subsequently reported live on the War in Iraq, Michael Jackson's funeral, presidential inaugurations; plus Southern California's seasonal wildfires and frequent high-speed freeway chases. In November 2013, Shocknek and his popular morning coanchor Suzie Suh moved to prime-time spots on Los Angeles CBS TV-owned station KCAL-TV, anchoring #1-rated newscasts, KCAL 9 News at 8 pm and 10 pm. In a move that surprised viewers, he retired from newscasting in late 2014. Shocknek's final newscast —including a 10-minute career retrospective and farewell video featuring L.A. newsmakers and Hollywood celebrities— aired September 26, 2014. Various local governments and agencies, including the City and County of Los Angeles, as well as the State of California, have honored him for his work.

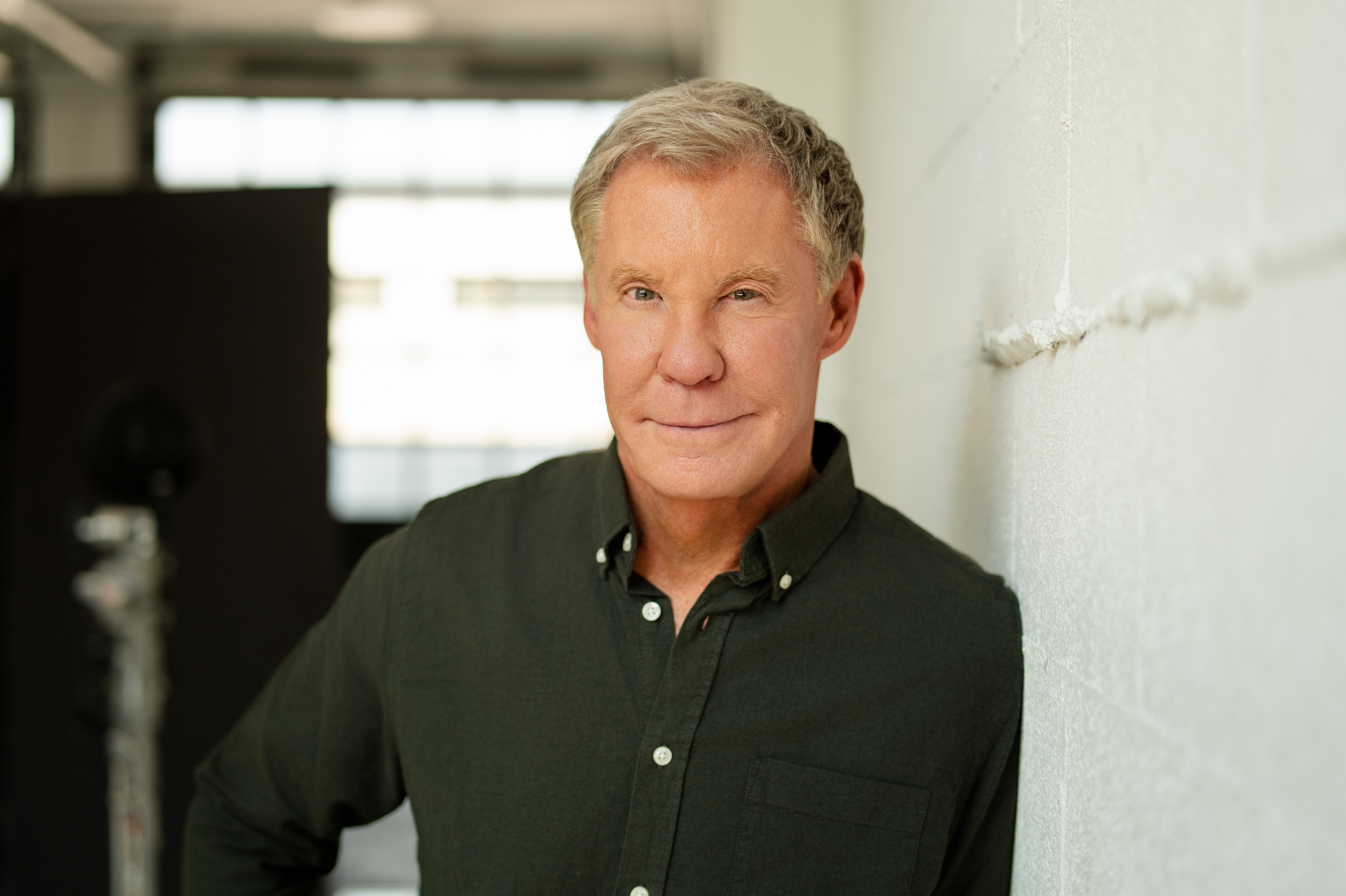
Kent Shocknek

Shocknek has continued his presence in front of the camera, portraying newscasters and various authority figures in more than 100 major Hollywood film & TV productions and independent films. He has worked with directors Steven Spielberg, Adam McKay in Anchorman: The Legend of Ron Burgundy, Barry Levinson, and Justin Lin, among others. On television, Shocknek has marked more than a dozen appearances as newsman "Guy Ross" in the crime procedural drama NCIS and its spin-off series, NCIS: Los Angeles. He also has held recurring roles in Criminal Minds, and the Amazon series, Bosch.

Shocknek's voice is almost as well known as his image; he began writing and delivering the 60-second daily radio commentary Just A Minute with Kent Shocknek on CBS all-news radio station KNX-1070 AM in Los Angeles, in 2003. Later, he launched Premiere Magazine Live!, a weekly national radio show about movies, in approximately 50 markets countrywide, with his wife Karen, using the on-air surname Walters, working as co-host.

== Filmography ==
Film
Title	Year	Role	Notes
Whodunnit	2026	Announcer	
Borderline	2026	Reporter	
The Dink	2026	Reporter #2	
The Subcontractors	2025	James	Feature film, also co-producer
Lilly Lives Alone	2025	Man at grocery store	
Parallel Process	2025	Mentor	
Gator Lake: Bonecrusher's Revenge	2025	Paul	
Raveland	2023	Jacobed's father	
Very Close Friends	2021	Man	Short film, male lead, also co-producer
The Chosen One?	2021	Solemn Leader	
Mona Lisa and the Blood Moon	2021	TV New Anchor	Cannes Film Festival official entry
Take Me to Tarzana	2021	Himself	4 film festival official entry
Lucy in the Sky	2019	Himself	Also known as Pale Blue Dot
Speeeed Dating	2018	Man No. 4	Short film
Batman v Superman: Dawn of Justice	2016	Himself	
The Vatican Tapes	2015	TV Interviewer	Uncredited
Nightcrawler	2014	Himself	
The Six O'Clock	2014	Man	Short film, male lead
Jobs	2013	1980 Newscaster	
The Amazing Spider-Man	2012	TV Newscaster	Uncredited
Ultraman Saga	2012	Capt. Hibiki	Voice
Brake	2012	News Anchor Jack Stern	
Fast Five	2011	News Anchor	
The Chosen One	2010	Newscaster	
The Company Men	2010	Rittenour	
Mega Monster Battle: Ultra Galaxy	2010	Battlenizer	Voice
Imagine That	2009	Financial Reporter	
Eagle Eye	2008	Newscaster	
Winged Creatures	2008	Hospital Reporter	Originally titled Fragments, released on DVD as Winged Creatures
Superhero Movie	2008	News Anchor	
Parasomnia	2008	Himself	
Disturbia	2007	News Anchor	
Primeval	2007	Newscaster	
xXx: State of the Union	2005	Newscaster	
Wake Up, Ron Burgundy: The Lost Movie	2004	Network Reporter	Direct-to-video
First Daughter	2004	Contentious Reporter	
Anchorman: The Legend of Ron Burgundy	2004	Network Reporter	
The Terminal	2004	Newscaster #1	Uncredited
Envy	2004	Newscaster	
A View to a Kill	1985	Fisherman	Uncredited

Television
Title	Role	Notes
Lanterns	News Anchor	HBO Max
Bosch: Legacy	L.A. Newscaster	3 episodes IMDb TV/Amazon
NCIS	Guy Ross/Male Reporter	11 episodes
Bull	Interviewer, badgering reporter	Season 4 ep17: "The Invisible Woman," and Season 6 episode 16: "The Diana Affair"
Sherman's Showcase	Kent Shocknek	IFC/Hulu
Shrill	Local newscaster	Hulu
SpongeBob DocuPants	Host	Nickelodeon: 8 episodes
Secrets of Sulphur Springs	News Anchor	Feifer Worldwide Entertainment
Bosch	Himself/Newscaster/News Anchor	10 episodes
Tommy	News Anchor	Season 1: episodes 7, 10
Manhunt: Dangerous Games	Anchor No. 1	The title of the second Manhunt: Unabomber; Season 2 episodes 1,2,5
Manifest	News Anchor	Season 2 episode 5: "Coordinated Flight"
Liberty Falls	Pierce Brennan	TV movie
The Righteous Gemstones	Announcer	HBO
Documentary Now!	TV Reporter	Season 3 episodes 1 and 2: "Batsh*t Valley, Parts 1 & 2"
Madam Secretary	News Anchor #1/News Anchor/Anchor	5 episodes
Supergirl	Newscaster	Season 1 episode 12: "Bizarro"
Brooklyn Nine-Nine	Slade Austin	Season 4 episode 3: "Coral Palms Pt. 3"
NCIS: Los Angeles	News Reporter/Reporter/News Anchor	6 episodes
Intelligence	Reporter/Newscaster	4 episodes
Legends	CBN Reporter	Season 1 episode 8: "Iconoclast"
Under the Dome	Newscaster	Season 1 episode 1: "Pilot"
Criminal Minds	News Reporter/News Anchor Kent/Reporter John Jenkins	3 episodes
The Mentalist	Newscaster	Season 4 episode 15: "War of the Roses"
CSI: NY	Reporter	Season 6 episode 12: "Criminal Justice"
True Jackson, VP	Himself	Season 1 episode 17: "Max Mannequin" and season 2 episode 13: "True Royal"
Medium	Newscaster	Season 6 episode 10: "You Give Me Fever"
FlashForward	Hansen/Medical Correspondent	4 episodes
Washington Field	David Sumner	TV movie
Meteor	WNN Overnight Anchor/Anchorman	Episodes: #1.1 and #1.2
The Sarah Silverman Program	TV Reporter/Anchor	Season 2 episode 10: "Patriot Tact" and Season 2 episode 16: "Vow Wow"
The Unit	TV Newscaster	Season 4 episode 1: "Into Hell: Part One"
Dirty Sexy Money	Channel 10 Reporter	Season 2 episode 12: ""The Family Lawyer"
Grave Misconduct	TV Reporter	TV movie
ER	News Reporter	Season 14 episode 17: "Under Pressure"
Monk	TV Reporter	Season 6 episode 12: "Mr. Monk Goes to the Bank"
Shark	Newscaster/TV Reporter/Reporter	3 episodes
Commander in Chief	News Anchor Ben/News Anchor	Season 1 episode 11: "No Nukes Is Good Nukes" and Season 1 episode 16: The Elephant in the Room
The West Wing	Anchorman	Season 6 episode 20: "In God We Trust"
Blossom	Himself	Season 4 episode 14: "Big Doings: Part 2"

== Awards ==
- 8 regional Emmy Awards (individual and group)
- 2 L.A. Press Club Awards
- Golden Mic. Award (Best Daytime Newscast)
- Wm. Randolph Hearst Award (investigative reporting)

== Education ==
B.A., University of Southern California, magna cum laude, Phi Beta Kappa
