= Metromedia Square =

Radio and television facility in Hollywood, California, USA

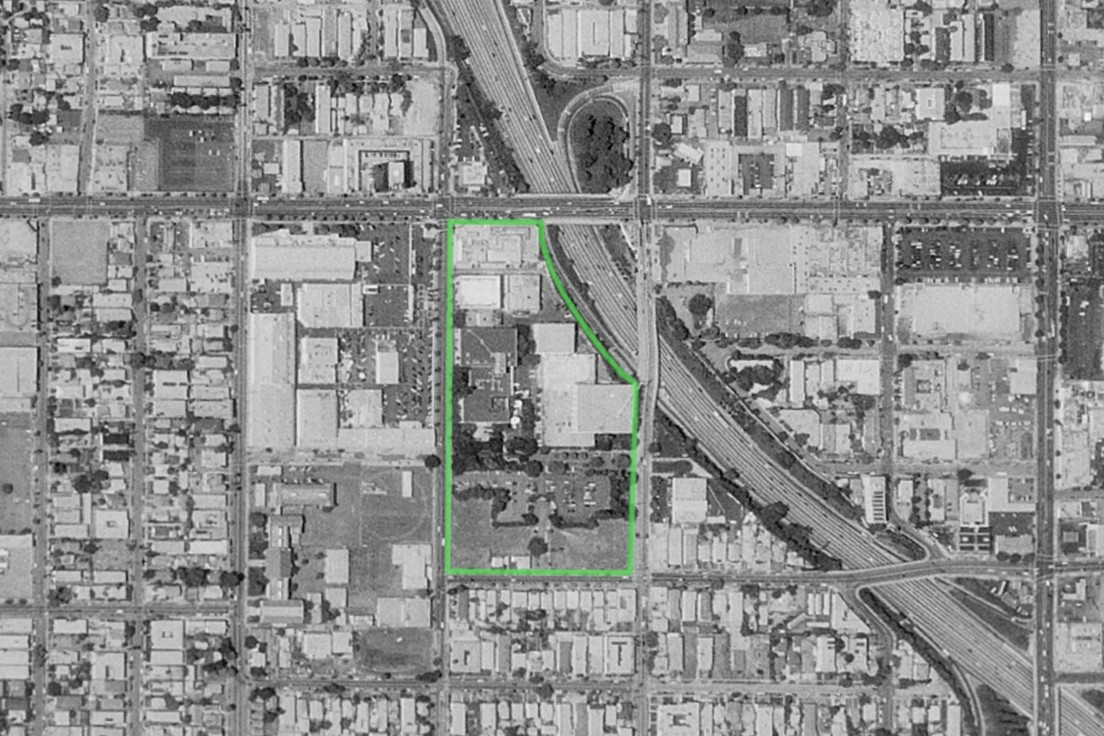
- Satellite image of Metromedia Square from May 1994
- Former names: Nassour Studios (1947–1950); KTTV Studios (1950–1967); Fox Television Center (I) (1986–1996)

General information
- Status: Demolished
- Type: Film, radio, and television studios
- Architectural style: Art Deco
- Location: 5746 Sunset Boulevard; Hollywood, California; 90028
- Coordinates: 34.098080°N 118.315033°W
- Groundbreaking: 1946
- Opened: 1947
- Renovated: 1967
- Closed: 2000
- Demolished: 2003
- Landlord: Nassour Studios (1947–1950); Times Mirror Company (1950–1963); Metromedia (1963–2000)

Metromedia Square (later known as Fox Television Center from 1986 to 1996) was a radio and television studio facility located at 5746 Sunset Boulevard in Hollywood, Los Angeles, California on the southeastern corner of Sunset and Van Ness Avenue in the Los Angeles metropolitan area. For decades, it was recognizable by the white, ladder-like snake on the building's roof. This work of art was called "Starsteps" and was dismantled when ownership of the building changed hands in 2000.

== Landmark status ==
Metromedia Square was one of the Los Angeles landmarks that had previous landmark status in the late 20th century, until demolition in the first couple of years in the 21st century; 14 years before the demolition of the Los Angeles Memorial Sports Arena, another lost Los Angeles landmark demolished to make way for the Banc of California Stadium in 2016. The lattice steel, truss-like sculpture on top of the building, "Starsteps" was what made Metromedia Square a Los Angeles landmark in the 1980s and 1990s.

== History ==
=== Origins ===
The site was first known as the Nassour Studios, built in 1946 and opened January 1, 1947 by brothers William and Edward Nassour (1911–1962). Over 100 independent films were shot there under the Nassour Studios banner. Originally, there were four sound stages ranging in size from around 7,600 square feet (710 m^{2}) to just over 13,000 square feet (1,200 m^{2}). Nassour's modern Art Deco-styled projection room and modern offices were located in the buildings fronting Sunset Boulevard.

Dressing rooms were constructed adjacent to stages 1 and 2. An old converted two story apartment building located down the street on Van Ness housed producers and writers. The largest stage, stage 4, had removable panels that hid a water tank. It was used to film the jungle river scenes in 1949's Africa Screams. The lot was very small (about four acres) so an underground facility for storage was necessary. A large freight elevator was installed for access.

=== A major television facility ===
In 1950, the Nassour brothers sold their studio to the Times Mirror Company, publisher of the Los Angeles Times. Times-Mirror was looking for a facility to permanently house KTTV (channel 11), its new television station (at the time, owned jointly with CBS) which commenced broadcasting the previous year. The facility was later renamed KTTV Studios.

The New York City-based firm Metromedia purchased the property along with KTTV in 1963. In 1967 Metromedia undertook an extensive renovation and expansion of the facility, which included renovating two of the existing studios, as well as a new office tower and building housing various Metromedia enterprises, including the Harlem Globetrotters, the Ice Capades, the Foster & Kleiser advertising firm and Wolper Productions, the latter of which was purchased by the company in 1964. The renovation also brought about a name change, from KTTV Studios to Metromedia Square (also referred to as Metromedia West). Los Angeles radio stations KLAC and KMET (now KTWV), which Metromedia purchased in separate 1963 and 1965 transactions, moved there in 1976.

In 1975, further expansion was made, with the addition of a 40,000 square-foot building with offices, dressing rooms and rehearsal space, as well as more soundstage renovation (bringing the total to 5 altogether; by the time the facility was demolished, the studio count had increased to 6); 4 video editing bays were added by 1983. As a result of the increased work (as Metromedia expanded their production of programming for first-run syndication via their Metromedia Producers Corporation division, in addition to external clients, including Norman Lear's shows and production of television commercials), Metromedia established the MetroTape division to provide videotape and production services (functioning autonomously from their television and radio arms); accordingly, the Metromedia Square facilities became known under the alternate banner of MetroTape West. The truss-like, lattice steel work of art sculpture, "Starsteps" was added to the building's roof on the north side of the property above the Hollywood Freeway (US 101) in 1981. In 1982, a satellite uplink facility was created for use by the Satellite News Channel, a joint venture of Group W and ABC (with KTTV handling the production of regionalized news updates); after SNC's closure in 1983, the uplink was subsequently reused by SYNSAT, a joint venture of Group W Productions and Nolo Communications designed to streamline distribution of television and film programming.

Television producer Norman Lear moved into the property in 1973 and headquartered his company, Tandem Productions, in the building. Lear started videotaping his television series here in the fall of 1975, including but not limited to: All in the Family; Diff'rent Strokes; The Jeffersons; Maude; Good Times; Hello, Larry; One Day at a Time; and The Facts of Life. One of his other shows, Sanford and Son, remained taped at NBC Studios in Burbank; its 1980 revival, Sanford, was videotaped at Metromedia. Shows such as Diff'rent Strokes, The Facts of Life, One Day at a Time, and The Jeffersons later relocated to Universal City Studios by 1982.

=== Later years ===
In 1986, Metromedia sold most of its television interests to News Corporation, and KTTV became a cornerstone station of the new Fox Broadcasting Company. As a result, the studios became the Fox Television Center, though Metromedia continued to own the building and the land on which it was situated, leasing the property to Fox and KTTV.

The Fox Broadcasting Company launch announcement was made from the property, and on October 9, 1986, the flagship show was broadcast live, The Late Show Starring Joan Rivers. Shows like the Metromedia and then Fox-produced Small Wonder and NBC's Saved by the Bell, as well as the direct-to-syndication seasons of Mama's Family, the sketch comedy series In Living Color, and the first season of MAD TV were among the later series to be taped at this complex. Additionally, the 1992-93 season of Married... with Children was taped at this complex after moving out of Universal City and while what are now Sony Pictures Studios were being renovated. Ironically, very few Fox television shows were actually taped at the Fox Television Center; however, it did serve as the network's technical center, with all programming for Fox's prime-time and late-night lineups, as well as Fox Kids Network programming, being uplinked to satellite from here (with a brand-new uplink facility created in 1992, in part to handle news backhaul feeds for use by the network's affiliates). Uplinking was handled by the Fox Tape division, formerly MetroTape, which also uplinked syndicated programming from 20th Television.

When Fox Sports began operations in 1994, studio programming such as Fox NFL Sunday began to originate from here, along with studio content for Fox Sports Net when that venture launched in 1996. To accommodate the vast infrastructure necessary for live sports programming, millions of dollars' worth of new equipment and expansion to the Fox Television Center were necessary; this included a seventh studio exclusively for sports coverage, multiple new control rooms, the technology necessary to keep the "Fox Box" scorebox updated, Chyron graphics machines, and specialized recordable LaserDisc players.

KTTV moved to their own new building (the present-day Fox Television Center) in West Los Angeles in 1996, which is the corporate home of the Fox Television Stations group. Meanwhile, the radio stations' studios remained there, even long after they were no longer owned by Metromedia. KTWV, now owned by Audacy, moved to new studios in Culver City in 1997, and then Miracle Mile neighborhood on L.A.'s Wilshire Boulevard on February 18, 2013. KLAC eventually became acquired by Clear Channel Communications (now iHeartMedia) and moved to studios shared with Clear Channel's other AM and FM stations, which are now located in Burbank.

The Fox Broadcasting Company, which had maintained some business offices at the 20th Century Fox studios in Los Angeles' Century City neighborhood while at the Television Center, moved its complete base of operations to a new facility on the Century City studio lot shortly after the KTTV move; plans were announced for this facility in June 1997, by which time Fox's lease on the facility from Metromedia had run out (and construction on the new facility in Century City was ahead of schedule). This new facility, known as the Fox Network Center, is the home to the network's live studio productions (certain Fox Sports Net productions instead originated from a facility located in the Westwood district), and serves as the technical center of the Fox network (with Fox's satellite feeds beginning origination from the Network Center on December 31st, 1997).

Metromedia sold the land to the Los Angeles Unified School District in 2000; the famed "starsteps" were dismantled and shipped to Chicago. The building was demolished by the school district in 2003 and replaced with Helen Bernstein High School, which opened in 2008.

== List of shows recorded at Metromedia Square ==
- 227 (1985–87; remainder of series taped at Sunset Gower Studios)
- All's Fair (1976-1977)
- All in the Family (1975–1979)
- Baby Makes Five (1983)
- The Baxters (1979–1981)
- Catchphrase (1985–86)
- Celebrity Bowling (1971-1978)
- Checking In (1981)
- College Football Saturday (studio portions of national telecasts on Fox Sports Net, 1997)
- Concentration (syndicated version; for its entire run, 1973–1978)
- The Cross-Wits (1975-1980)
- Diff'rent Strokes (1978–1982)
- Divorce Court (1957–1966)
- The Edge (for its entire run, 1992-1993, except pilot which was recorded at Universal City Studios)
- The Facts of Life (1979–1982)
- Family Ties (pilot episode only, 1982)
- Fernwood 2 Night/America 2 Night (1977-1978)
- Finders Keepers (1988-1989)
- Fox Sports News (1996-1998)
- The fX Sports Show (1995-96)
- The 5 Mrs. Buchanans (for its entire run, 1994–95)
- Gimme a Break! (for its entire run, 1981–1987)
- Good Times (1975–1979)
- Highcliffe Manor (1979)
- Homeroom (1989)
- The New Hollywood Squares (1987-1988)
- I've Got A Secret, hosted by Steve Allen (syndicated version; 1972–1973)
- In Living Color (for its entire run, 1990–1994)
- Insight (1976–1980)
- The Jeffersons (1975–1982)
- Joe's World (1979–1980)
- Hello, Larry (1979–1980)
- Hello Out There (1949)
- In the Beginning (1978)
- Jeopardy! (current syndication version; first season, 1984–1985)
- Liar's Club (1969-1970)
- The Last Word with Jim Rome (1998)
- Love Connection (1983-84)
- MAD TV (1995–1996)
- Mama's Family (syndicated version, not the NBC seasons; 1986–1990)
- Mary Hartman, Mary Hartman (pilot episodes 1 and 2 only)
- Maude (1975-1978)
- MLB on Fox (studio portions, pregame and postgame shows, 1996-1997)
- Married... with Children (1992-1993)
- The $100,000 Name That Tune (1976–1981)
- NFL on Fox (studio portions, incl. Fox NFL Sunday, 1994-1998)
- NHL on Fox (studio portions, pregame and postgame shows, 1995-1998)
- One Day at a Time (1975–1982, except the pilot)
- Punky Brewster (1984-1986)
- Sanford (for its entire run, 1980–1981)
- Silver Spoons (pilot episode only, 1982)
- Small Wonder (for its entire run, 1985–1989)
- Soul Train (1971–1981)
- Star Search (1983-84)
- Studs (1991-1993)
- The Cheap Show (1978)
- The Late Show, with Joan Rivers through Ross Shafer (1986-1988)
- The National Easter Seal Telethon (1979?-1984)
- The People's Court (1982-87)
- Thicke Of The Night (1983-84)
- Three's Company (1977, 1982–1984)
- Too Close for Comfort (syndicated version, 1984–1986)
- Truth or Consequences (syndicated version for its entire run, 1966–1978)
- Welcome Back, Kotter (1978–1979)
- The Woody Woodbury Show (1967-1968)
