= Andy Adler =

American journalist

- Television Journalist Andy Adler
- Born: August 19, 1986 (age 40)
- Education: Stanford University (BA)
- Occupations: Television personality, journalist

Andy Rosa Adler (born August 19, 1986) is a Emmy-nominated American television journalist, sports anchor, interviewer and children’s author. A bilingual broadcaster and native Spanish speaker, Adler was the first female lead sports anchor in the New York television market. Her broadcasting career has included serving as a morning news anchor for NBC Los Angeles and as a lead sports anchor in New York and Dallas. She has co-hosted pregame and postgame programming for major professional sports franchises, including the New York Yankees, New York Giants, Los Angeles Lakers, and Dallas Cowboys.

During her career, Adler has worked across news and sports for Fox, NBC, PIX11, YES Network, CBS, and regional sports networks.

Adler is also the author of the children’s picture book Andy Pandy.

== Early life and education ==
Adler is of Mexican heritage. Spanish was her first language, and she grew up bilingual in Spanish and English. Adler attended Stanford University, where she graduated with honors. Early in her career, she interned for Late Show with David Letterman and participated in the NBC Page Program. Adler has worked in television since the age of 20.

== Broadcasting Career ==
=== Fox 5 New York ===
Andy Adler at the Milken Global Conference

Adler worked at WNYW (Fox 5 New York) as a sports anchor and as a primary fill-in host of Good Day New York. She also co-hosted the station’s Sports Extra. During her tenure at Fox, Adler covered the New York Giants, New York Jets and New York Yankees. She served as the field reporter during the Giants’ run to their Super Bowl XLII victory and covered the Yankees’ 2009 World Series Championship. Adler also covered the MLB All Star Game and hosted coverage of the New York City Triathlon in 2008 and 2009. During this period, she made appearances on Fox Business Network and hosted New York City’s Brazilian Day celebration twice.

=== NBC Los Angeles and Los Angeles Lakers ===
In 2010, Adler joined KNBC as a morning news anchor, co-anchoring the weekend edition of Today in LA. She also worked as a weekday news reporter, hosted a weekly sports segment, and appeared on MSNBC and NBC Nightly News. Adler subsequently joined Time Warner Cable SportsNet’s Los Angeles Lakers coverage. During the 2012–13 season, she co-hosted Lakers pregame, halftime and postgame programming alongside former NBA players James Worthy, Robert Horry and Kurt Rambis. She also hosted Access SportsNet, a live nightly program covering Southern California sports.

=== PIX11 New York and YES Network ===
Adler returned to New York in 2014 to join Pix 11 News as its lead sports anchor. She later served as sports director and hosted PIX11 Sports Desk. During her tenure, Adler covered New York’s major professional sports teams and hosted pregame programming involving the Yankees, Giants and Jets. She also contributed to YES Network programming and co-hosted Yankees pregame and postgame coverage. Adler became known for long-form interviews with prominent athletes and sports figures. Her interview subjects included Magic Johnson, Alex Rodriguez, Derek Jeter, Pelé, Kareem Abdul-Jabbar, Kobe Bryant and Eli Manning. Adler left WPIX after eight years, during which she also served as sports director and oversaw the station’s sports department.

=== One on One with Andy Adler ===
While at PIX11, Adler created, produced and hosted One on One with Andy Adler, an interview series centered on in-depth conversations with prominent figures in sports. The series received an Emmy nomination and expanded through a collaboration with Sports Illustrated.

=== CBS News Texas and Dallas Cowboys ===
Andy Adler at work

Adler joined KTVT/CBS News Texas in Dallas–Fort Worth in 2022 as a lead sports anchor and also contributed to national CBS Sports coverage. At CBS, she covered the Dallas Cowboys and co-hosted Cowboys pregame and postgame programming. She traveled with the team for coverage and conducted one-on-one interviews with Cowboys players and other figures in professional sports. Adler also anchored news programming and appeared in CBS Sports coverage, including Super Bowl programming.

== Andy Pandy ==
Adler is the author of the children’s picture book Andy Pandy, illustrated by Andy Elkerton. The story centers on Andy Pandy, a spirited bilingual young girl with pink hair who is teased for looking different and speaking Spanish. After discovering a magical microphone, Andy Pandy becomes a young sports reporter and embarks on adventures with a flying pink skateboard and her elephant companion, Pinky. Andy Pandy was selected by PureWow as one of its top three new children’s books.

== Other media appearances ==
Adler has made national television appearances on MSNBC, NBC Nightly News, Fox Business Network, and CBS Sports programming.

She has also made cameo appearances, including in the film Fast Five, starring Dwayne Johnson and Gal Gadot.

== Philanthropy ==
Adler is an ambassador for Children’s Health Fund and World of Children. She has been a longtime supporter of World of Children and has served as a co-chair and master of ceremonies for the organization’s Summer Classic fundraiser. She has also participated in the organization’s annual awards events and served as an honorary chair.

Adler has worked with the Children’s Health Fund since 2014, including hosting and participating in fundraising events. Her charitable work has also included emceeing events benefiting AHRC and the National Alliance on Mental Illness (NAMI), as well as multiple other organizations and initiatives focused on children and families.

== Personal Life ==
She is a native Spanish speaker and a member of Mensa.
