= Jean Martirez =

American news anchor (born 1963)

- Born: January 19, 1963 (age 63); Chicago, Illinois, U.S.
- Education: University of Missouri
- Occupation: News anchor
- Employer: KTTV (1995-2012)
- Spouse: Timothy J. Barton
- Children: 2
- Awards: Emmy Award

Jean Martirez (born January 19, 1963) is a Filipino-American newscaster who formerly co-anchored the KTTV FOX 11 Morning News for 17 years, with Tony McEwing.

== Background ==
=== Personal ===
Martirez was born in Chicago, Illinois where her parents met. She is a first generation Filipino-American and is of mixed Filipino and Spanish heritage. Martirez attended the University of Missouri, where she was a member of Alpha Chi Omega sorority, and graduated with a Bachelor of Arts degree in journalism. Martirez lives in Malibu, California with her husband and two children.

=== Career ===
Martirez began her broadcasting career working as a weekend anchor and reporter for KOMU in Columbia, Missouri. She then moved on to WXII in Winston-Salem, North Carolina where she worked as a morning anchor and reporter. She was then hired as an anchor and reporter for the Harlingen, Texas CBS-affiliate KGBT. She then relocated to San Antonio, Texas where she began working for ABC-affiliate KSAT as a morning anchor.

Martirez joined KTTV in October 1995 as a general assignment reporter for the station's morning news and its Good Day LA program.

Prior to arriving at KTTV Martirez worked at the Denver CBS-affiliate KCNC anchoring their morning newscasts. In Denver from 1993–1995, Martirez hosted an Emmy Award winning syndicated children's newsmagazine News for Kids.

In early October 2012, Martirez stopped appearing on the Fox 11 Morning News. This led many people to speculate whether Martirez had been axed from Fox after seeing the departures of Dorothy Lucey and Jillian Reynolds. Jean quickly denied rumors by stating on Twitter that she was still with the show and just on sick leave. A few days later she finally hinted at her departure in a tweet that she had cleaned out her desk. Lucey soon confirmed Martirez's departure on her blog.

== Awards and nominations ==
- 2007, Emmy Award nomination
- 2009, Emmy Award nomination
