= The Story Is with Elex Michaelson =

- Genre: News
- Presented by: Elex Michaelson

Production
- Production locations: CNN Los Angeles bureau, Burbank, California
- Camera setup: Multi-camera
- Running time: 120 minutes

Original release
- Network: CNN; CNN International
- Release: October 27, 2025 – present

Related
- Erin Burnett OutFront; The Source with Kaitlan Collins; Anderson Cooper 360°; CNN NewsNight with Abby Phillip; Laura Coates Live

The Story Is with Elex Michaelson is an American late-night news program on CNN. Premiering on October 27, 2025, and airing from 9–11 p.m. PT (12–2 a.m. ET) on weeknights, the program is anchored by Elex Michaelson from CNN's Los Angeles bureau in Burbank. The program is also aired globally on CNN International, part from on Saturdays when CNN International leaves the program 30 minutes before its conclusion to show magazine programming.

== History ==
In January 2025, it was reported that Jim Acosta had declined an offer by CNN to anchor a new late-night news program for the network out of Los Angeles. Some CNN employees believed that the program was a ploy to move Acosta (who, at the time, hosted a midday hour of CNN Newsroom) to a lesser-viewed timeslot due to his history of being critical towards Donald Trump, amid attempts by the network under Warner Bros. Discovery ownership to attract conservative viewers. On January 23, CNN announced a new schedule that replaced Acosta's program with The Situation Room; five days later, Acosta announced that he had departed the network.

In August 2025, long-time KTTV Fox 11 anchor Elex Michaelson announced that he was departing the station to pursue a new opportunity; Michaelson had hosted KTTV's weekly public affairs show The Issue Is, and had become prominent for his interviews and discussions with local, state, and national political figures. On September 11, 2025, CNN announced that Michaelson had joined the network, and would host a new late-night program from Los Angeles on CNN and CNN International beginning in October. The title of the program was later announced as The Story Is with Elex Michaelson, with a premiere set for October 27. CNN stated that the program would feature panel discussions, as well as coverage of "sport, health, technology, entertainment and more".

Michaelson had pitched a Los Angeles-based late-night newscast to CNN in the past, while The Los Angeles Times noted that California state politics had become increasingly prominent in national news, including a 2025 proposition to redistrict the state amid gerrymandering pushes ahead of the 2026 midterms, as well as Governor Gavin Newsom and former vice president Kamala Harris being considered potential figures in the 2028 presidential elections. Michaelson explained that "although it’s a fight in California, the impact will be felt not just around the country but around the world." Of Michaelson's previous tradition of giving his guests baked goods from his mother, he noted that due to the show's length and number of nightly guests, "we may need to revise that". The Story Is is CNN's first Los Angeles-based program since Larry King Live.

The Story Is is currently the only regularly-scheduled program to air live after midnight ET across the major US cable news channels (a daypart that had typically been populated by reruns of their respective primetime programs); Fox News @ Night had previously aired at midnight ET, but moved to 11 p.m. after a 2023 realignment of its prime time schedule.

Preceded by Laura Coates Live	CNN Weekday lineup 12:00 am – 2:00 am	Succeeded by CNN Newsroom Live
