= KTTV =

Television station in Los Angeles

- Los Angeles, California; United States
- Channels: Digital: 11 (VHF); Virtual: 11
- Branding: Fox 11 Los Angeles; Fox 11 News

Programming
- Affiliations: 11.1: Fox; for others, see § Subchannels

Ownership
- Owner: Fox Television Stations, LLC
- Sister stations: KCOP-TV

History
- Founded: 1947
- First air date: January 1, 1949
- Former channel numbers: Analog: 11 (VHF, 1949–2009); Digital: 65 (UHF, 1998–2009)
- Former affiliations: CBS (1949–1951); DuMont (1951–1954); Independent (1954–1986)
- Call sign meaning: "Times Television" (for its founding owner, the Los Angeles Times)

Technical information
- Licensing authority: FCC
- Facility ID: 22208
- ERP: 115 kW
- HAAT: 903 m (2,963 ft)
- Transmitter coordinates: 34°13′29″N 118°3′51″W
- Translator(s): see § Translators

Links
- Public license information: Public file; LMS
- Website: www.foxla.com

KTTV (channel 11) is a television station in Los Angeles, California, United States. It is the West Coast flagship station of the Fox television network, owned and operated through its Fox Television Stations division. Under common ownership with KCOP-TV (channel 13), the two stations share studios at the Fox Television Center on South Bundy Drive in West Los Angeles; KTTV's transmitter is located atop Mount Wilson.

== History ==
=== Early years (1947–1954) ===
KTTV's origins can be traced to 1947, when the station's license and construction permit was secured by the Times Mirror Company, publishers of the Los Angeles Times. It was one of five licenses that were granted simultaneously by the Federal Communications Commission (FCC) to parties interested in expanding commercial television in Los Angeles. In 1948, CBS, which owned KNX radio, purchased a 49% interest in the station and assisted in completing its construction in exchange for making channel 11 the network's Los Angeles television outlet. KTTV began operations on January 1, 1949, and was operated initially by KTTV, Incorporated, the Times/CBS-owned holding company. The station's first telecast was the Tournament of Roses Parade, which channel 11 would air every New Year's Day until 1995.

In May 1950, Times-Mirror purchased the Nassour Studios – a large motion picture facility on Sunset Boulevard in Hollywood, and centralized KTTV's operations there. CBS did not join Times-Mirror in the purchase; at the time its West Coast production facilities were based at Columbia Square, with its CBS Television City facility in the planning stages. KTTV converted the Nassour Studios into a major production house for television, producing programs locally and for the emerging syndication market. Prior to the move, KTTV operated out of several different facilities, including the former headquarters of Capitol Records (which was later the longtime home of KHJ radio and what is now KCAL-TV) on Melrose Avenue.

Later in 1950, CBS chose to acquire its own station in Los Angeles – pioneer station KTSL (channel 2, renamed KNXT and now KCBS-TV) – which was being spun off by the Don Lee Broadcasting System as a result of its sale to General Tire and Rubber. The KTSL purchase forced CBS to divest its interest in KTTV due to FCC rules in effect at the time that barred the common ownership of two television stations in the same media market; the Los Angeles Times would regain full ownership of channel 11 when the sales were finalized on January 1, 1951. KTTV's relationship with CBS ended after exactly two years as the network moved its programming to KTSL. A few months later, channel 11 agreed to become the new Los Angeles outlet of the DuMont Television Network, which had been affiliated with KTSL, and before that KTLA (channel 5).

=== Independence (1954–1986) ===
In 1954, DuMont moved its programming to KHJ-TV (channel 9, now KCAL-TV), and KTTV became an independent station. During the late 1950s, the station was also briefly affiliated with the NTA Film Network. In 1958, channel 11 scored an advantage against its rivals when it became the television home of the Los Angeles Dodgers baseball team, which had relocated from Brooklyn, New York, that year. For the first 11 years and at the request of the team, KTTV's Dodger telecasts were limited to road games against the archrival San Francisco Giants. Eventually, the number of Dodger games broadcast on the station increased and the home game blackout was lifted; the relationship between KTTV and the Dodgers would last until the end of the 1992 season.

The show Confidential File on KTTV covered the 1962 convention of the Daughters of Bilitis and aired after Confidential File became syndicated nationally; this was probably the first American national broadcast that specifically covered lesbianism.

The Times-Mirror Company sold the station to Metromedia in 1963. Later that year, Metromedia purchased KLAC (570 AM) and the original KLAC-FM (102.7 FM, now KIIS-FM), giving channel 11 sister stations on the radio dial. Metromedia would later engineer a trade of FM frequencies, resulting in KLAC-FM moving to 94.7 FM (later to become KMET, now KTWV) in 1965.

By the 1970s, KTTV offered a traditional general entertainment schedule common among independent stations at the time, consisting of children's programs, off-network reruns, sports programming and old movies, along with a 10 p.m. newscast. Some of the staff members in the earlier 1970s were John Jones, Sales Manager; George Putnam, news anchorman; Putnam's co-anchor Hal Fishman; Ken Jones, first black on-air TV newsman in L.A.; Tom Kelly, TV sports reporter; Terry Mayo, noontime news; and Rona Barrett, who taped her syndicated gossip report at KTTV, written by assistant Barbara Sternig. With the evolution of cable television, KTTV became a regional superstation. Thanks to its Dodgers broadcasts and round-the-clock programming, KTTV was seen on various cable systems across the Western United States during the 1970s and into the 1980s, as far east as El Paso, Texas. KTLA, with its Angels broadcasts, also became a superstation. KTTV and KTLA were seen on most Southern and Central California cable systems, with KHJ-TV and KCOP also getting carried outside Los Angeles to a lesser extent.

In 1973, as part of an agreement signed with four citizen groups and filed with the station's renewal application, KTTV removed 42 animated programs from its schedule or consideration from purchasing from syndicators, deemed as featuring 'violent content' inappropriate for children, most notably Popeye, Superman, Batman and Aquaman, while applying a "caution to parents" warning to 81 live-action titles aired before 8:30 p.m., with the group's major highlight series being The Outer Limits.

=== As a Fox-owned station (1986–present) ===
In 1986, Australian newspaper publisher Rupert Murdoch and his company, the News Corporation (which had acquired a controlling ownership interest in the 20th Century Fox film studio the year before), purchased KTTV and the other Metromedia television stations. The Metromedia stations ended up becoming part of a new holding company formed by News Corporation called Fox Television Stations; those stations formed the basis for the new Fox Broadcasting Company television network, which made its debut on October 9, 1986. Following the News Corporation purchase, KTTV added more first-run syndicated talk, court and reality shows. By the early 1990s, it began to run afternoon cartoons from the network's Fox Kids block (which debuted in 1990), as well as top-rated off-network sitcoms during the evening hours. KTTV removed cartoons on weekday mornings in June 1993, due to the launch of the morning newscast Good Day L.A.

In 1996, KTTV relocated its longtime studios on Sunset Boulevard in Hollywood, known as "Metromedia Square" (and later renamed the "Fox Television Center") to a new studio facility a few miles away on South Bundy Drive in West Los Angeles, near the Fox network headquarters (the network's headquarters are located on the 20th Century Fox studio lot). Several television series were filmed at the historic Metromedia Square television studio (which was once home to Norman Lear's Tandem Productions and TAT Communications Company) such as The Jeffersons, Mama's Family, Diff'rent Strokes, One Day at a Time, Soul Train, Mary Hartman, Mary Hartman, Fernwood 2 Night and the groundbreaking sketch comedy In Living Color. Many of those programs, either in first-run or off-network syndication, aired on KTTV. The Metromedia complex was demolished in 2003 to make way for the construction of Helen Bernstein High School (which is part of the Los Angeles Unified School District).

In 2001, Fox Television Stations acquired several UPN affiliates owned by Chris-Craft Industries through its BHC Communications station group, creating a duopoly between KTTV and KCOP-TV (channel 13). That fall, channel 11 dropped the Fox Kids weekday block and moved it to KCOP; Fox Kids discontinued its weekday block altogether in January 2002, with the lineup left airing only on Saturday mornings. Since the 4Kids block was replaced by Fox with the infomercial block Weekend Marketplace in December 2008, the station now airs five hours of educational programming, two more than required under FCC guidelines, as Xploration Station replaced Weekend Marketplace, which moved to KCOP, in September 2014.

KTTV also airs reruns of I Love Lucy, which had premiered in 1951, months after the station lost its CBS affiliation. Reruns of the sitcom are still popular among Southern California viewers and have continued to air in the Los Angeles market perpetually since the series ended its run in 1957, thus making KTTV only the second station in the market (the other being KCBS-TV) to continue airing the sitcom since it ended. Weekday airings of I Love Lucy have since moved to KCOP (which airs the program in a one-hour block), but KTTV continues to air the landmark sitcom on weekends during the late afternoon hours.

On May 16, 2006, KTTV launched a new website based on Fox Television Stations' MyFox interface; this format became standard on the websites of each of the Fox-owned stations – and was even adopted by some of Fox's affiliates not owned by the network – by the end of that year (the "MyFox" branded websites were operated by former News Corporation subsidiary EndPlay until 2012, when the sites were migrated to the WorldNow platform).

KTTV launched the Light TV network on a subchannel starting December 22, 2016, with another Fox TV station, WNYW.

On December 14, 2017, The Walt Disney Company, owner of ABC and KABC-TV, announced its intent to buy KTTV's parent company, 21st Century Fox, for $52.4 billion; the sale excluded the Fox Television Stations unit (including KTTV and KCOP), the Fox network, Fox News, Fox Sports 1 and the MyNetworkTV programming service, which were transferred to a separate company.

== Programming ==
=== Sports programming ===
Since the team's move to Los Angeles in 1958 (with exception of a brief pause from 1993 to 1995), KTTV has carried Los Angeles Dodgers baseball games from varying sources; the station aired road games beginning in the late 1970s with the home games on the subscription/pay-per-view service Dodgervision; these road games aired on the station until 1992, when KTLA began airing the road games beginning with the 1993 season. Currently, select Dodger games are broadcast nationally through the network's sports division via its MLB package since 1996. KTTV has also aired the Dodgers' 2017, 2018, 2020, 2024, and 2025 World Series appearances, including the team's championship victories in 2020 (their first title in 32 years), 2024, and 2025. All other Dodger games are currently broadcast locally through SportsNet LA.

KTTV also airs any Angels games that are aired through Fox's MLB contract, including the team's World Series victory in 2002. Since 2024, KTTV broadcasts select Anaheim Ducks games through an agreement with sister station KCOP.

From 1972 to 1974, the station also carried games involving the Los Angeles Sharks of the WHA.

With the return of the Rams franchise to Los Angeles, since 2016, KTTV has been the 'unofficial home' for the Los Angeles Rams through the network's primary rights of the National Football Conference. It had held this role for one season in 1994 prior to their move to St. Louis (that same year, Channel 11 aired two home interconference contests featuring the Raiders during their last season in Los Angeles). During the NFL regular season, Rams games are rotated with KNBC (through NBC Sunday Night Football), KABC-TV (through Monday Night Football simulcasts from ESPN as well as national ABC broadcasts) and most especially KCBS-TV (through the NFL on CBS). Since 2017, it has also broadcast Los Angeles Chargers games featuring a visiting NFC team, or games that are cross-flexed from CBS, with some select games from either team carried by KCOP if both teams are playing at the same time. Beginning in the 2018 season, the station began airing Thursday Night Football which is simulcast on NFL Network and if either one of the two LA teams are playing it serves as the local area station for gameday telecasts, even if it is exclusive to NFL Network. This practice has generally continued even after Amazon Prime Video began airing games in 2022.

=== News operation ===
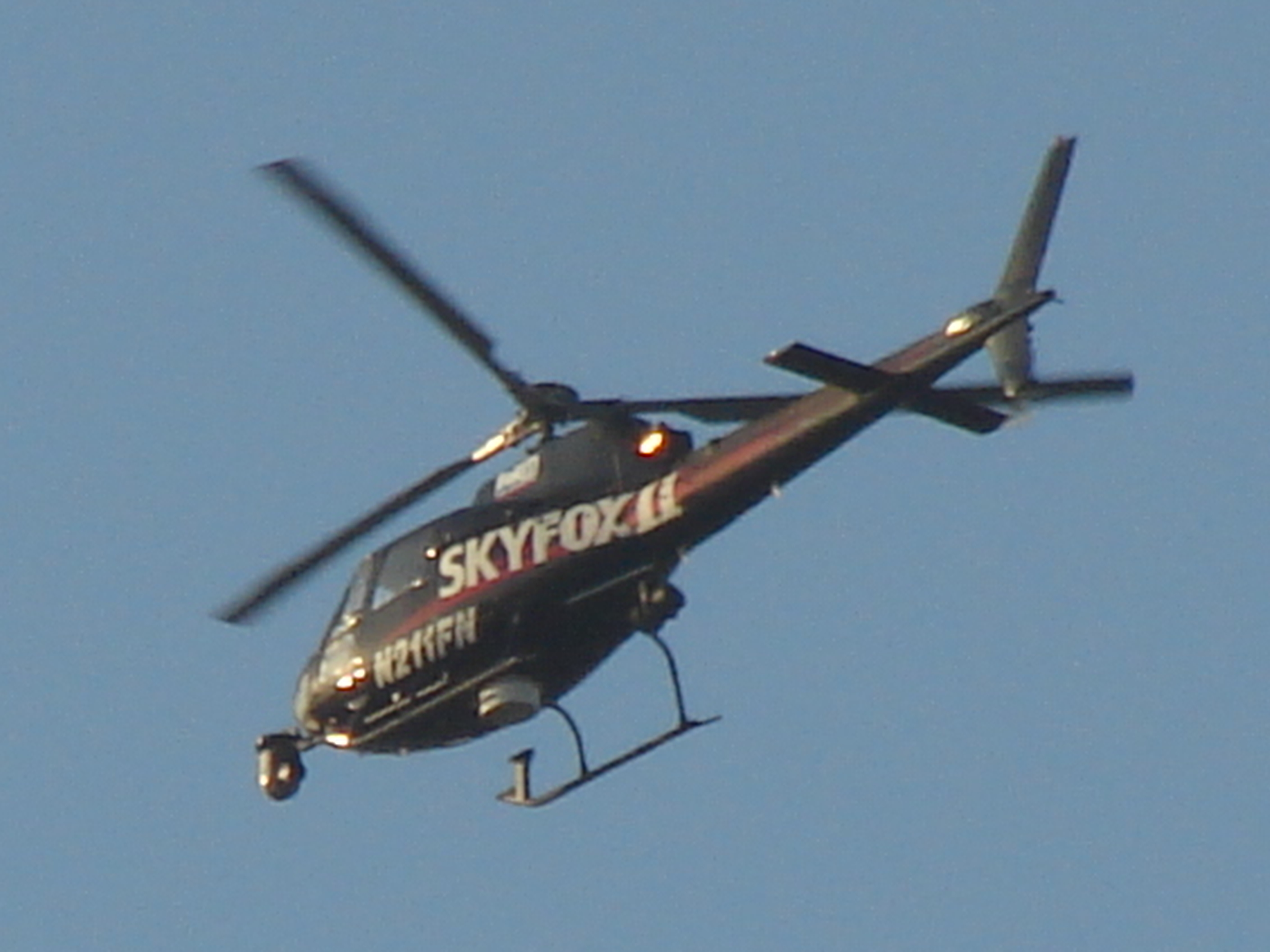
Former SkyFox Eurocopter

KTTV presently broadcasts 64 hours of local newscasts each week (with 12 hours each weekday and two hours each on Saturdays and Sundays); this gives KTTV the second-largest local news output of any television station in the Los Angeles market, behind CW owned-and-operated station KTLA's 105 hours, 55 minutes of weekly newscasts. The station also produces The Issue Is:, a political discussion program hosted by Elex Michaelson which airs Friday nights at 10:30 p.m. and is also syndicated to other Fox stations across California, including KTVU in the San Francisco Bay Area and KSWB-TV in San Diego. As is standard with Fox stations that carry early evening weekend newscasts, KTTV's Saturday and Sunday 5 p.m. newscasts are subject to delay or preemption due to network sports coverage.

KTTV operates a Bell 407, branded on-air as "SkyFox", to provide aerial coverage of breaking news stories. KTTV previously operated two helicopters; one of them (known as "Sky Fox 2") was destroyed after it crashed at Van Nuys Airport in 2000.

Throughout its history, the station has always operated a news department, partly owing to its former ties to the Los Angeles Times. KTTV aired an 8 p.m. newscast from 1984 to 1987; it also briefly moved its 10 p.m. newscast to 11 p.m. in 1986, in order to compete with existing local newscasts in that same timeslot on KABC-TV, KNBC and KCBS-TV; the newscast's format initially was unchanged, but the 8 p.m. edition was later dropped while the 11 p.m. newscast reverted to its previous 10 p.m. slot shortly after News Corporation took over Metromedia in the fall of 1987. During this time period, the station also experimented with newscasts at midday and midnight.

In June 1993, the station launched a new morning news program called Good Day L.A., a program that was inspired by sister station WNYW's Good Day New York, which debuted in 1988. On July 14, 2008, KTTV launched a half-hour 10 a.m. newscast, following Good Day L.A., as the station's first midday newscast since the mid-1980s; KTTV is currently the only station in Los Angeles to have a local newscast in that timeslot. KTTV and KCOP began producing its local newscasts in high definition on October 15, 2008. On December 1, 2008, KTTV fully took over production of KCOP's 11 p.m. newscast, which was reduced from an hour to 30 minutes and retitled Fox News at 11, marking the end of a KCOP-produced and branded newscast. The newscast on channel 13 then became anchored by KTTV's 10 p.m. anchors Carlos Amezcua and Christine Devine, as it was considered an extension of the earlier newscast (in the case of KCOP, all of its newscasts on that station were eliminated on September 22, 2013).

On December 8, 2008, KTTV debuted a half-hour midday newscast at noon on weekdays. On April 27, 2009, KTTV introduced Good Day L.A. Today, a recap program airing at 12:30 p.m. weekdays that featured select segments featured on that day's edition of Good Day L.A.; that show has since been replaced by TMZ on TV. On April 12, 2010, the station expanded its weekday morning newscast by a half-hour to 4:30 a.m. Until September 12, 2011, KTTV was one of only two Fox owned-and-operated stations (the other being Chicago's WFLD) that did not have an early evening newscast on weeknights and/or weekends; this changed when KTTV launched an hour-long 5 p.m. newscast on that date called Studio 11 L.A. On June 30, 2014, KTTV expanded its noon newscast from 30 minutes to 1 hour.

On April 28, 2016, KTTV changed the name of its 5 p.m. newscast to Fox 11 5:00 News using the same anchors from Studio 11 L.A. Weekend early evening newscasts became known as Fox 11 Weekend News.

In September 2018, KTTV canceled its half-hour 10 a.m. newscast.

On December 10, 2018, Fox 11 Morning News adopted the Good Day L.A. branding, expanding the newscast from 7 a.m. to 4:30 a.m.

On April 1, 2019, Good Day L.A. expanded from 4:30 a.m. to 4 a.m.

In September 2022, Good Day L.A. expanded to 10 a.m., running until 11 a.m. KTTV also cancelled its mid-day newscast in the same month.

In May 2026, the 4 a.m. hour of Good Day L.A. was dropped. Encores of the previous day's Extra and TMZ episodes now air in that time slot.

==== Anonymous news report ====
On July 26, 2007, KTTV aired a report on the hacktivist group Anonymous, calling them a group of "hackers on steroids", "domestic terrorists", and collectively an "Internet hate machine". The report, which became the source for numerous internet memes, featured an unnamed former "hacker" who had fallen out with Anonymous and explained his view of the Anonymous culture. In addition, the report also mentioned "raids" on Habbo, a "national campaign to spoil the new Harry Potter book ending", and threats to "bomb sports stadiums".

==== Notable current on-air staff ====
- Christine Devine – anchor (1990–present)
- Laura Diaz – reporter (2012–present)
- Araksya Karapetyan – anchor (2012–present)
- Jennifer Lahmers – anchor (2023–present)
- Maria Quiban – weather anchor (2000–present)
- Gina Silva – general assignment and investigative reporter (2001–present)

==== Notable former on-air staff ====
- Carlos Amezcua – anchor, 2007–2013
- John Beard – anchor, 1993–2007
- Rod Bernsen – helicopter reporter
- Tony Cox – anchor/reporter
- Steve Edwards – anchor, 1995–2017
- Hal Fishman – anchor/reporter
- Courtney Friel – reporter
- David Garcia – anchor/reporter
- Lisa Joyner – entertainment reporter
- Steve Kmetko – reporter, 2007–2008
- Carol Lin – weekend anchor/reporter
- Dorothy Lucey – Good Day L.A. co-host/entertainment anchor
- Jean Martirez – former morning anchor
- Lisa McRee – former fill-in anchor
- Elex Michaelson – anchor, 2017–2025
- Antonio Mora – anchor
- Michaela Pereira – anchor/reporter, 2020–2022
- George Putnam – anchor
- Jillian (Barberie) Reynolds – Good Day L.A. co-host/weather reporter, 1995–2012
- Bill Ritter – reporter
- Lauren Sanchez – former entertainment reporter, special projects reporter, and fill-in anchor
- Maria Sansone – Good Day LA co-host and anchor
- John Schwada – political reporter
- Mark Thompson – chief meteorologist/local program host, 1992–2011
- Jane Wells – reporter
- Bill Welsh – reporter

== Technical information ==
=== Subchannels ===
The station's signal is multiplexed:

Subchannels of KTTV
| Subchannel | Res. | Short name | Programming |
|---|---|---|---|
| 11.1 | 720p | KTTV-DT | Fox |
| 11.2 | 720p | FOX-WX | Fox Weather |
| 11.3 | 480i | ROAR | Roar |
| 11.4 | 480i | CATCHY | Catchy Comedy |
| 13.4 | 480i | HEROES | Heroes & Icons (KCOP-TV) |

Broadcast on behalf of another station

=== Analog-to-digital conversion ===
KTTV shut down its analog signal, over VHF channel 11, on June 12, 2009, as part of the federally mandated transition from analog to digital television. The station's digital signal relocated from its pre-transition UHF channel 65, which was among the high-band UHF channels (52–69) that were removed from broadcasting use as a result of the transition, to its analog-era VHF channel 11.

=== Translators ===
- K21MH-D Daggett
- K27ON-D Lucerne Valley
- K06IQ-D Newberry Springs
- K17GJ-D Twentynine Palms

== See also ==
- KTTV/KTWV Tower
