= The 9 on Yahoo =

Daily video compilation show by Yahoo! (2006–2008)

The 9 was a daily video compilation show, or vlog, on Yahoo! featuring the nine top web finds of the day. The 9 was launched on Yahoo!'s homepage (and Yahoo! TV) on July 10, 2006. The show, hosted by Maria Sansone, followed a similar format to other pop culture list shows on cable TV and the internet, such as VH1's Best Week Ever, Bub.blicio.us's Tech Soup, and E!'s The Soup. In 2006, Time named The 9 one of the top "50 coolest websites." The 9 was canceled on March 31, 2008.

== Format ==
The 9 featured a countdown alongside the site's video player that featured nine numbered buttons, each labeled with a particular featured item and a web site. The host, Maria Sansone, introduced each of the nine stories and the "viewer" can then opt to click on and go to any story that interests them. Viewers are encouraged to vote on their favorite stories or submit their own. The options and interactions that the viewers may demonstrate are characteristic of what the future of news, information, and entertainment dissemination will look like. On October 19, 2006, the show switched out of beta and earned a new studio.

=== Features ===
- Pepsi Tenth - a feature where "viewers" can submit websites that the producers of The 9 missed. Every day, one (sometimes more) of the nine websites is a "Pepsi Tenth" site.
- The 9 Awards - On December 21, 2006, the first 9 Awards was hosted. This was the end of the "9 Pan-denominational Holidays" which included daily, an item that you would not want to get as a holiday present. On this day, awards were given out (for example, "Best Use of a Waterpark") to the people hosted on The 9. The Best Pepsi 10th winner won a year's supply of Pepsi.
- The Back 9 - On February 3, 2007, the Back 9 was introduced. It allows viewers to explore websites in a more organized fashion. Categories include Maria's Favorites, Featured, Celebrity, Event, Music, Entertainment, and Sports.
