= Paul Magers =

American news anchor and reporter

Paul Magers (born May 15, 1954) is an American former news anchor and reporter, most recently at KCBS-TV in Los Angeles, California.

Magers was born in Santa Maria, California, and spent the majority of his childhood in Ellensburg, Washington. He earned his bachelor's degree from the University of Washington in 1977. In 1979, he earned his Juris Doctor degree from the Hamline University School of Law in St. Paul, Minnesota.

The recipient of numerous industry awards, including several Emmys and a Golden Mike Award, Magers began his broadcasting career at KSTP-TV in Minneapolis-St. Paul, then moved in 1979 to KATU in Portland, where he began working as an on-air reporter. In 1981, he moved down the West Coast to KGTV-TV in San Diego, where he spent two years as a reporter and anchor before he returned to the Twin Cities and began his 20-year career with KARE-TV. Paul and 10:00 p.m. co-anchor Diana Pierce both joined the station in September 1983 and remained together on that newscast until September 2003. Magers moved to KCBS-TV in Los Angeles in 2004.

In addition to anchoring the evening newscasts, he hosted numerous specials and moderated political debates and participated in a wide variety of community events, including a 1997 telethon to raise money for flood relief in Minnesota.

Magers announced his retirement from television broadcasting in March 2017, revealing his long struggle with alcoholism.
