= Rod Bernsen =

American journalist and police officer

Roderick Bernsen
- Born: 1948 (age 77–78)
- Other name: Rod
- Relatives: wife, sister Corbin Bernsen (cousin)
- Police career
- Department: Los Angeles Police Department
- Service years: 1974 - 1992
- Rank: Sworn in as an Officer (1974); Police Officer II; Police Officer III (1984); Sergeant I (1987)
- Other work: reporter

Roderick Bernsen (born 1948) is a retired Los Angeles Police Department sergeant who was widely known in Southern California as a police news-specialist for Fox 11 News, and for flying the station's helicopter, "SkyFox," while with Good Day LA.

== LAPD career ==
Bernsen spent almost 18 years with the LAPD. He rose to the rank of sergeant and served as one of the department's official spokespersons for six years as part of Daryl F. Gates's Press Relations Staff. He also served as technical advisor for the film Lethal Weapon

== Broadcasting career ==
After retiring from the LAPD in 1992, Bernsen joined Fox 11 as a reporter/specialist. Eventually, he became a broadcaster and helicopter reporter with Fox 11's Good Day LA program, and served as an occasional reporter/police news-specialist for both CNN Headline News and Fox News. He retired from Fox 11 in 2004, continuing to serve as a talk-show host on KFI Radio until 2006. Bernsen now hosts his own internet radio lecture show, Rod Bernsen's Street Stories on TalkRadioOne . .

== False sexual misconduct charges ==
On October 7, 2006, Bernsen was arrested by FBI agents on false charges of two counts of abusive sexual contact against a minor. Bernsen told investigators that he had the boys kicked out of the sauna. The case went to trial in June 2007. Bernsen was acquitted of all charges on June 12, 2007 after a week-long federal jury trial; the jury deliberation lasted less than two hours. He was facing up to four years in federal prison if convicted. After his acquittal Bernsen said, "...more needs to be done to ensure that children do not make false allegations against adults." Bernsen said that they were lying, possibly because he had had them barred from the ship's sauna earlier in the cruise. Bernsen also told reporters that despite the quick jury acquittal, he would have to live with this: "all you have to do is Google my name."
