= Gina Silva =

American broadcaster

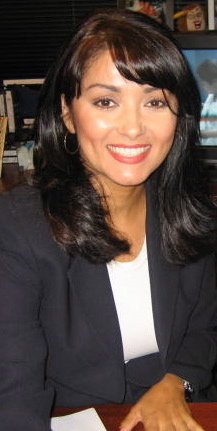

Gina Silva is an American television newscaster and reporter.

Silva was born to migrant farmworkers in the Mexican state of Chihuahua. Silva went to high school in Texas and graduated from the Walter Cronkite School of Journalism and Mass Communication at Arizona State University. While at Arizona State University, she worked for Phoenix's Univision station, KTVW. After that, she worked at several TV stations, initially under the name Virginia Silva, including KOLD-TV in Tucson, Arizona; KCOP-TV in Los Angeles; and KNXV-TV in Phoenix, where she was an investigative reporter. Silva considered her best work to that time to be at KNXV, but a change in the station's news direction left her unhappy and prompted her departure.

After leaving KNXV, Silva sent her resume to consultant Don Fitzpatrick, who sent out a demo tape containing a story on Mexican witchcraft. That drew the interest of the syndicated entertainment newsmagazine Extra, for whom she worked between 1997 and 2000. During this time, she also hosted a syndicated series, Viva Hollywood!, profiling Hispanics in entertainment. Silva returned to KCOP in 2001 as a reporter and back-up anchor. Shortly after, Fox Television Stations—owner of KTTV—acquired KCOP, with its departments merging under Fox leadership. As of 2025, Silva is the special projects reporter for KTTV.
