= Dorothy Lucey =

American actress

- Dorothy Lucey at the red carpet of the 2006 American Idol Season Finale
- Occupation: Entertainment reporter

Dorothy Lucey is an American entertainment reporter who formerly co-hosted Good Day L.A., the morning news program on Los Angeles Fox affiliate KTTV for 17 years.

== Career ==
Lucey was an on-air reporter for WNEP-TV in Scranton, Pennsylvania and WABC-TV in New York City (including a stint alongside Regis Philbin), and later joined NBC Sports. She was also a co-host of Attitudes, a talk show on Lifetime Television in the 1990s. In 1992, she hosted the CBS series How'd They Do That.

Lucey joined Good Day LA in 1995 as the show's entertainment reporter. Much of the show's formula consists of wide-ranging banter between the three anchors. She also has had bit roles in a few movies and TV shows, often playing as a TV reporter.

Lucey's 17-year run with Good Day LA came to an end on May 25, 2012, as a result of non-renewal of her contract.

== Personal life ==
Lucey regularly discusses her religious revival - she converted from Roman Catholicism to a devout form of Presbyterianism several years ago. On the October 26, 2006 broadcast of Good Day L.A., she described herself as a "liberal Christian."

== Filmography ==
| Year | Title | Role | Notes |
|---|---|---|---|
| 1996 | My Fellow Americans | News Anchor | |
| 2001 | Behind Enemy Lines | Herself | |
