= Steve Edwards (talk show host) =

American talk show host

Steve Edwards (born Steven Edward Schwartz on August 23, 1948, in New York City) is an American television and radio personality in Los Angeles, known mostly for local morning shows, including AM Los Angeles, 2 On The Town, and Good Day L.A.. From 2001 to 2005, he hosted the nationally syndicated companion Good Day Live, which aired on many Fox-owned and affiliated stations. Currently he is a regular fill-in host at KABC radio as well as hosting two podcasts, OK LA, with former co-hosts Jillian Barberie and Dorothy Lucey, and Steve Edwards Confessions, consisting of in-depth interviews.

== Dismissal ==
KTTV announced on December 11, 2017, that Edwards "is no longer employed" by the station amid sexual harassment allegations. His dismissal came during the #MeToo movement.

== Biography ==
Edwards began his broadcasting career in the late 1960s with KMSC radio (now KMJQ) in Houston. He later moved to KTRH, where he hosted a nighttime call-in show. While in Houston, he also worked at CBS television affiliate KHOU-TV as a news anchor. In the mid-1970s, he worked at WLS-TV in Chicago as host of AM Chicago and Friday Night with Steve Edwards.

In 1978, Edwards moved to Los Angeles, where he hosted Two on the Town with Connie Chung before getting his own talk show. While at KNXT (later KCBS-TV). he also served as entertainment editor and as a weatherman. He worked on The Baxters, a sitcom produced by Norman Lear, and hosted On Stage America.

Edwards appeared as a correspondent for Entertainment Tonight for one season before moving to KABC-TV in 1984 to host A.M. Los Angeles with Cristina Ferrare, and his own talk show on KABC-AM.

Edwards returned to television in 1993 with Live in L.A. on KCAL-TV, before becoming an anchor and host of Good Day L.A. in 1995. Through the years Edwards has hosted numerous unsold pilots for network series. Edwards also filled in for both Chuck Woolery and Michael Burger on Family Channel's talk show Home & Family.

== Awards and honors ==
Edwards has received the Governor's Award from the Academy of Television Arts & Sciences and has a star on the Hollywood Walk of Fame.
