= Araksya Karapetyan =

Armenian-born American television personality and anchor woman

- Born: August 27, 1982 (age 44); Leninakan, Armenian SSR, Soviet Union
- Citizenship: United States
- Education: S. I. Newhouse School of Public Communications, Syracuse University (B.A.)
- Occupations: TV anchor and reporter
- Employer: FOX11 Los Angeles
- Television: KTTV (2012-)
- Spouse: Amir Yousefi
- Children: 2

Araksya Karapetyan (Armenian: Արաքսյա Կարապետյան; born August 27, 1982) is an Armenian-born American television personality and anchor woman for the Los Angeles–based KTTV FOX11's Good Day L.A.

She is recognized as the first American-Armenian mainstream television anchor and reporter in the Southern California media market.

== Early life ==
Karapetyan was born on August 27, 1982, in Armenia's second largest city of Gyumri (then called Leninakan). She witnessed the 1988 Armenian earthquake that left her native city devastated. In an article written following a March 17, 2014, earthquake in Los Angeles, Karapetyan wrote: "Every time we get a shaker here in Southern California I quickly have a flashback to my childhood. I was 6-years old in 1988 when a devastating earthquake hit my hometown in Gyumri." Meanwhile, the ethnic conflict with Azerbaijan intensified as the Soviet Union was on its way to collapse. Due to these hardships her family emigrated to the United States in 1990. She grew up in Palos Verdes Estates, California and attended Palos Verdes Peninsula High School.

== Education and career ==
She graduated from Syracuse University's S. I. Newhouse School of Public Communications with a degree in international relations and broadcast journalism. Karapetyan began her television career as an intern at KABC-TV in Los Angeles and KFI 640 AM radio in Burbank, California. In the past, she has also worked for KIDK-TV in Idaho Falls, Idaho (as reporter, anchor and producer), KOIN-TV in Portland, Oregon (as a reporter and host) and as a reporter at CitiCABLE, a government access cable television channel for the City of Torrance, California.

== Personal life ==
Karapetyan is fluent in English, Armenian and is "conversational" in Russian and Spanish. She is married to Amir Yousefi and they have two daughters.
