= Living in the Age of Airplanes =

2015 IMAX documentary film

- Theatrical release poster
- Directed by: Brian J. Terwilliger
- Written by: Brian J. Terwilliger; Jessica Grogan; Daniel Oppenheimer
- Produced by: Brian J. Terwilliger; Bryan H. Carroll
- Narrated by: Harrison Ford
- Cinematography: Andrew Waruszewski
- Edited by: Brad Besser
- Music by: James Horner
- Production company: Terwilliger Productions
- Distributed by: National Geographic Films
- Release dates: April 6, 2015 (Emirates); April 8, 2015 (NASM); April 10, 2015 (theatrical)
- Running time: 47 minutes
- Country: United States
- Language: English
- Box office: US$8,011 (Australia and United Kingdom)

Living in the Age of Airplanes is a 2015 American epic documentary film written, directed, and produced by Brian J. Terwilliger. Narrated by Harrison Ford, it explores the way commercial aviation has revolutionized transportation and the many ways it affects everyday lives, and it concludes with a positive endorsement of flying. The film's themes include connections and perspectives, using several cinematographic styles to convey its message.

Terwilliger conceived the idea of the film in 2007, two years after releasing his feature directorial debut One Six Right. He intended it as a reliving of the feeling of flying for the first time and a celebration of the aviation industry. Production began independently in 2009, with filming taking place a year later in eighteen countries across all seven continents, becoming the first IMAX film to be made on such a scale. It used the first entry of the Arri Alexa digital camera. Filming took over 100 days. Post-production took place between 2013 and 2014. James Horner, who died in 2015, composed the score later released in 2016. (Horner was a licensed pilot and the only occupant of his turboprop aircraft when he died in its crash near Ventucopa, California months after film release.) Despite having 260 hours of raw footage, the film becomes only 47 minutes long when edited and divided into five chapters.

Living in the Age of Airplanes was initially planned to be released as Aviation: The Invisible Highway before National Geographic Films acquired it for distribution. It premiered on April 6, 2015, on a special Emirates flight, before its theatrical release on April 8. Ford's accident in his airplane just before the premiere attracted more interest in the film. It was released for streaming and on home video in 2016. Critics praised its technical and narrative aspects, but some felt it lacked in discussing the history and disadvantages of aviation; fans of One Six Right were disappointed by its difference. Terwilliger disagreed with most of the criticisms. The film won three awards, two of which in regards for Horner's score.

== Summary ==
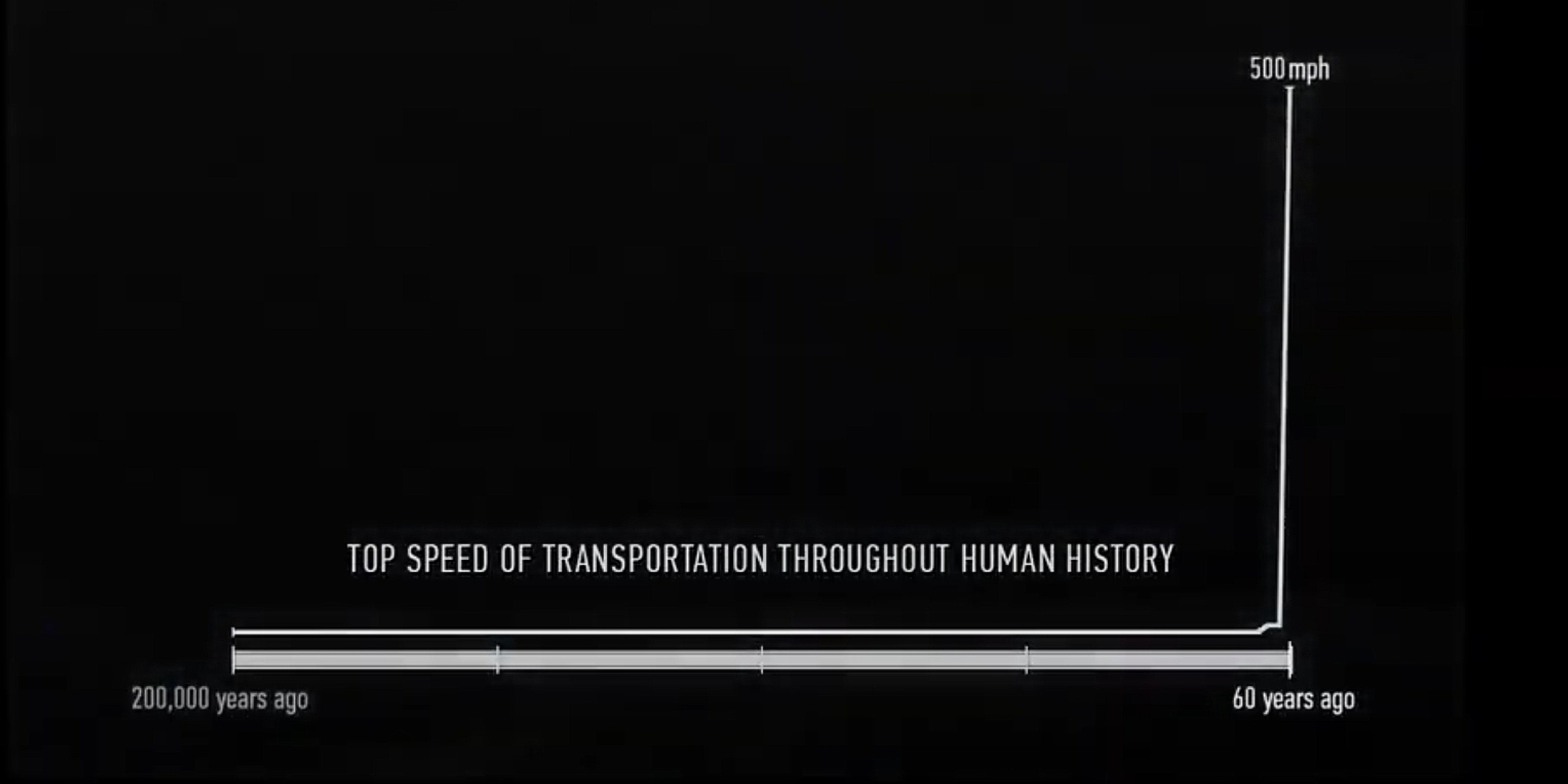
A graph from the film, depicting the speed of transportation throughout 200,000 years of history.

Living in the Age of Airplanes is divided into five chapters and opens with a quote from Bill Gates: "The airplane became the first World Wide Web, bringing people, languages, ideas, and values together".

The first chapter, "The World Before the Airplane", observes that the first mode of transportation, walking, took "a lifetime". Geographically isolated, humans mapped the universe before the Earth and were unaware of other cultures. Walking remained the only transportation for over 195,000 years until the invention of the wheel. 4,500 years later came the advent of mechanical transportation, which, though faster and more efficient, was still restricted by the nature of land and sea. Airplanes are considered revolutionary; where others could only travel at around 10 miles per hour (16 km/h), they could fly at speeds up to 500 miles per hour (800 km/h); they can also cross land and sea, and do not mandate airports.

The second chapter, "The Portal to the Planet", says aviation is crucial to connecting the world with its diverse landscapes and cultures. Daily, around 100,000 take-offs and landings occur, and over 250,000 people fly "at any moment in time". The third chapter, "Redefining Remote", depicts Maldives, a country that is accessible with seaplanes, since its small islands and shallow waters make airports difficult to build and ships impossible to approach. Despite the difficult terrain, airplanes can reach Antarctica, making it accessible to tourists and researchers. The fourth chapter, "The World Comes to Us", depicts cargo aviation, which allows products to be quickly shipped worldwide; flowers' perishable nature had restricted shipments to just country-wide, but with cargo, they can be shipped anywhere long before they perish. With air travel, Las Vegas became the largest economic hub; hence, those who have never flown are also indirectly impacted by aviation.

The final chapter, "Perspective", laments that flying has become ordinary and lost its joyousness, becoming frustrating instead. However, the film says, "every era is a golden age, it's just a matter of perspective", encouraging audiences to appreciate the present moment and asking them to imagine a world without aviation. It then says no technology can replace aviation's ability to bring people physically close on such a scale. After saying "the most meaningful [place one could go with airplanes] is home", it ends with footage of landed passengers embracing their waiting loved ones.

== Production ==
=== Pre-production ===
In 2005, Brian J. Terwilliger released his feature directorial debut One Six Right, which focuses on general aviation from the viewpoint of pilots, under his company Terwilliger Productions. It has since gained a cult following among aviation enthusiasts. In 2007, he conceived the idea of a film focusing on the impact of commercial aviation on society. He planned the film would give context to aviation to relive its wonder and hoped audiences would "not look at flying the same way again". He described the film as a "love letter" to the aviation industry.

Terwilliger wrote the narration with Jessica Grogan, and Daniel Oppenheimer wrote additional narration. The working title was Aviation Epic, in reference to the film's large scale and ambitious nature. Terwilliger chose to show the difficulty of pre-aviation life to make the film relatable, and gave it a philosophical theme, comparing aviation to the Internet, which "could help us share ideas and communicate with other people so quickly now. We can create another [t]weet and the whole world knows what you are thinking in seconds."

According to Terwilliger, pre-production included months of getting filming permits and finding crew members who would help the filming process, such as language interpreters and drivers. He considered the logistical aspect of production the most challenging. He initially pitched the idea to National Geographic Films but decided to keep the production independent, as he had on One Six Right, to make it true to his vision, worrying National Geographic would try altering his ideas and become involved in the production process, losing his creative control. According to him, the film's budget was relatively high. The film was first announced without a title on September 15, 2014, in an interview with podcast Film Courage. Amid pre-production, a short film called Flying Full Circle, in which Terwilliger flew with the Blue Angels, was made.

=== Filming ===
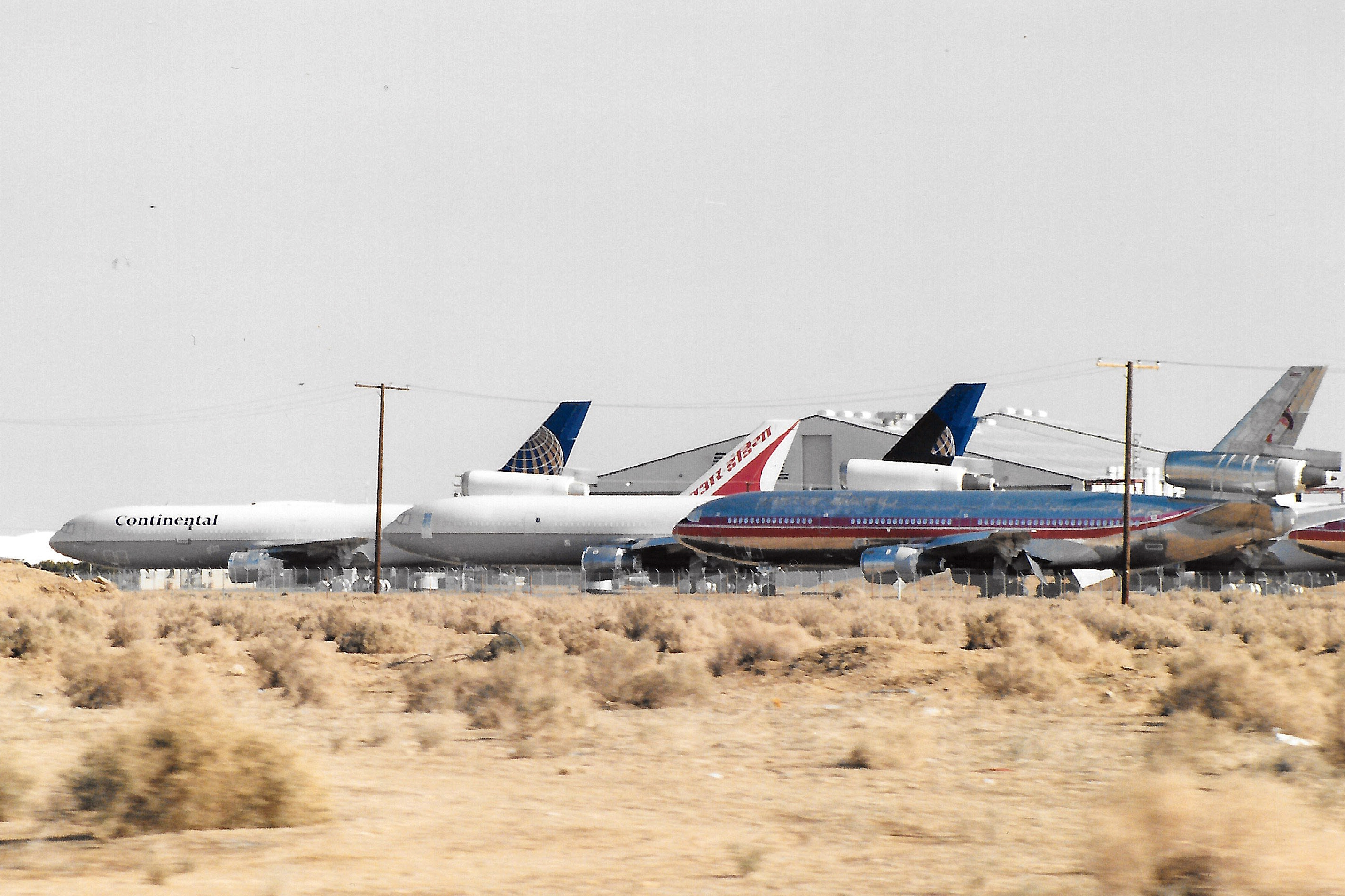
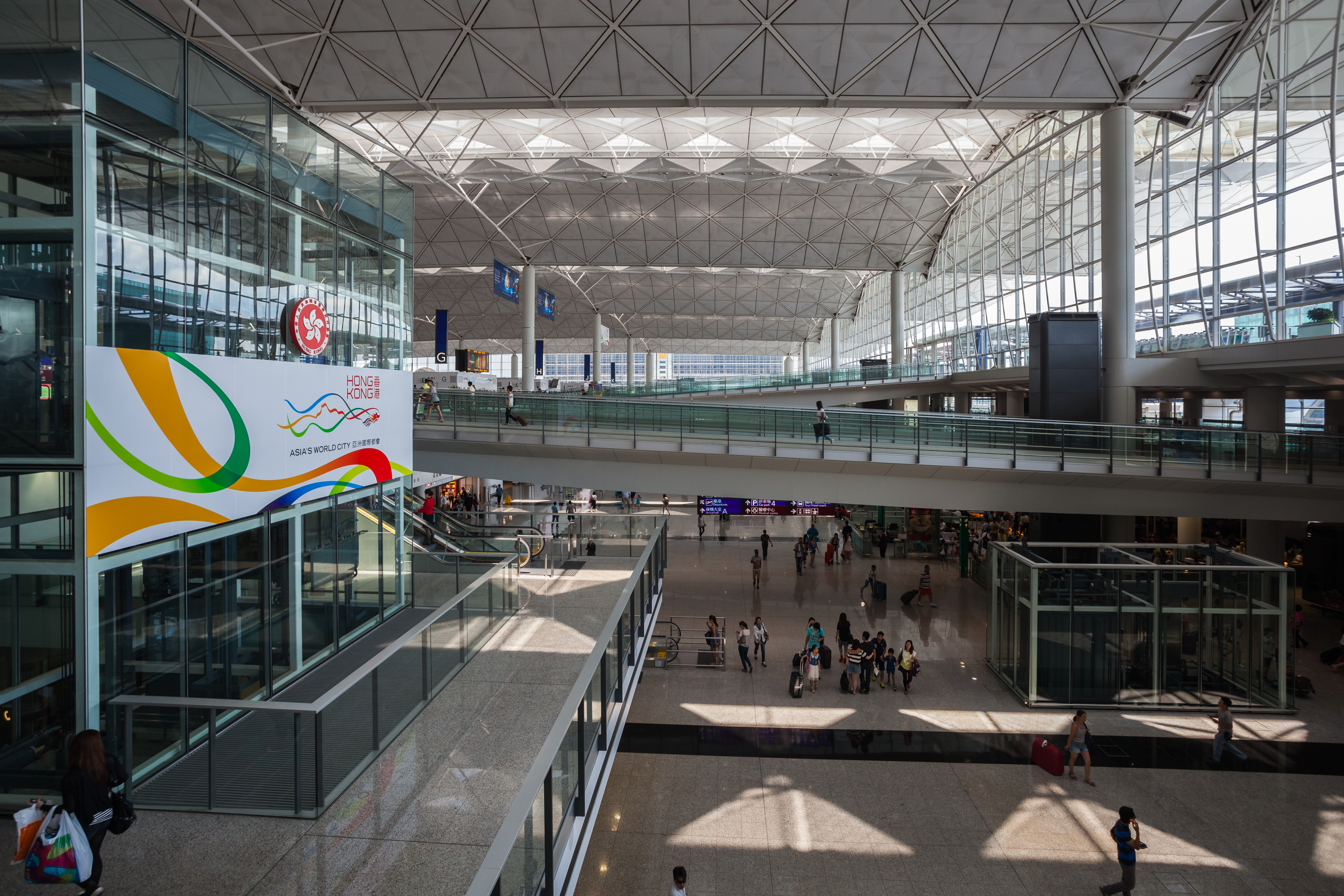
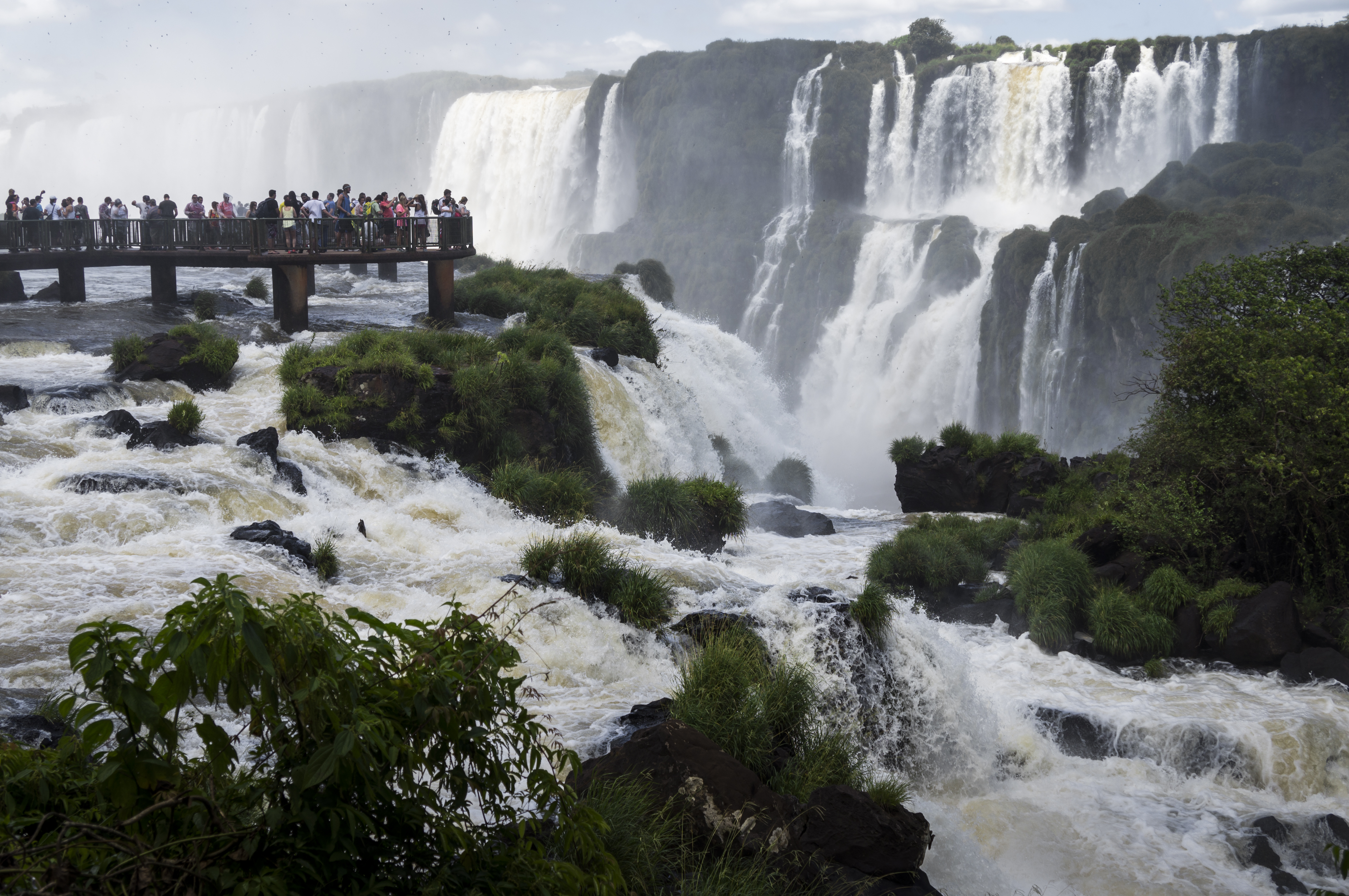
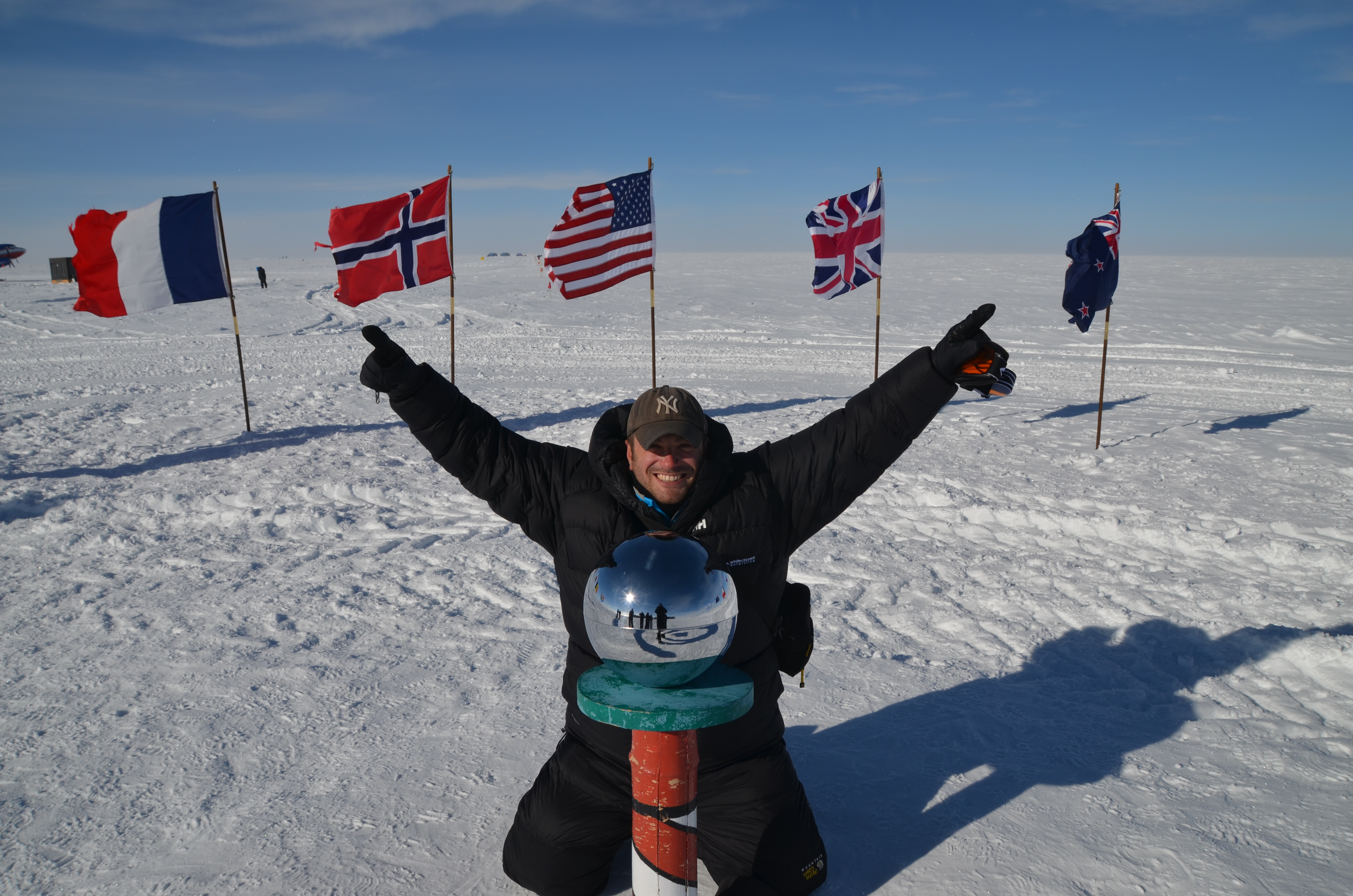
The Mojave Air and Space Port, Hong Kong International Airport, Iguazu Falls, and South Pole, four of the many locations in Living in the Age of Airplanes

Principal photography was done in 95 locations, in 18 countries on all seven continents, the first IMAX film at such scale. Within the United States, they filmed in Alaska, Arizona, California, Hawaii, Nevada, North Carolina, Tennessee, and Utah.

Filming began in 2010 when the first Arri Alexa camera was released; the crew decided to purchase its seventh iteration before the model was made available to the public. They were unable to use film cameras due to financial and logistical shortcomings. Other filming equipment included prime and zoom lenses, a triangular jib, sound equipment, and various kinds of support, which weighed over 160 lb (73 kg). Terwilliger remarked, "Just getting to the locations could be a real challenge. One day in Costa Rica, we went to shoot suspension bridges and ended up hiking [4.5 miles (7.2 km)] in and out of the forest with all this gear. [H]alf the job is carrying equipment, the other half is actually shooting."

There were four skeleton crews. Andrew Waruszewski, who had filmed documentaries for National Geographic, was engaged as cinematographer upon recommendation to Terwilliger by producer Bryan H. Carroll. Terwilliger said Waruszewski had the attention to detail and level of commitment he was looking for. Discussions about the cinematography included symmetry and tone; Terwilliger wanted every shot in the film to look "like a commercial".

The crew began filming in Mojave Air and Space Port, the first scene in the film, and continued to the GE Aviation and Airbus factory, where components for an Emirates Airbus A380 were being assembled. A Canon EOS 5D was used for time-lapse sequences, which were photographed by Ben Wiggins, who was of the splinter unit: at times separate from the main crew, and at times would leapfrog each other. In scenes such as those featuring Hunts Mesa, he would have two 5Ds; one still and another doing a hyperlapse. Meanwhile, Terwilliger had Doug Allan filming the South Pole scenes for 11 nights. Despite his experience of living in Antarctica, Allan had never visited the South Pole until then. Helicopters were used for aerials except for those in the Maldives, where a seaplane was used because helicopters are outlawed. Other cinematographers shot aerial and underwater scenes in Australia, Kenya, the Maldives, and the US. Some scenes were filmed in a Qantas Airbus A380 flying a Los Angeles-Sydney route.

In "The World Comes to Us", Terwilliger chose a flower as the primary object to depict cargo aviation because it is "timeless", culturally appreciative, and perishable. The film crew followed a shipment of roses from Kenya as they traveled to an Alaskan house, transiting at an Amsterdam warehouse and Memphis International Airport. When they arrived at the house and began setting up their filming equipment, the roses arrived. Terwilliger wanted the roses to have arrived from Kenya to make the film's message genuine.

Although some shots were planned using flight data from FlightAware, some were impromptu at the cost of the crew staying in the locations for extra days. Impromptu shots include those of airplanes flying above ancient monuments, "juxtaposing the old and the new", and a shot of a Trans Maldivian Airways seaplane nearing a shipwreck, which required the crew to organize with the pilots. At times, the crew would revisit prior filming locations to reshoot. Generally, the crew stayed a few days at each location; they spent 16 days in the Maldives, with poor weather further extending it. Terwilliger considered the entire Maldivian scene the best.

In some instances, poor weather prohibited filming; in one instance, San Francisco fog filled up the Golden Gate Bridge as they intended to film it from a location they reserved for only a day. The shot of a hermit crab crawling over the Maldivian sands took two hours to film while the crew instructed the crab to move in the required direction; prior, several other crabs were "auditioned". According to Terwilliger, he and the crew felt privileged they "got to experience many things that [the] film talked about". Filming ended in 2012, lasting over 100 days. The crew filmed 260 hours of footage, only 47 minutes of which were used because IMAX theaters have hourly showtimes. According to Terwilliger; "We just shot and shot and shot, even though I know we'll never use this ... Most of the time I was right: We didn't use it. But sometimes we did. When you have those options later, it's a beautiful thing."

=== Post-production ===
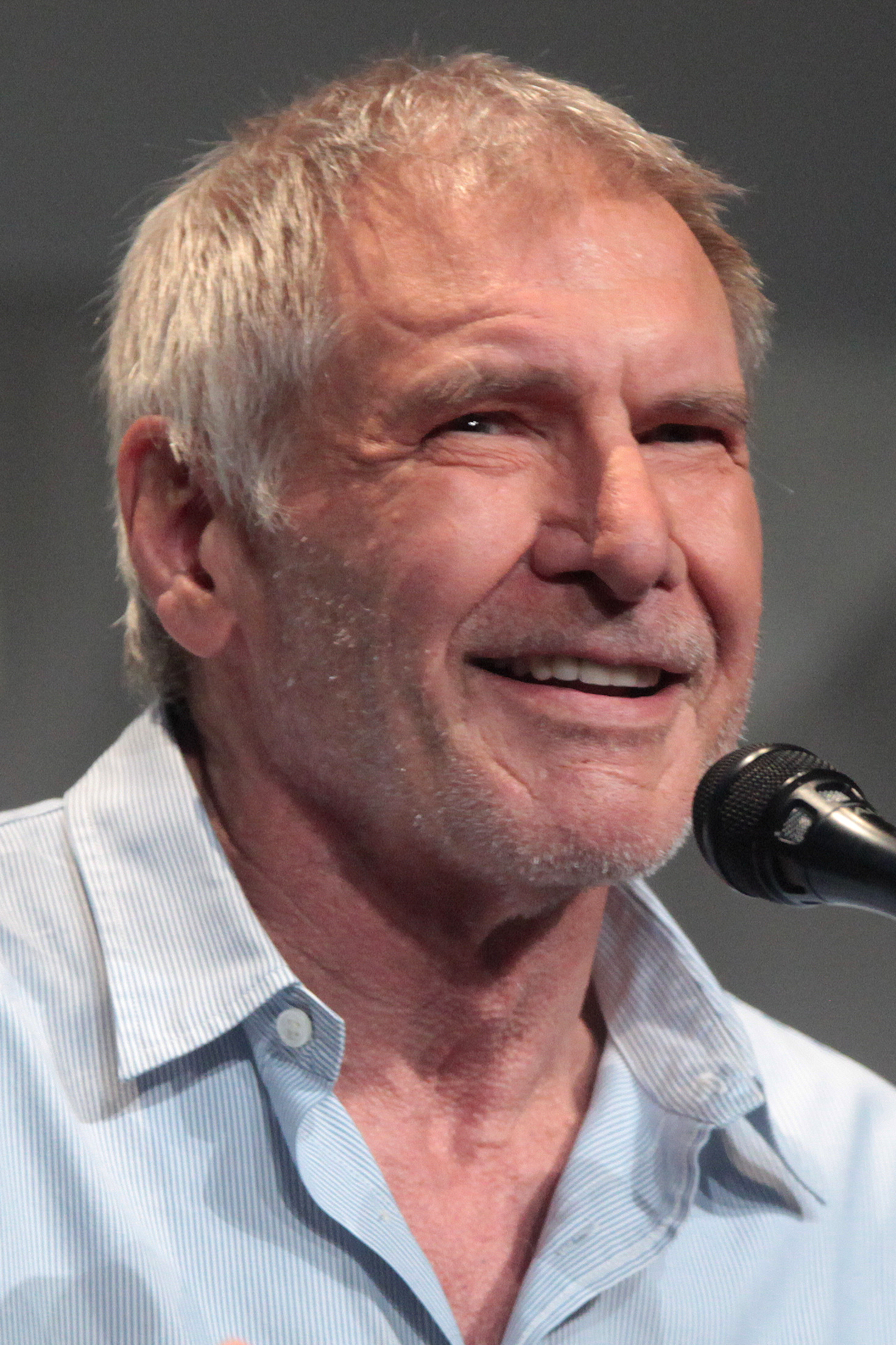
Harrison Ford in 2015

Terwilliger wanted an A-list narrator and score composer for the film, and wanted the narrator to have experience with aviation. Harrison Ford, who is also a pilot, recognized Terwilliger from One Six Right and accepted his offer to narrate the film, which was done over three days in early 2014. Ford narrated the entire rough cut of the film, watching it five times to "get into the character". James Horner befriended Terwilliger in 2008 at an air show; he agreed to compose the score. His goal was to provide a spiritual feeling to match the film's tone, also marrying aviation and music. It was released digitally in a soundtrack album on September 14, 2016, coinciding the film's digital and physical release. It was released in CD through Intrada Records on August 23, 2017.

The film's five-chapter structure was not conceived until editing began in 2014. Brad Besser, who has worked on The Pacific, was chosen as the film's editor; he and Terwilliger had "gathered clips from the Internet to build a rough video storyboard for the entire film" before filming. Because of the film's non-linear nature, Terwilliger described dividing it into chapters as a challenging process. There are some subtle stories—a frustrated family is seen at the beginning, but is revealed at the end to be waiting for a loved one, though those were not planned.

Choosing which shots to use was also noted to be frustrating, though it was simplified by removing shots depicting poor weather. Archival and stock footage were licensed from Periscope Films, the Mitch Dakleman Collection, the UCLA Film & Television Archive, and Budget Films. Visual effects for the Earth and flight patterns were produced by Whiskytree, for disappearing infrastructure by Identity FX, and for the three-dimensional text tracking by Legion Studios. According to Terwilliger, the visual effects required people in creative and technical fields to form a perfectly shaped Earth, as a photorealistic Earth is subjective. The last shot of Earth features lights of flight patterns from FlightAware as seen on July 24, 2014.

Because the film was shot digitally, it had to be transferred to 15/70 and 65/70mm celluloid prints by RPG Productions and FotoKem, respectively, for IMAX purposes. Cinelicious did the telecine and restoration of the 16mm format.

== Themes and style ==
Shot of an African tree, which is the second shot of "The World Before the Airplane". Terwilliger said that it represents the continent as the "heart" of the film.

Living in the Age of Airplanes contains themes of human migration, globalization, and the history of aviation. The film is self-described as "a visual journey about how far we've come and how fast we got there". According to Seginus Aerospace, the film's theme is connection because it shows how people and objects may travel more easily and quickly using aviation; according to the narration; "Everywhere we go, we find pieces of everywhere else". Philip Cosand, a volunteer critic and former projectionist at the Pacific Science Center IMAX, said the film's main theme is perspective because its main point is to shift audiences from a negative view of aviation to a positive one, and to broaden audiences with a technical view. He said it has very few technical points, as does the IMAX documentary To Fly! (1976). Blake Snow of Paste summarizes the film's moral as commercial aviation having "enhanced human life, especially [their] adventurous spirit"; although the industry is imperfect, it deserves one's perspective and gratitude.

Visually stylistic choices drive the film forward. It has been categorized as a travelogue documentary by various critics. Terwilliger said some shots have metaphorical meanings; for example, a shot of a tree in Africa represents the continent as the film's heart. Paul Thompson, writing for TravelPulse, said "Perspective" is a reference to sitting in an aircraft's window seat; "There are so many awful, divisive things going on in our world right now, that flying seven miles over it all is quite a wonderful escape sometimes".

== Release ==
The first trailer for Living in the Age of Airplanes premiered on July 19, 2014, under the title Aviation: The Invisible Highway, at the 2014 Global Business Travel Association convention. Two months prior, test screenings were conducted to generally positive responses. On December 12, the title change and release date were announced. National Geographic Films acquired distribution rights on December 15; president of distribution Mark Katz said it is on par with their "mission to inspire, illuminate and teach". The film's YouTube channel released two of its trailers on December 16, 2014, and April 3, 2015; the second trailer is shorter and has excerpts of Ford's narration, while the first is a slight re-edit of the Invisible Highway trailer, with texts and shots unused in the film, and the song "Outro" by M83. The poster was unveiled on March 7, 2015, with the tagline; "A mile of runway can take you anywhere".

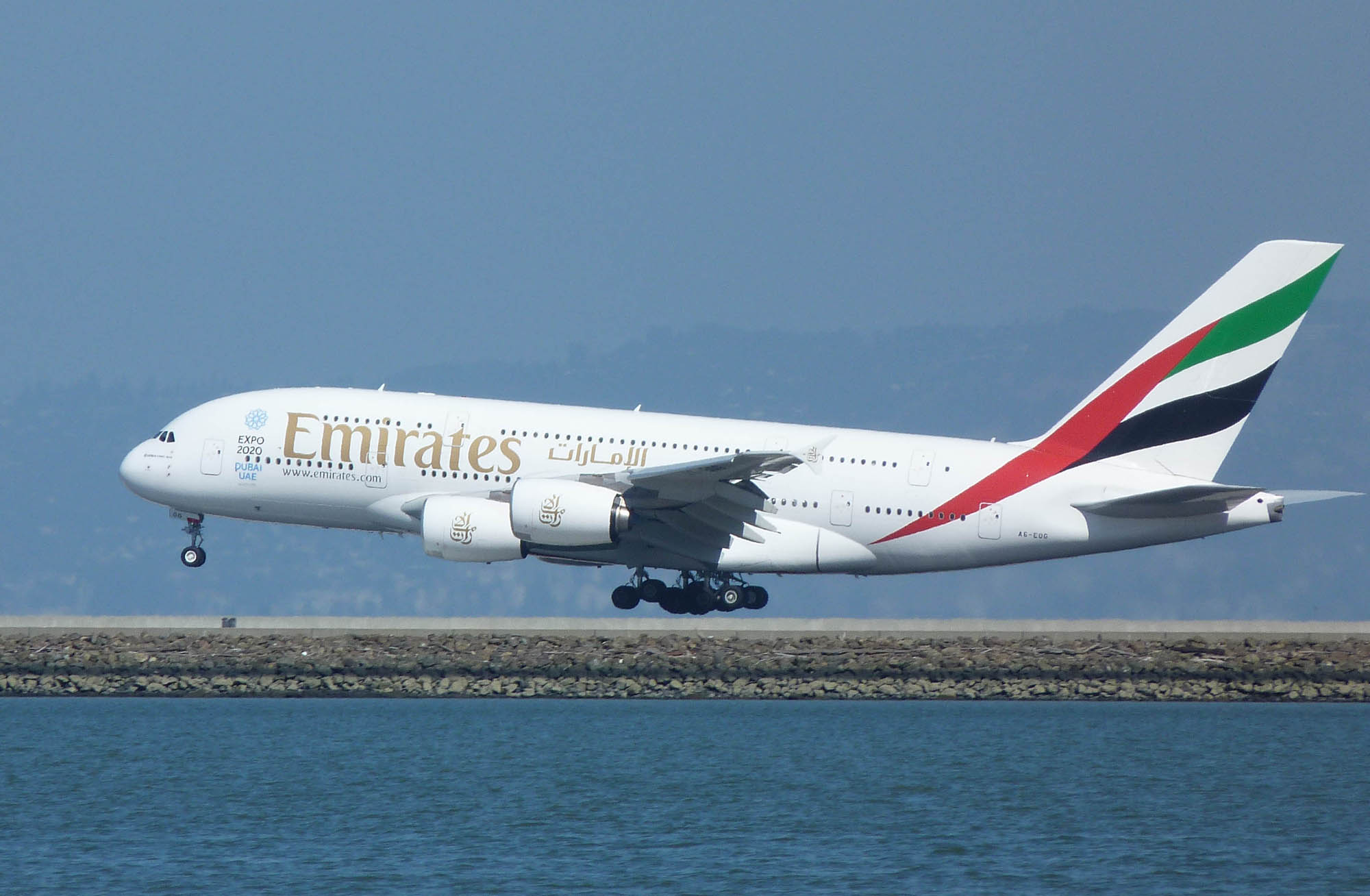
A6-EOG, the Emirates Airbus A380 used for the premiere of Living in the Age of Airplanes

Living in the Age of Airplanes premiered on April 6, 2015, on an exclusive Emirates Airbus A380 flight, which took off from Los Angeles International Airport, flew over Hollywood, circled over the Pacific Ocean, and landed at the same airport. Following a press conference at the Emirates Lounge, attendees (comprising aviation enthusiasts, museum staff, and the press) were able to watch it on the aircraft's entertainment screens as well as interview Terwilliger and Horner; Ford was unable to attend after being injured in a plane crash, which National Geographic reported created more interest in the film. Terwilliger clarified that Emirates did not sponsor the film. Harriet Baskas of USA Today praised the premiere as "fun and appropriate", and Mikey Glazer of TheWrap called it the "coolest movie premiere ever". Living in the Age of Airplanes then premiered theatrically at the Lockheed Martin IMAX Theater at the National Air and Space Museum on April 8. Terwilliger chose the venue in remembrance of watching To Fly! there. The film was screened three times a day until 2016. Premiere attendees included staff from the Congress, NASA, and other federal agencies.

It was later released on April 10 in IMAX, Omnimax, digital, and museum theaters throughout the US and Canada, beginning with 15 venues. Whether or not an IMAX documentary film gets screened is up to individual theaters; thus, the film's team rely on the general public to contact their nearest theater in order to expand screening scope. In Montreal's Canadian Museum of History, the film was translated to French, retitled Vivre À L'ère des Avions. It was supported by Aéroports de Montréal, and a used French dub track by Guy Nadon. The Robert Zemeckis Center for Digital Arts' screened the film free-of-charge for students of USC School of Cinematic Arts. It was also screened for attendees of the EAA AirVenture Oshkosh. The film also played in Franz Josef, Vilnius, and Valletta. Screening continues long after; on December 2, 2017, the TCL Chinese Theater screened the film and hosted a question-and-answer session with Terwilliger.

On September 14, 2016, National Geographic released Living in the Age of Airplanes on DVD and Blu-ray formats. The releases include a small booklet with a scene guide, which includes an online password to three of the film's Easter eggs as well as a preview of One Six Right. Special features include three aviation B-rolls, a deleted scene set in Hawaii, five behind-the-scenes videos, a video of the Emirates premiere, and the second trailer. Possibly due to product placement, there are nine videos by Airbus, GE Aviation, and FedEx that tour their works. Terwilliger Productions also released the film on their website, including access to the special features. The film was also released for streaming on iTunes and YouTube Movies; Juice Distribution distributed it on the latter, and the special features were also accessible via iTunes.

== Reception ==
=== Box office ===
In Australia, Living in the Age of Airplanes earned US$7,787 at the IMAX at Melbourne Museum (first released February 3, 2017), and in the United Kingdom, it earned US$224 at the BFI IMAX (first released October 15, 2015); thus earning a total of US$8,011 according to The Numbers. These were as of March 6, 2017, and 23 October 2015, respectively. The film appeared on several charts, gaining 17th place at "All Time Worldwide Box Office for National Geographic Entertainment Movies". Meanwhile, as of October 30, 2016, 15,359 Blu-rays were sold in the United States, earning US$460,460 and reaching number 13 on the daily sales chart. Overall, DVD sales earned US$241,093 and Blu-ray sales earned US$1,476,672, for a total of US$1,717,765, according to The Numbers.

=== Critical response ===
Film critics were polarized on the contents of Living in the Age of Airplanes; many praised it as a celebratory and insightful look at aviation while others panned it as an publicity stunt of the industry, although Snow thought that is not a bad thing. On review aggregator Rotten Tomatoes, the film received a 63% score with an average rating of 7.10/10, based on eight critic reviews. The film drew praise from voice actor Roger Craig Smith, journalists Jon Ostrower and Amelia Rose Earhart, personality Jason Silva, and Jason Rabinowitz, host of Flightradar24's podcast AvTalk. The film was also endorsed by prominent figures in the aviation industry, and was used in a 2018 event in collaboration with several United States airlines in response to the decline in the number of pilots.

Several critics thought it succeeds in showing the difficulty of life pre-aviation and the subtle impacts of aviation, making it an overall emotional experience; Paula Fleri-Soler of the Times of Malta called it "An ode to planes". Its ending was praised as a tearjerker. Tiffany Lafleur of The Concordian noted the flawless transition between topics with no fillers and recommended it for documentary fans. The quality of Ford's narration received polarizing opinions; some reviewers called it stiff and overblown, though it was also labeled awe-inspiring and personal. Michael D. Reid of the Times Colonist credited much of the film's success to Ford, calling the line "The airplane is the closest thing we've ever had to a time machine" the most powerful of the film. Aviation publications said Living in the Age of Airplanes will most like appeal to a wide audience rather than a niche aviation community, though Fleri-Soler opined otherwise. Some critics stressed the importance of viewing the film without judgment on aviation, "for only with a blank canvas can one truly appreciate the significance of this film".

Other critics were dismayed by the film's lack or omission of historical content and the disadvantages of aviation such as being a major contributor to climate change. "The World Comes to Us" shies away from topics of capitalism and underpaid labor when depicting shipping. The uncertainty over the future of aviation is also not covered, though John Hartl of The Seattle Times called the film "modest" and a "nearly seamless, [...] sunny depiction of what to expect and [has] been accomplished". Frank Scheck of The Hollywood Reporter argued that it "doesn't shy away from pointing out the many inconveniences suffered along the way". Cosand said criticisms of the film not being technical enough are invalid; he recommends the IMAX documentary Legends of Flight (2010) for those who seek technical information. Sandie Angulo Chen of Common Sense Media criticized Ford's narration for "accusing" travelers of not enjoying flights without mentioning the root of the problem. Jonathan Turner of The Dispatch-Argus said the film's purpose is not to educate about aviation but is rather a "love letter to flight". Some critics lamented the film's short running time.

The cinematography received more praise. Luke Hickman of High-Def Digest said the film blurs the line between digital and film, with some shots appearing illusionary. Chen recommended it as an add-on to a museum admission, especially for aviation enthusiasts, citing its rich visuals and educational value. They were compared to Rocky Mountain Express (2011), Planet Earth (2006), and the book The World is Flat (1976). The visuals were said to represent a love of aviation, thus enhancing Ford's narration. Some said the visuals alone makes the film worth paying for. Horner's score received universal acclaim for its ambiance and rich tone; Hickman said it is better than most film scores. While it was said to be "a bit schmaltzy", it has a spirited tone. The score was considered a good representation of Horner's style but its relative brevity compared to his other works was noted. Ronnie Scheib of Variety and Daniel Eagan of Film Journal International, however, panned the score as excessive. The film's 7.1 surround sound design was praised for its clarity, nuance, and balance.

=== Terwilliger's response to criticism ===
Terwilliger responded to audiences who criticized Living in the Age of Airplanes for not being similar to One Six Right, stating the core audiences are not them and that he felt One Six Right portrays general aviation as it should, leaving no need for a follow-up. He stated the criticism was expected and that some One Six Right fans expressed awe at the difference between One Six Right and Living in the Age of Airplanes. In response to Horner's death in a plane crash shortly after the film's release, Terwilliger said:

The issues [in aviation] are in the news: they are talked about, they do get their screen time. [This film] is meant to take the things we don't think about and put them front-and-center. The advertisement ... is, 'It's a beautiful thing that we're living in the age of airplanes'. ... It's not a propaganda film. It's not a Wright brothers film ... we don't mention any of the milestones of aviation. It's [a] very big ... view of aviation.

[T]he tragedy is incalculable, and the loss, for sure. It doesn't affect ... the message in the film. [I]s it perfect? No. Is there some risk? Yes. ... Those facts haven't changed, and it's very unfortunate, but it doesn't impact my love or enthusiasm at all for it. Ever since I was a kid, I think it's a beautiful thing.

=== Accolades ===
List of accolades received by Living in the Age of Airplanes
Award	Date of ceremony	Category	Recipient	Result	Ref.
Giant Screen Cinema Association Achievement Awards	September 10, 2015	Best Original Score	James Horner	Won	
Giant Screen Cinema Association Achievement Awards	September 10, 2015	Big Idea	National Geographic Studios (Note: Awarded "for its outreach to the aviation community to promote the film".)	Won	
North American Film Awards	2016	Best Score	James Horner	Won	

== See also ==
- Winged Migration (2001), a documentary also shot on all seven continents
