= The 33 (soundtrack) =

2015 film soundtrack album

The 33 (Original Motion Picture Soundtrack)

Film score by James Horner
- Released: November 6, 2015
- Recorded: 2014–2015
- Studios: Newman Scoring Stage, 20th Century Fox Studios, Los Angeles
- Genre: Film score
- Length: 63:10
- Label: WaterTower Music
- Producers: James Horner; Simon Franglen; Simon Rhodes

James Horner chronology
Southpaw (2015)	The 33 (2015)	Living in the Age of Airplanes (2016)

The 33 (Original Motion Picture Soundtrack) is the film score composed by James Horner to the 2015 biographical disaster survival drama film The 33 directed by Patricia Riggen which was based on the 2010 Copiapó mining disaster. It was one of Horner's few scores released after his death in June 2015. The film score was released posthumously on November 6, 2015, under the WaterTower Music label.

== Background ==
Patricia Riggen, the film's director, stated that James Horner signed the film as was picky on choosing the films and was profoundly moved by the script. Horner began recording the film score for The 33 in October 2014 at the Newman Scoring Stage in 20th Century Fox Studios in Los Angeles. Riggen stated that Horner was knowledgeable about Andean music and instruments, which she felt important for the film, as it reflected the culture of the story and each emotional beat—fear, hope, desperation and triumph—adding that his score captured the heart and soul of the story. It was one of Horner's posthumous releases, after he was killed in a plane crash on June 22, 2015. The score was released on November 6, 2015, through WaterTower Music.

== Reception ==
James Southall of Movie Wave wrote "The 33 isn't the kind of grand, dramatic work like most of the ones which will forever dominate people's lists of favourites but it's a really beautiful piece of music, full of passion and feeling, similarities with the composer's other South American-flavoured works only really superficial. Inevitably it's a somewhat bittersweet experience – but an enriching one." Thomas Glorieux of Maintitles wrote "If The 33 can and will be remembered in his vast list of scores, it will be because of its heart and its highlights. The kind of highlights James Horner seemed to write [so] easily [...] It's not the best James have ever written, but you can't deny it holds riches you'll not hear from anyone else this year, and all the years to come."

Filmtracks wrote "Perhaps more importantly, Horner concluded his career writing the music that brought him the most satisfaction in his waning years: heartfelt and respectful character drama. To that end, he succeeded." Pete Simons of Synchrotones wrote "James Horner's "The 33" is a genuinely beautiful work. Of course it's incredibly saddening to think we'll never hear this man's voice again, which means this album comes laden with 'nostalgia'. However, "The 33" can stand firmly on its own 2 (or 66) feet." Scott Tobias of Variety wrote "The musical theme, by the late James Horner, is nothing if not persistent." Blake Goble of Consequence called it "a rousing, posthumous score from James Horner that rescues this film from treacle and trite."

Sheri Linden of The Hollywood Reporter wrote "The late James Horner's score helps to push the emotional buttons while leaning way too heavily on Andean folk instrumentation." Abby Olcese of Sojourners called it a "stirring score" curated with extra poignancy. A. O. Scott of The New York Times called it a "heart-squeezing, throat-constricting score". Tasha Robinson of TheWrap described it a "miserablist score". However, Brian Formo of Collider felt "With all due respect to composer James Horner, who had a great career—full of many fantastic, classic scores—who passed away in a plane crash this year, and to whom the film is dedicated to, the music is almost always working against what we're seeing in The 33. For example, during the hellish collapse of the mountain—in which the men are struggling to outrun the tons of rubble that unleashes overpowering dust clouds and drop the men into darkness—Horner's score leaps and jumps like a Hobbit adventure fantasy. The sounds of the earthy carnage would've been more than enough, instead Horner's score tries to thrill when we should be feeling hopelessness and horror."

== Track listing ==
No.	Title	Artist	Length
1.	"The Atacama Desert"		1:59
2.	"Empanadas for Darío"		1:45
3.	"To the Heart of The Mountain"		2:29
4.	"The Collapse"		4:13
5.	"Buried Alive"		3:45
6.	"Drilling, The Sweetest Sound!"		1:06
7.	"Prayer – Camp Hope"		2:35
8.	"The Drill Misses (And Dreams Fade...)"		5:39
9.	"Gracias A La Vida"	Cote de Pablo	4:50
10.	"Aiming To Miss"		3:38
11.	"We Are All Well in the Refuge, The 33"		3:46
12.	"Always Brothers"		2:21
13.	"Fénix"		2:31
14.	"First Ascent"		4:58
15.	"Celebrations"		3:55
16.	"Family Is All We Have"		2:59
17.	"Al Final De Este Viaje En La Vida"	Los Bunkers	3:22
18.	"The 33"		3:43
19.	"Hope is Love"		3:36
Total length:			63:10

== Personnel ==
Credits adapted from liner notes:

- Music composer – James Horner
- Producer – James Horner, Simon Franglen, Simon Rhodes
- Arrangements – Simon Franglen, Simon Rhodes
- Engineer – Hannah Parrott, Vincent Cirilli
- Recording, mixing and mastering – Simon Rhodes
- Music editor – Joe E. Rand, Nevin Seus
- Executive producer – Jason Linn
- Graphic design – Sandeep Sriram
- Management – Lisa Margolis, Ray Gonzalez

Orchestra

- Orchestra – Hollywood Studio Symphony
- Orchestrated By – James Horner, J. A. C. Redford
- Conductor – James Horner
- Contractor – Gina Zimmitti, Sandy de Crescent

Performers

- Bass – Drew Dembowski, Edward Meares, Geoff Osika, Mike Valerio, Nico Abondolo, Oscar Hidalgo
- Cello – Armen Ksajikian, Cecilia Tsan, David Speltz, Dennis Karmazyn, Lauren Chipman, Steve Erdody, Tim Landauer, Trevor Handy
- Guitar – George Doering
- Viola – Lauren Chipman
- Viola – Alma Fernandez, Andrew Duckles, Brian Dembow, Carolyn Riley, David Walther, Pamela Goldsmith, Shawn Mann, Thomas Diener, Vicki Miskolczy
- Violin – Aimee Kreston, Amy Hershberger, Andrew Bulbrook, Clayton Haslop, Darius Campo, Elizabeth Johnson, Eun-Mee Ahn, Grace Oh, Helen Nightengale, Jackie Brand, Joel Pargman, Katia Popov, Kevin Connolly, Kevin Kumar, Lisa Liu, Maia Jasper, Marc Sazer, Natalie Leggett, Neel Hammond, Paul Henning, Phillip Levy, Rafael Rishik, Sarah Thornblade, Songa Lee, Tammy Hawtan
- Vocals – Tony Hinnigan
