= Living in the Age of Airplanes (soundtrack) =

Living in the Age of Airplanes (Original Motion Picture Soundtrack)

Film score by James Horner
- Released: September 14, 2016 (digital); August 23, 2017 (CD)
- Recorded: 2014
- Studios: Slovak Radio Concert Hall; AIR Lyndhurst Hall
- Genres: Acoustic; Celtic; classical; electronic; lounge; world
- Length: 49:56
- Labels: Terwilliger Productions; Intrada
- Producer: Simon Franglen

James Horner chronology
Southpaw (Music from and Inspired by the Motion Picture) (2015)	Living in the Age of Airplanes (Original Motion Picture Soundtrack) (2016)

Living in the Age of Airplanes (Original Motion Picture Soundtrack) is the soundtrack album to the 2015 American experimental documentary film Living in the Age of Airplanes, written and directed by Brian J. Terwilliger, which showcases the benefits of aviation in everyday lives and urges people to view aviation in a more positive light. The score was composed by James Horner. It was the last film Horner scored, before his death in a plane crash in June 2015. The score released through digital download on September 14, 2016, and the CD release was by Intrada Records in August 2017. Horner's score received generally positive reviews from critics and had garnered him awards posthumously.

== Production ==
Terwilliger wanted an A-list narrator and score composer for the film. James Horner befriended Terwilliger in 2008 while meeting at an air show; he agreed to compose the score. His goal was to give the score a spiritual feeling to match the film's tone, thus employing the world music genre. The score mostly consists of major-key harmonies, with "History of Transportation" and "Exponential Progress" being the only minor ones. "Nearly Perfected" features an orchestra. It is observed while the score has its Horner charm, there is an unexpected, soft theme in certain tracks that is reminiscent to the works of Thomas Newman. Horner thought the score marries together aviation and music. The score was performed by the Slovak National Symphony Orchestra at the Slovak Radio Concert Hall and some parts were recorded at the AIR Lyndhurst Hall. Vocals were sung by the Graham Foote Ensemble.

== Release ==
The film's score was released as a soundtrack album, on September 14, 2016, the same day, coinciding with the streaming and home video release. It was distributed to Apple Music, where it was remastered by Peter Doell. That same day, it was released on Amazon in MP3 format. Four days prior, Terwilliger announced he was discussing a physical release of between 3,000 and 5,000 copies with several record labels, and finally chose Intrada Records to distribute the soundtrack album. It was released on CD under the catalog number ISC401 on August 23, 2017, via Amazon.com as well as their official website. The CD contains liner notes from Terwilliger.

== Critical reception ==
Album ratings
Review scores
Source	Rating
Celluloid Tunes	4.5 stars
Movie Wave	4/5 stars

Horner's score received universal acclaim for its ambiance and rich tone; Hickman Luke of High-Def Digest said it is better than most film scores. James Southall of Movie Wave noted that while it was said to be "a bit schmaltzy", it is spirited and makes a "lovely" album. Reviewing the score, Pacific Science Center based Philip Cosand said "Home" is excessively dramatic but that it is appropriate in the context of an emotional scene. The score was considered a good representation of Horner's style but its relative brevity compared to his other works was noted. Nils Jacob Holt Hanssen of Celluloid Tunes called "History of Transportation" the best track, with "The Golden Age is Now" being the runner-up, and "Flowers" being the most atypical and humorous. The film's sound design was praised for its clarity, nuance, and balance. HuffPost said Horner "likened his approach ... to that of a painter, with the film serving as the canvas and musical color being used to describe and support the story's emotional dynamics". Ronnie Scheib of Variety and Daniel Eagan of Film Journal International, however, panned the score as excessive.

== Accolades ==
Award	Date of ceremony	Category	Recipient	Result	Ref.
Giant Screen Cinema Association Achievement Awards	September 10, 2015	Best Original Score	James Horner	Won	
North American Film Awards	November 3, 2016	Best Score	James Horner	Won	

== Track listing ==
Living in the Age of Airplanes (Original Motion Picture Soundtrack)
No.	Title	Length
1.	"Opening Sequence"	2:01
2.	"The World Before the Airplane"	2:23
3.	"200,000-Year Timeline"	2:31
4.	"History of Transportation"	2:51
5.	"Nearly Perfected"	3:11
6.	"Portal to the Planet"	1:20
7.	"Migration Vacation"	2:59
8.	"Ancient Civilizations"	2:48
9.	"Maldives"	2:54
10.	"Antarctica"	3:24
11.	"Flowers"	3:01
12.	"Exponential Progress"	4:20
13.	"Perspective"	2:58
14.	"The Golden Age is Now"	3:09
15.	"Home"	2:02
16.	"End Credits"	1:25
17.	"The Golden Age is Now (Remix)"	3:05
18.	"End Credits (Remix)"	3:26
Total length:		49:56

== Personnel ==
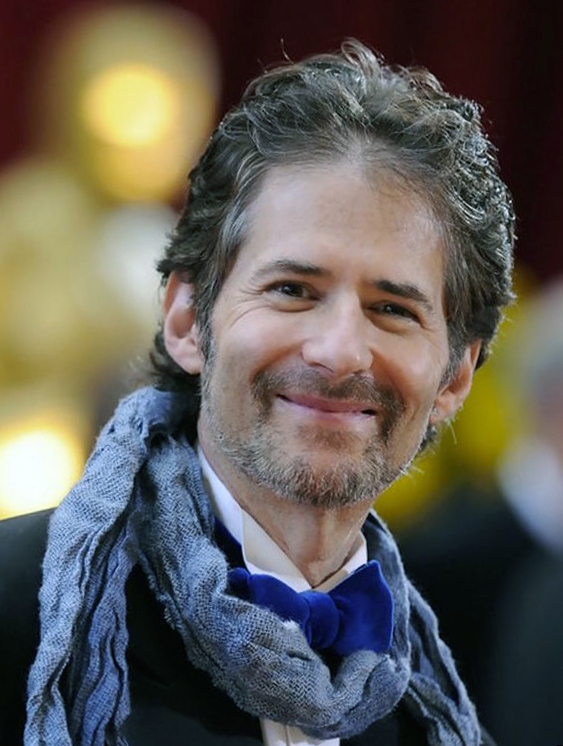
James Horner composed the film's score.

Credits adapted from Living in the Age of Airplanes's end credits.

- James Horner – composer
- Simon Franglen – producer and arranger
- Simon Rhodes – arranger, orchestrator, mixer, and engineer
- Steve Sidwell – orchestrator
- Peter Boyer – orchestrator
- Jim Henrikson – editor
- Dick Bernstein – editor
- Peter Doell – mastering

=== Slovak National Symphony Orchestra ===
- Peter Fuchs – engineer
- Allan Wilson – conductor
- Paul Talkington – contractor
- Marian Turner – manager
- Natalia Villanueva Garcia – copyist
