= Hal Fishman =

American journalist

Harold Fishman
- Born: August 25, 1931; Brooklyn, New York, U.S.
- Died: August 7, 2007 (aged 75); Los Angeles, California, U.S.
- Occupation: TV news anchor
- Years active: 1960–2007
- Employer: Tribune Broadcasting/KTLA
- Notable credit(s): KTLA News (10:00 p.m.) anchor (1975–2007)
- Spouse: Nolie Fishman
- Children: David Fishman

Harold Fishman (August 25, 1931 – August 7, 2007) was a local news anchor in the Los Angeles area, serving on-air with Los Angeles-area television stations continuously from 1960 until his death in 2007. Fishman was the longest-running news anchor in the history of American television before Dave Ward surpassed him in 2015. He was also a record-holding aviator. "The Simpsons" cartoon television anchorman Kent Brockman was partially inspired by Hal Fishman.

== Early life and education ==
A Brooklyn, New York, native, Fishman received a bachelor's degree from Cornell University where he worked at the campus radio station. He also received a master's degree in political science from UCLA in 1956. Planning for a career in academia, he served as an assistant professor of political science at California State University, Los Angeles for two years.

== Career ==
Eventually, Los Angeles independent television station KCOP approached Fishman to teach an on-air course, and later, the station invited him to anchor his own segment. Fishman had been on the air continuously since June 20, 1960, moving from KCOP to KTLA in May of 1965. That year, he received significant exposure as a field reporter for KTLA when he helped cover the Watts Riots live from the Los Angeles Police Department command center. Fishman also worked at KTTV (1970-71) and KHJ-TV (now KCAL-TV, 1973-75), returning to KTLA on January 8, 1975, to anchor their evening news broadcast NewsWatch, later renamed News at Ten.

=== Notable events covered ===
As a news anchor, Fishman covered numerous events in Los Angeles and the world, ranging from the assassination of presidential candidate Robert F. Kennedy, to the Sylmar and Northridge earthquakes, to Pope John Paul II's 1987 visit to southern California. He, along with KTLA, was credited for being the first to air footage of the police beating of Rodney King in 1991, an event that sparked riots a year later when the officers were acquitted. In 2000, KTLA dedicated its newsroom in Fishman's honor, commemorating his 40 years in television and his years of service and commitment to the region.

=== Honors ===
Fishman won myriad awards, including the Associated Press Television-Radio Association's first-ever Lifetime Achievement Award. He received a "star" on the Hollywood "Walk of Fame," at 1560 Vine Street and KTLA named its television news studio after Fishman. He also authored two novels, Flight 902 Is Down (co-authored with aviation writer Barry J. Schiff) and The Vatican Target. Fishman was also an accomplished pilot and set 13 records for speed and altitude. In 1969, he was awarded the Louis Blériot medal by the Fédération Aéronautique Internationale.

== Death ==
Hal Fishman's last broadcast was on July 30, 2007, eight days before his death. On July 31, 2007, the night before Fishman became ill and after his last broadcast, KTLA celebrated his 47 years in television with a special gala at the Autry National Museum in Los Angeles. The event was emceed by Morning Show anchor Michaela Pereira and attended by such dignitaries as Los Angeles mayor Antonio Villaraigosa and Los Angeles County sheriff Lee Baca. During the gala, Fishman spoke to the audience about his time in television. He appeared somewhat fatigued but little would be known about his condition until the day after.

Fishman died August 7, 2007, at home, 18 days before he would have turned 76, following recent treatment for a liver infection, which had detected cancer in his liver and colon. That morning, the station interrupted its regular news schedule and dedicated much of the Morning Show and Prime News broadcasts to Fishman. The reporters on Prime News did not break for commercials that evening. His body was soon cremated.

== Filmography ==
Fishman played a television news anchor or reporter in numerous films during his career:

- Black Sunday (1977) - Reporter
- When Hell was in Session (1979) - 1st Newscaster
- Maximum Overdrive (1986) - Anchorman Voice (voice, uncredited)
- Wisdom (1987) - Network Anchorman
- Forrest Gump (1994)
- Jimmy Hollywood (1994) - Anchorperson
- Joe Dirt (2001) - Himself
- Crocodile Dundee in Los Angeles (2001) - Himself
- National Security (2003) - Himself
- Malibu's Most Wanted (2003) - Himself
- One Six Right (2005) - Himself
- Spider-Man 3 (2007) - Himself (final film role)
