= Bryan H. Carroll =

American film director

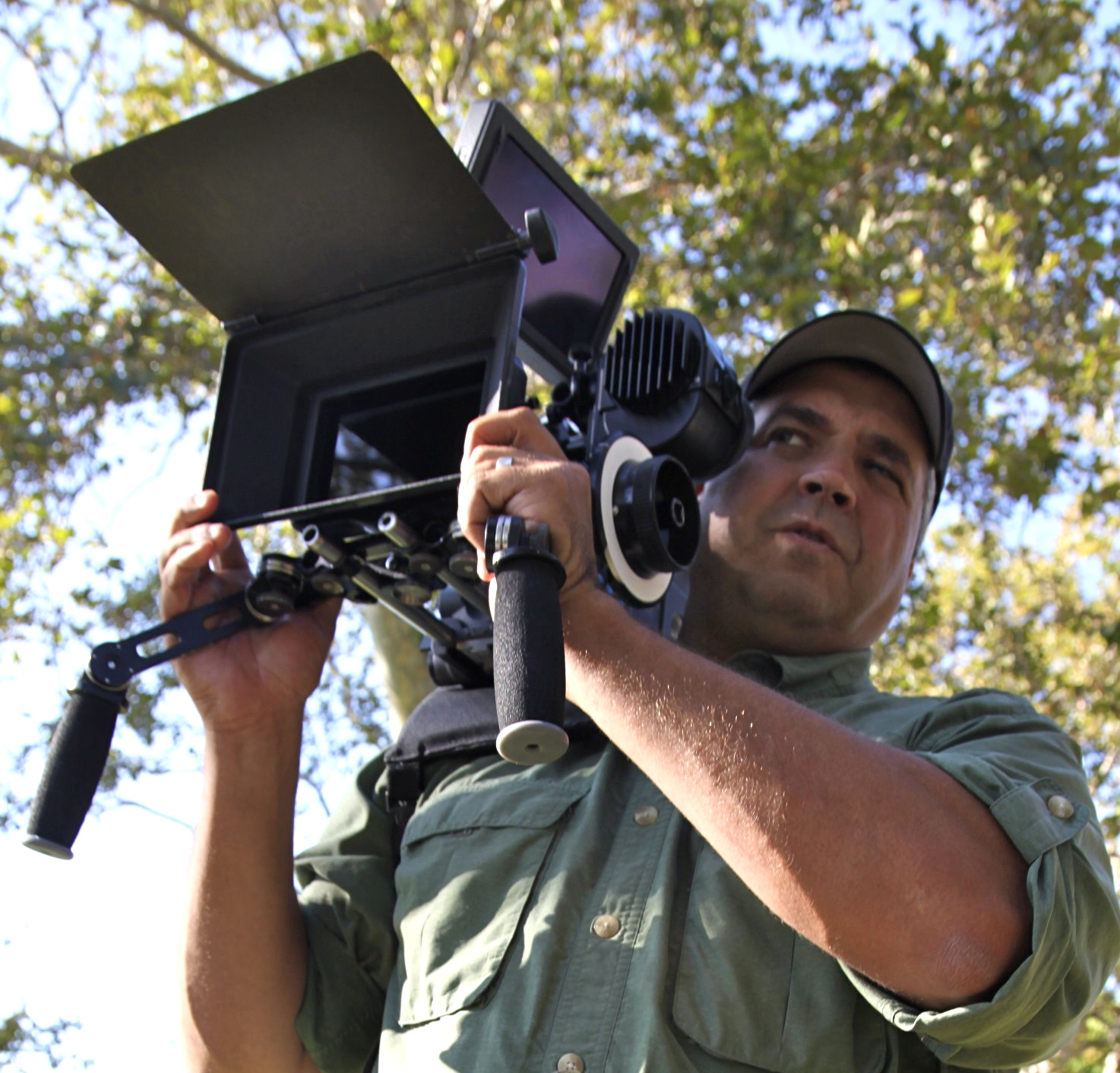
- Born: Bryan H. Carroll; 13 February 1967 (age 59); Bountiful, Utah
- Other name: Bryan Carroll
- Years active: 29
- Awards: New Media Film Festival award for Best Documentary; 2014 Why We Ride; Los Angeles New Media Film Festival award for Best Documentary 2014 Why We Ride

Bryan H. Carroll (born February 13, 1967) is an American director, producer, screenwriter and editor. He is best known for his award winning documentary Why We Ride, his distinctions from the American Motorcyclist Association and contributions to Titanic, Public Enemies, Die Hard, Predator, Collateral, Miami Vice, Ali, Skid Row and The Phantom.

== Early life ==
Bryan Carroll was born on February 13, 1967, in Bountiful, Utah, where he attended the University of California, Los Angeles Writers Program. His career began early in 1986, when at 19, he began working at CRC, a visual effects company in Hollywood that serviced studios and major production companies. In this company, he interacted extensively with editors and eventually worked his way into the cutting room.

== Career ==
Carroll has worked in the roles of director, producer, writer and editor. He has collaborated with directors and producers like James Cameron, Michael Mann, Jerry Bruckheimer, Joel Silver. Carroll also created the Editexpress - the first mobile film editing trailer for location use on feature films.

=== Director or second unit director ===
He has directed or second unit directed several movies, including Why We Ride, Public Enemies, Miami Vice, To Ride A Legend, Collateral and Robbery Homicide Division (Season 1).

=== Producer ===
He has been a producer, associate producer, co-producer, post production producer, executive producer or executive soundtrack producer of a number of movies including Why We Ride, Public Enemies, Living in the Age of Airplanes, To Ride A Legend, Skid Row, Miami Vice, Redline, Collateral and the TV show Robbery Homicide Division.

=== Screenwriter ===
His writing debut was the documentary film on the life of motorcyclists titled Why We Ride. This film has received recognition from critics, viewers and has won several awards.

=== Editor ===
He worked as an editor on movies and shows including Titanic, Major League III, The Phantom (1996 film), Free Willy, Accident (1993 TV-series), Tales From The Crypt and Last Chance.

== Filmography ==
Year	Title	Credited as
1987	Predator	Assistant editor
1988	Die Hard	Assistant editor
1989	Road House	Assistant editor
1991	City Slickers	First assistant editor
1993	The Accident (TV series)	Editor
1993	Free Willy	Assistant editor
1996	The Phantom	Editor
1997	Titanic	Visual effects editor
1998	Major League: Back to the Minors	Editor
2001	Ali	Associate editor
2003	Robbery Homicide Division (TV series)	Co-producer (13 episodes), second unit director
2004	Collateral	Associate producer, second unit director
2006	Miami Vice	Co-producer, second unit director
2007	Redline	Associate producer
2007	Skid Row	Executive producer
2009	Public Enemies	Co-producer, executive soundtrack producer, second unit director
2013	Why We Ride	Director, producer, writer
2015	Living in the Age of Airplanes	Producer

== Awards and recognition ==
Carroll has been credited in inventing a lot of the workflow for digital photography in motion picture production along with Michael Mann. He has received the following awards and distinctions during his career:

- Best Documentary 2014 - New Media Film Festival
- Best Documentary 2014, Best Editing 2014, Best Cinematography 2014 - AutoMoto Film Festival
- Family Choice 2014 - Family Choice Awards
- Best Documentary 2014 - Los Angeles New Media Film Festival
- Best Documentary 2013 - Motorcycle Film Festival
- Hazel Kolb Brighter Image Award 2014, Motorcyclist of the Year 2014 - American Motorcyclist Association
- 2014 AMA Motorcyclist of the year award from the American Motorcyclist Association
- Best Documentary 2014 - Portland Motorcycle Film Festival
