= Wolf Totem (soundtrack) =

2015 film soundtrack album

Wolf Totem (Original Motion Picture Soundtrack)

Film score by James Horner
- Released: 23 February 2015
- Recorded: 2014–2015
- Studio: AIR Studios, London
- Genre: Film score
- Length: 58:57
- Label: Milan
- Producer: James Horner; Simon Franglen; Simon Rhodes

James Horner chronology
One Day in Auschwitz (2015)	Wolf Totem (2015)	Southpaw (2015)

Wolf Totem (Original Motion Picture Soundtrack) is the film score composed by James Horner to the 2015 film Wolf Totem directed by Jean-Jacques Annaud based on the 2004 Chinese novel. The score was released through Milan Records on 23 February 2015 and won the International Film Music Critics Association Award for Best Original Score for a Drama Film.

== Background ==
In September 2014, it was announced that James Horner would compose the film's music for Wolf Totem previously working with Annaud on The Name of the Rose (1986), Enemy at the Gates (2004) and Black Gold (2011). Horner watched the film and a few days later, wrote the main theme which he played it on piano. The score was recorded for three weeks at the AIR Studios in London. During the recording session, Horner called Annaud added that the studio members were absent for hearing the recording, to which Annaud replied that there were no people, and asked him to play the music straight from his heart. Having liked Mongolian music, Horner's music producer Simon Franglen came to Annaud in Beijing, where he had recorded 15 days with numerous musicians from Mongolia.

== Reception ==
Jonathan Broxton of Movie Music UK wrote "For someone like me, who loves music like this, listening to Wolf Totem took me back to those days in the mid 1990s when I first started on my journey of film music discovery, and reminded me just how good film music can be when it's done by someone as talented, intelligent, and with as much emotional power as James Horner. It's only March, but this is one of the scores of the year." James Southall of Movie Wave wrote "Melodically inspired, emotionally rewarding, dramatically potent, it offers the very best a soundtrack album can offer – a clear musical journey, colourful and evocative, full of emotion; and then there's that brilliantly memorable theme. It's got passion, beauty, tragedy and Horner uses all his skill to massage them into a truly fulfilling whole."

Filmtracks wrote "For Horner, the year represented a sudden and final return to the spotlight with a plethora of mostly small-scale works debuting in short succession, his musical voice remaining a very welcome one through the end." Pete Simons of Synchrotones wrote "Wolf Totem is a grand, sometimes brutal, and always sweeping orchestral score with a truly majestic main theme – one that'll stay with you for days, if not longer." Sean Wilson of MFiles wrote "Wolf Totem is another masterful work from a composer whose death will be lamented for years to come, and a fitting summation of the emotion that coursed through a remarkable career."

Maggie Lee of Variety wrote "James Horner's score, which provides strong emotional sweep in the non-dialogue scenes, risks being overwrought elsewhere." Mark Jenkins of The Washington Post and Ben Kenigsberg of The New York Times called it a "bombastic" and "swirling". Scott Tobias of Phoenix New Times described it a "Easternized score". John Semley of The Globe and Mail called the score "insistent".

== Track listing ==
No.	Title	Length
1.	"Leaving for the Country"	2:17
2.	"Wolves Stalking Gazelles"	4:19
3.	"An Offering to Tengger / Chen saves the last Wolf Pup"	9:22
4.	"Wolves attack the Horses"	4:49
5.	"A Red Ribbon"	3:20
6.	"The Frozen Lake"	4:42
7.	"Discovering Hidden Dangers"	2:46
8.	"Little Wolf"	3:27
9.	"Scaling the Walls"	4:07
10.	"Suicide Pact"	2:17
11.	"Hunting the Wolves"	6:04
12.	"Death of A'ba"	1:35
13.	"Return to the Wild"	9:52
Total length:		58:57

== Accolades ==
Award	Category	Recipient(s)	Result	Ref.
International Film Music Critics Association	Best Original Score for a Drama Film	James Horner	Won	
International Film Music Critics Association	Film Score of the Year	James Horner	Nominated	
International Film Music Critics Association	Film Music Composition of the Year	James Horner – ("Return to the Wild")	Nominated	
