= One Six Right =

2005 film by Brian J. Terwilliger

One Six Right: The Romance of Flying
- Theatrical release poster
- Directed by: Brian J. Terwilliger
- Story by: Brian J. Terwilliger
- Produced by: Brian J. Terwilliger
- Starring: Sydney Pollack; Lorenzo Lamas; Tony Bill; Paul Moyer; Hal Fishman; Clay Lacy; Bob Hoover; Desiree Horton
- Music by: Nathan Wang
- Distributed by: Terwilliger Productions
- Release date: November 25, 2005
- Running time: 73 minutes
- Country: United States
- Language: English

One Six Right: The Romance of Flying is an independent documentary film about the general aviation industry as seen through a local airport. The film has garnered both local and national political attention in the United States as an accurate depiction of general aviation and its important contributions to all aviation industries worldwide. Within the entertainment industry, the film has attracted the sponsorship and support of many large media companies, including Apple, Sony Electronics, Toshiba, Technicolor, Bose, and Dolby, as pioneering new standards in high definition (HD) film making and distribution.

== Summary ==
"Asking someone why they love to fly is almost like asking someone why they like Picasso. The beauty is the fact that you can’t really describe it, it’s something that you have to behold. Flying takes you into another dimension, literally. We see, feel, and experience things that people who don’t fly will never know."

— Barry Schiff, in the opening interview of the film

The film centers on Van Nuys Airport, also covering the general aviation industry as a whole. It first interviews pilots who have been there, exploring how they first got interested in aviation and their experience of flying, specifically in the airport. According to them, the feeling of flying is heavenly, free from societal disturbances and allowing for a more diverse appreciation of nature. They describe close connection to Van Nuys Airport as home, with its most commonly used runway, 16R (pronounced "one six right") as a reminder of that. This is further amplified when they performed their first solo. Van Nuys Airport is the world's busiest general aviation airport, busier than London Heathrow itself.

The film then chronicles the history of the airport, which began as Los Angeles Metropolitan Airport in 1920, an ambitious project to make Van Nuys an aerotropolis. Three men named Heffron, McCray, and St. John got into a real estate development process. The layout of the two runways, which makes the airport weather-friendly, were the best in the United States. It was opened on October 1, 1928, but the formalized opening date is December 17 to commemorate "the 25th anniversary of the Wright brothers' first flight". It soon formed a large community of aviation industries and enthusiasts. Marketing efforts include holding several events to highlight the airport's advantages. Later, Amelia Earhart set a speed record flight there. However, the airport became unpopular during the Wall Street Crash of 1929, inflamed by the Great Depression. Meanwhile, it was used to distribute contraband. It began resurging when executive vice president of operations, Dean Daily Sr., allowed the film industry to shoot in the location; an example is Casablanca (1942). On December 7, 1941, the United States government acquired Metropolitan Airport, changing it to the Van Nuys Army Air Base, also lengthening the runways and changing its material to concrete. According to pilots, the subsequent period is the golden era of general aviation and airports. In 1957, it was renamed Van Nuys Airport. Runway 16R was lengthened by 2,000 feet (610 metres). Amid all this, Van Nuys became involved in various revolutions in the American aviation history.

The film then comments on general aviation airports facing backlashes from locals, with various petitions on banning certain aircraft, or closing the airports down. As a result, at the time of filming one general aviation airport in the United States was closing per week. On March 30, 2003, Chicago Mayor Richard M. Daley illegally bulldozered the runway of Meigs Field, in order to build a park named after his wife, despite civil negotiations to build the park while preserving the airport. The film's interviewees expressed disgust at the action and impunity. They then disagree that general aviation is causing noise pollution: "[Just] shut your mouth for a few minutes, and wait until [the airplanes] go by." They argue that general aviation is important to society, such as transporting cancer patients. However, they acknowledged that the industry is not perfect, highlighting many efforts to make airplanes more noise and environmentally friendly.

== Distribution ==
The One Six Right DVD made news by selling over 10,000 units independently in its first two weeks of release. By March 2006, Brian J. Terwilliger (Producer/Director) made the cover of The Hollywood Reporter in an article titled Filmmaker Takes Flight to DVD. Brian's determination to maintain all distribution rights was a noted departure from the common practice of selling rights to a third party distributor. During the first year of distribution, One Six Right's website became a leading example of successful independent film distribution by developing a viral marketing strategy that included multiple levels of consumer awareness allowing the film to develop significant presence within its niche audiences worldwide.

=== First to HD DVD ===
Filmed entirely in high definition, One Six Right was the first independently financed and produced film shot in high definition and distributed on DVD in both SD and HD formats. It was also the first documentary and the first aviation film released this way.

The HD DVD was a popular demonstration disc because of its HD special features and has since been replaced by the more popular and widely used Blu-ray Disc format. One Six Right was released on Blu-ray December 2015, to celebrate the 10th anniversary.

=== First exclusive 4K tour ===
In partnership with Sony Electronics, the One Six Right national tour covered twelve U.S. cities between July and December 2006 and showcased Sony's SXRD 4K large venue digital projectors. Completely self-funded by ticket and DVD sales at each venue, the tour received notable coverage within the entertainment industry as pioneering HD theatrical exhibition. The Hollywood Reporter covered the tour's success in the November 13, 2006, "Leadership in Hollywood" special edition in an article titled "Digital do-it-yourself".

The tour began at the annual Experimental Aircraft Association's (EAA) AirVenture Oshkosh airshow and convention. Sony Electronics and Bose installed a 44-foot (13 m) wide screen and a 5.1 channel digital surround system in the AirVenture Museum.

=== Tour finale ===
The tour ended on December 2, 2006, with a finale screening at the 64,000-square-foot (5,900 m^{2}) Syncro Aviation hangar at Van Nuys Airport. Sony created a custom SXRD 4K high definition 5.1 digital surround sound movie theater in the east half of hangar with 1,300 seats for the audience.

The west half of the hangar was transformed into an aviation museum, displaying 16 of the actual aircraft shown in the film. These included two P-51s, a DC-3, Piper Cub, Fleet biplane, Beech Staggerwing, two Pitts biplanes, an F-5 Freedom Fighter and T-38 Talon jet, a T-6 Texan, A-26 Invader, B-25, Cirrus VK-30 and Cessna 172.

Also on display were the actual high-definition cameras used to make the film and the helicopter and its gyroscopically stabilized Gyron camera system that shot the aerial sequences. Two hundred sixty movie lights provided dramatic museum-style lighting from above.

After the film played at the tour finale, producer/director Brian J. Terwilliger presented EAA president Tom Poberezny with a $15,395 donation to EAA's Young Eagles charity. The money was the result of a $5 per DVD donation from sales on the EAA website (during July 2006) and also during the previous EAA AirVenture Oshkosh airshow where the distributors of One Six Right collectively sold 3,079 DVDs.

=== Blu-ray anniversary edition ===
To commemorate the film's 10th anniversary, One Six Right was digitally remastered in 1080p HD from the original high definition footage. The Anniversary Edition Blu-ray includes all special features from the original DVD release, all content from "One Six Left" (the companion DVD), plus 10-minutes of new footage. It became available in 2015.

== Political activism ==
On September 22, 2006, One Six Right was exhibited to the United States Congress on Capitol Hill in Washington, D.C. This special screening was organized and sponsored by the Aircraft Owners and Pilots Association (AOPA), the General Aviation Manufacturers Association (GAMA), the National Air Transportation Association (NATA) and the National Business Aviation Association (NBAA).

In the Spring of 2005, AOPA sent a complimentary copy of One Six Right to every member of Congress who was a private pilot. Additionally, AOPA sent over 1,400 DVDs of One Six Right to all their airport support network volunteers in hopes of inspiring local community discussions on the importance of general aviation.

On November 15, 2005, AOPA President Phil Boyer awarded Brian J. Terwilliger with AOPA's Special Citation for Excellence for promoting General Aviation through the art of filmmaking.

== Licensing ==
In response to hundreds of grass-roots organized screenings, the distributors of One Six Right have created a public performance licensing process.

== Production ==
The Making of One Six Right featurette was released in 2006 on a companion DVD titled One Six Left - The Companion DVD. This twenty-four-minute-long special feature showcased the six-year journey that brought One Six Right from conception to theatrical premiere.

=== Milestones ===
- December 25, 2006, One Six Right had its world television premiere on Discovery HD Theater (now HD Theater), a sister network to The Discovery Channel.
- By its 12th month of distribution, over 45,000 One Six Right products had been sold to consumers worldwide.
- By December 2006, a full line of branded merchandise had been produced and made available. Products included a Flexfit hat, a 2007 14-month calendar, a CD soundtrack, a 1/20th scale Piper Cub replica, an HD DVD and One Six Left - The Companion DVD.
- By March 2007, One Six Right products were available internationally through pilot shops and entertainment stores in Australia, North America, Europe, Africa and Asia.
- On December 1, 2015, the "Anniversary Edition" Blu-ray was released for worldwide distribution.
