= Identity FX =

- Type: Privately held company
- Industry: Film and Television
- Founded: 2004
- Founder: Leo Vezzali and David Scott Van Woert
- Headquarters: Los Angeles, California, USA
- Services: Visual effects and stereoscopic 3D for feature films, trailers, and commercials
- Website: identityfx.com

Identity FX, a post-production division of Identity Studios, Inc., is a Visual Effects (VFX) company and stereoscopic 3D design studio located in Los Angeles. The company specializes in full-service visual effects and stereoscopic 3D conversion in post production.

Identity FX has created visuals for movies, TV shows, and commercial campaigns. It completed visual effects, stereoscopic conversion, and native stereoscopic optimization work for many titles, including The Amazing Spider-Man, Prometheus, Conan the Barbarian, Green Lantern, The Chronicles of Narnia: The Voyage of the Dawn Treader, Hancock, Transformers, U23D, Paramount Park's 4D Borg Adventure, and the RealD Demos.

== Company history ==
Having established Shockwave Pictures, a digital production studio based in San Francisco, Leo Vezzali and David Scott Van Woert teamed up in Los Angeles on 2004 to co-found Identity FX, as a Visual Effects and Post Production Studio.

In 2010, Identity FX transitioned from Visual Effects into a stereoscopic 3D studio, positioning itself as a 2D to 3D conversion provider.

Upon the popularity of stereoscopic 3D conversion in from 2005-2010, Identity FX had invested significantly in the expertise to develop and manage the 2D-to-3D conversion process.

== Notable Releases ==
Visual Effects and Stereo-3D

- The Amazing Spider-Man
- Prometheus
- Conan the Barbarian
- Green Lantern
- The Chronicles of Narnia: The Voyage of the Dawn Treader
- Transformers
- Hancock
- U23D
- Death Race franchise
- Hostel franchise

Commercials

- Nike - Quick Controls Chaos Project
- Coca-Cola
- McDonald's
- Google
- Bethesda Software

Titles and Graphics

- America's Next Top Models

Trailers

- 3net
- Real D
- Walden Media
- Fox
- Lions Gate
- Universal
- Warner Brothers
- MGM
- Fox Searchlight
- Paramount Classics
