= Brian J. Terwilliger =

American filmmaker

- Born: May 14, 1976 (age 49); Manchester, Connecticut, U.S.
- Occupation: filmmaker
- Years active: 1995–present

Brian J. Terwilliger (born May 14, 1976) is an American documentary film director and producer known for his two films, One Six Right and Living in the Age of Airplanes, both of which are produced under his independent company Terwilliger Productions, based in Los Angeles.

== Filmography ==
- Living in the Age of Airplanes (2015), producer and director
- One Six Right (2005)
- The Core (2003), visual effects producer
- Big Fish (2003), visual effects
- Sordid Lives (2000), 1st assistant director
