= Southpaw: Original Motion Picture Soundtrack =

2015 film soundtrack album

Film score by James Horner
- Released: July 24, 2015
- Recorded: 2015
- Genre: Film score
- Length: 47:39
- Label: Sony Classical
- Producers: James Horner; Simon Franglen; Simon Rhodes

James Horner chronology
| Wolf Totem (2015) | Southpaw (2015) | The 33 (2015) |

Southpaw: Original Motion Picture Soundtrack is the film score composed by James Horner to the 2015 film Southpaw directed by Antoine Fuqua starring Jake Gyllenhaal, Forest Whitaker and Rachel McAdams. The film was Horner's final film score he recorded before he was killed in a plane crash in June 2015. The album, which was dedicated to his memory, was posthumously released on July 24, 2015, through Sony Classical Records.

== Background ==
In an interaction with Daniel Schweiger of Film Music Magazine in September 2014, Harry Gregson-Williams stated that he would compose the music for Southpaw, thereby collaborating with Antoine Fuqua for the third time after The Replacement Killers (1998) and The Equalizer (2014). But due to reasons unknown, Gregson-Williams opted out of the project and was subsequently replaced by James Horner.

Horner, who watched the film, told Fuqua that he was deeply moved by the film's story and the emotional connection revolving around the father-daughter relationship. Though Fuqua was skeptic on Horner's involvement, due to budget constraints, Horner assured that he would do the film without receiving a remuneration as he entrusted Fuqua's creative direction. Eventually, he paid the musicians from his own money for recording. In an interaction through a fan site, Horner considered the film to be an uncharted territory, as it based on an American boxer and considered it to be an edgy and simplistic score, without huge orchestra.

Southpaw was one of Horner's final film score, as he died in a plane crash on June 22, 2015. The score would be later produced, recorded and mixed by Simon Franglen and Simon Rhodes. The album was released through Sony Classical Records on July 24, 2015, the same day as the film and is dedicated to the memory of Horner, which was shown in the album cover.

== Reception ==
Garrett Tiedemann of Your Classical wrote "There's an acute sadness in this score—knowing that it's the last we can expect. For someone around so long we grow to expect complacency. Horner was searching for new territories. Just imagine what he could have done with the right material and a little more time." James Southall of Movie Wave wrote [James Horner's music] go beneath the surface and there's a depth to the music despite its generally sparse nature; while the colour palette might be far removed from the Horner norm, it is still a vivid one."

Filmtracks wrote "On first pass, Southpaw may be an underwhelming, occasionally irritating listening experience, but further examination will reveal ten minutes of worthy melodic material that mostly survives its synthetic backing." Pete Simons of Synchrotones wrote "It's fascinating just how cold and unsettling this score feels compared to the vast majority of the composer's work" and called it "a fascinating score". Thomas Glorieux of Maintitles wrote "This is a modern score for Horner, and a fresh experience".

ReadJunk.com wrote "Horner's last score does the job but the music isn't necessarily memorable". Timothy Monger of AllMusic wrote "Southpaw's powerful and somber score inadvertently provides a fitting requiem to his own tragic end." Movie Music Mania-based critic wrote "To best appreciate Southpaw, the score must be evaluated on its own merits and, on those, it is an intriguing and mostly recommendable addition to the composer's filmography." The Hollywood Reporter-based critic wrote "James Horner's score that ranges from moody to rap". Justin Chang of Variety wrote "James Horner's synth score adds to the film's brooding tenor". Peter Martin of ScreenAnarchy wrote "James Horner contributes one of his last musical scores, enhancing the drama without calling attention to itself."

== Track listing ==
| No. | Title | Length |
|---|---|---|
| 1. | "The Preparations" | 2:36 |
| 2. | "A More Normal Life" | 1:42 |
| 3. | "A Fatal Tragedy" | 2:33 |
| 4. | "The Funeral, Alone…" | 0:51 |
| 5. | "Suicidal Rampage" | 8:28 |
| 6. | "Empty Showers" | 3:39 |
| 7. | "Dream Crusher" | 2:30 |
| 8. | "A Cry for Help" | 4:16 |
| 9. | "House Auction" | 2:39 |
| 10. | "A Long Road Back" | 2:26 |
| 11. | "Training" | 3:53 |
| 12. | "How Much They Miss Her" | 2:15 |
| 13. | "Hope vs Escobar" | 8:26 |
| 14. | "A Quiet Moment…" | 1:25 |
| Total length: | | 47:39 |

== Personnel ==
Credits adapted from liner notes:

- Music composer: James Horner
- Music producers: James Horner, Simon Franglen, Simon Rhodes
- Recording and mixing: Simon Rhodes
- Additional arrangements: Simon Franglen, Simon Rhodes
- Assistant engineer: Hannah Parrott
- Music editor: Joe E. Rand

== See also ==
- Southpaw: Music from and Inspired by the Motion Picture
