= Ali Velshi =

Canadian-American journalist (born c. 1968)

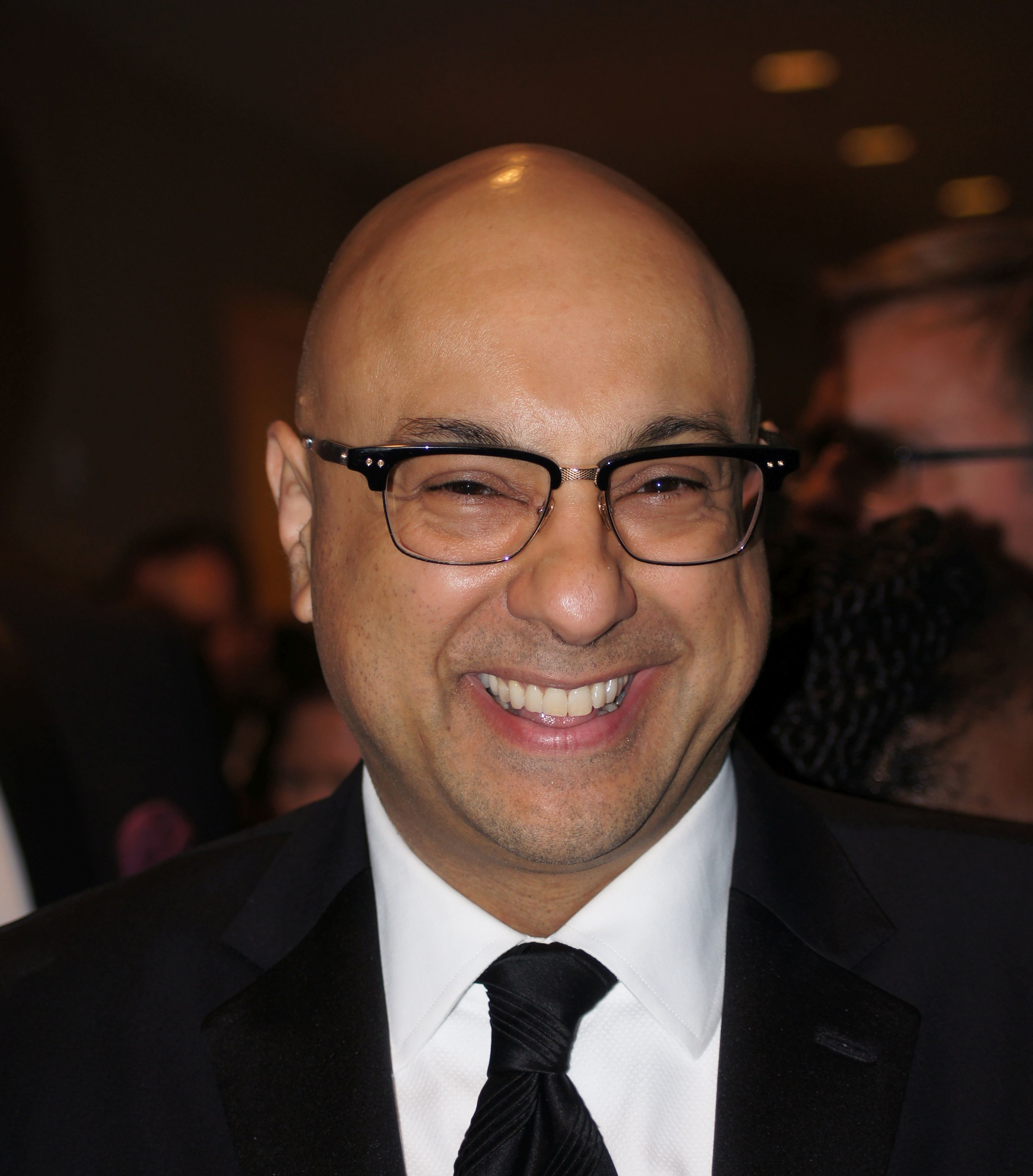
- Velshi at the 2019 White House Correspondents Dinner
- Born: October 29, 1968 or 1969 (age 57–58); Nairobi, Kenya
- Education: Queen's University
- Occupations: Broadcast journalist, author
- Agents: N.S. Bienstock, New York (literary); Greater Talent Network (speaking)
- Notable credits: American Morning; Anderson Cooper 360°; The Situation Room; Your Money; Real Money with Ali Velshi; Ali Velshi on Target; Velshi & Ruhle; The 11th Hour with Ali Velshi
- Title: Anchor; Chief business correspondent
- Relatives: Murad Velshi (father), Shaf Keshavjee, Mohamed Keshavjee
- Website: alivelshi.com

Ali Velshi (born October 29, 1969) is a Canadian business correspondent and anchor for MS NOW. He is the host of The 11th Hour with Ali Velshi on MS NOW. He is based in New York City. Known for his work on CNN, he was CNN's chief business correspondent, anchor of CNN's Your Money, and a co-host of World Business Today, a CNN International's weekday business show. In 2013, he joined Al Jazeera America, a channel that launched in August 2013. He hosted Ali Velshi on Target until Al Jazeera America ceased operations on April 12, 2016. He began working for MSNBC in October 2016.

== Personal life ==
Ali Velshi's family is from India; in 1961 they moved to Kenya. He was born in Nairobi, Kenya and grew up in Toronto after moving there in 1971. He is an Ismaili Muslim of Gujarati descent. He is the son of Murad Velshi, the first Canadian of Indian origin elected to the Legislative Assembly of Ontario, and the son of Mila, also Indian, who originally was from South Africa. His parents operated a bakery in South Africa and left for Kenya in 1960, with apartheid becoming oppressive. In Toronto, his parents operate a chain of travel agencies.

Velshi attended Northern Secondary School in Toronto and he was elected school president. He earned a degree in religious studies from Queen's University in Kingston, Ontario, in 1994. While a student at Queen's he made news by organizing protests against Preston Manning and Canada's Reform Party. In 2010, he was awarded the Queen's University Alumni Achievement Award. In 2016, Velshi was awarded an honorary doctorate of laws by his alma mater.

He was married briefly in his twenties. In 2009, he and New York–born hedge fund manager Lori Wachs married. She is the president of Cross Ledge Investments in Philadelphia. They met when she was a guest on his show and have a daughter. Velshi divides his time between an apartment in New York City and his home in Montgomery County, Pennsylvania.

== Career ==
In 1996, Velshi was awarded a fellowship to the United States Congress from the American Political Science Association. In that capacity he worked with Lee H. Hamilton, a Democratic representative from Indiana.

=== Television ===
In Toronto, Velshi began his professional reporting career as a general assignment reporter for CFTO. He later became a business reporter and anchor for CablePulse 24 and its sister station CityTV. In 1999, he joined Report on Business Television, (which changed names to BNN Bloomberg-Business News Network), Canada's first all-business news specialty channel. He hosted The Business News, which was Canada's first prime-time business news hour.

==== CNN ====
Velshi moved to the U.S. in September 2001, joining CNNfn, a business news channel in Columbus Circle, Manhattan. He anchored several shows including Insights, Business Unusual, Street Sweep, and Your Money; he also co-hosted The Money Gang with Pat Kiernan before the network closed in December 2004. Reassigned to CNN, he remained a business anchor and reporter posted initially to CNN's early-morning program Daybreak. In 2005, Velshi hosted 13 hour-long episodes of The Turnaround, a reality television show. For the program, he traveled across the U.S. introducing small business owners who were facing challenges or seeking to grow their businesses to high-profile mentors who helped small business owners develop a plan for success.

After The Turnaround, Velshi was assigned to a new show, The Situation Room from 2005 to 2006. He joined American Morning as business correspondent in late 2006 and again as co-anchor in 2011. In 2008, he undertook a cross-country road trip aboard the CNN Election Express; during the trip he traveled from Myrtle Beach, South Carolina, to Los Angeles making stops to discuss money topics with the public. For 10 days he rode the CNN Election Express through rural Texas before the Texas primary on March 4, 2008.

Velshi regularly was a substitute anchor for CNN programs including American Morning. On Saturday and Sunday he co-hosted a business program called Your Money. Additionally, he hosted CNN's Energy Hunt in 2008, taking him to places like the Arctic National Wildlife Refuge in Alaska and to the Athabasca oil sands in northeastern Alberta. He had airtime during tragedies, reporting from the Marriott Hotel (which was destroyed) in Islamabad, Pakistan, after the killing of Benazir Bhutto. During coverage of Gustav and Ike, Velshi appeared on air, on location from hurricane-stricken areas, as the storms made landfall.

During the 2008 financial crisis, Velshi again appeared on television frequently throughout the day on shows including American Morning and Anderson Cooper 360°. Velshi took viewers' live calls during special editions of Your Money and during a weekly call-in radio show of his. Until leaving CNN, he co-hosted the market opening edition of World Business Today on CNN International. Being a Muslim, Velshi regularly acknowledges his background and perspective when discussions involve Islam. He has strongly defended the Muslim community's right to build a mosque and Islamic center, Park51 near Ground Zero in Lower Manhattan. He has been critical of Peter King's hearings on Islamic radicalization in the United States as a form of Islamophobia, branding King as being "naive". Velshi supports the separation of mosque and state, rejecting "Political Islam". Political Islam requires the implementation of Sharia law.

==== Al Jazeera America ====
On April 4, 2013, it was announced that Velshi would be leaving CNN to join Al Jazeera America to host a weekly 30-minute magazine-style prime-time program called Real Money with Ali Velshi. He was the first on-air personality to be hired for the channel. AJA hoped that Velshi's show would initially start off as a weekly show and become a daily show by the end of 2013. Real Money with Ali Velshi launched on August 20, 2013, as a daily weekday show. On May 12, 2015, the show relaunched as Ali Velshi on Target. The show ended in April 2016 when Al Jazeera America closed.

==== MSNBC and NBC; MS NOW ====
Velshi joined MSNBC in October 2016, with additional duties at MSNBC's parent news division, NBC News and was a business correspondent. He initially co-anchored Velshi & Ruhle, a 1:00 pm ET MSNBC news program with Stephanie Ruhle, as well as hosting MSNBC Live with Ali Velshi., his own 3:00 PM ET news show. He was appointed as the fill-in host of The Last Word with Lawrence O'Donnell for Friday's edition. In December 2019, it was announced that he would move to a morning show, Velshi. The last episode of Velshi aired June 7, 2026. Velshi became the host of the MS NOW program The 11th Hour beginning June 15, 2026.

=== Writings ===
Velshi is represented by the New York literary agency N.S. Bienstock and by Greater Talent Network, an agency for speakers. His first book, Gimme My Money Back: Your Guide to Beating the Financial Crisis, was published on January 2, 2009. Another book, How to Speak Money: The Language & Knowledge You Need Now, co-authored by longtime friend and co-anchor Christine Romans, was released by John Wiley & Sons in November 2011.

== Awards and recognition ==
In 2010, Velshi was awarded the Queen's University Alumni Achievement Award; the highest award given to Queen's University alumni. Also in 2010, Velshi's in-depth reporting for CNN's "How the Wheels Came Off" about the near collapse of the U.S. auto industry was honored with a National Headliner Award for Business & Consumer Reporting. He anchored CNN's global breaking news coverage of an attempted terror attack on a Delta flight into Detroit on Christmas Day 2009, for which CNN was nominated for a 2010 Emmy award. He was nominated for two additional News & Documentary Emmy awards in 2015 for his contributions at Al Jazeera, including coverage of low wages paid to disabled American workers and a scandal involving red light cameras in Chicago.

=== Honors ===
Honorary degrees

Location	Date	School	Degree	Gave Commencement Address
Ontario	7 June 2016	Queen's University	Doctor of Laws (LL.D)	Yes

== In popular culture ==
Referencing Velshi's signature bald pate, Jon Stewart has referred to Velshi as the "Hairless Prophet of Doom" on The Daily Show; the "H-POD" moniker is frequently repeated by others. Stephen Colbert referred to Velshi as "CNN's business reporter from our hairless, raceless future" on an episode of The Colbert Report wherein he discussed the 2008 financial crisis.

In addition to appearing on The Daily Show, Velshi appeared on The Oprah Winfrey Show on October 3, 2008, during the 2008 financial crisis and on The View on February 4, 2009, after the launch of his first book about the crisis. Velshi played himself in the 2010 Oliver Stone film Wall Street: Money Never Sleeps.

During the recurring intro segment of season 7 of Homeland at the 30 second-mark, there is an audio clip of Velshi saying, "the mood of the country. It's not great." The audio clip was taken from the August 30, 2017, edition of MSNBC's The 11th Hour when Velshi was a guest host. He said, "A new Fox News poll gives us an even closer look at the mood of the country. It's not great."

== Memberships and non-profit work ==
Velshi is a member of the Council on Foreign Relations, the Economic Club of New York, the New York Financial Writers Association, the Paley Center for Media. He is a member of the Board of Trustees of the Chicago History Museum, the Board of Trustees of Seeds of Peace, and a member of the Grand Challenges Advisory Committee of the National Academy of Engineering. He is on the Board of Trustees of the Xprize Foundation, a non-profit organization that designs and manages public competitions intended to encourage technological development able to benefit humanity.

== See also ==
- Broadcast journalism
- Gujarati people
- Indians in the New York City metropolitan region
- New Yorkers in journalism
