= David Kramer =

David Kramer may refer to:

== Arts and entertainment ==
- David Kramer (singer) (born 1951), South African singer, songwriter, playwright and director
- David Kramer (talent agent) (born 1969), American talent agency executive

== Politics ==
- David Kramer (Marshallese politician) (born 1969), Minister of Justice of the Marshall Islands
- David J. Kramer (born 1964), United States Assistant Secretary of State for Democracy, Human Rights, and Labor, 2008–2009
- David M. Kramer (politician) (born c. 1920), American politician from New York

== Sport ==
- David Krämer (born 1997), German professional basketball player
- David Kramer (soccer) (born 1972), American soccer goalkeeper

== Other people ==
- David M. Kramer (biophysicist) (born 1961), American biophysicist
