= Ubben =

Ubben is a surname. Notable people with the surname include:

- Jeffrey W. Ubben (born 1961 or 1962), American businessman
- Kerstin Ubben (born 1968), German badminton player
- Kurt Ubben (1911–1944), German fighter ace during World War II
