= United Talent Agency =

American talent agency

- Type: Private
- Founded: 1991; 35 years ago
- Founders: Peter Benedek; Jim Berkus
- Headquarters: 9336 Civic Center Drive, Beverly Hills, California, United States
- Key people: Paul Wachter (chairman); David Kramer (CEO); Jay Sures (vice chairman); Rich Paul (co-head of sports division)
- Number of employees: 2,200 (2024)
- Divisions: UTA Brand Studio; Creators; Film; UTA Foundation; UTA IQ; UTA Marketing; UTA Music; News & Broadcast; Speakers; UTA Sports; TV; UTA Ventures
- Website: unitedtalent.com

United Talent Agency (UTA) is a talent agency based in Beverly Hills, California. Established in 1991, it represents artists and other professionals across the entertainment industry. As of 2024, the company has approximately 2,200 employees. UTA has divisions focused on film, television, music, sports, creators, books, video games, branding and licensing, speaking, marketing, news, and broadcasting, among others. The agency also operates the non-profit UTA Foundation.

== Corporate overview ==
UTA, established in 1991, is a private company representing talent in a variety of industries, including film, television, creators, publishing, music, and sports. It is one of the largest such agencies in the world, with approximately 300 agents representing actors, directors, producers, recording artists, writers, and other professionals. Its services also include brand management, film financing and packaging, licensing, marketing, strategic management, and venture capital financing for companies. UTA has approximately 2,200 employees.

The company operates as a partnership, co-founded by Jim Berkus, Peter Benedek and Jeremy Zimmer. The latter was chief executive officer (CEO) until 2025, when he was succeeded by David Kramer, who had been president. Paul Wachter is chairman and Jay Sures is vice chairman. All are on the twelve-member board of directors.

== History ==
=== Founding and early history ===
United Talent Agency was established in 1991 through the merger of the Bauer-Benedek Agency and Leading Artists Agency. Jim Berkus, Jeremy Zimmer, and Peter Benedek are UTA's co-founders.

UTA had 10 partners and 40 agents by mid-1994. The company began compiling a weekly list of mostly entry-level employment opportunities across the entertainment industry, which was described by the Los Angeles Times in 2001 as "among the most coveted documents in wannabe Hollywood". In mid 1996, the company had expanded to 45 agents and was described in the media as one of Hollywood's "big four" agencies.

By the early 2000s, the agency had become known for its roster of comedians including Jim Carrey, Dave Chappelle, Will Ferrell, and Ben Stiller, along with writers for popular comedy television programs. UTA was also known for its television talent, representing clients such as David Chase and Dick Wolf. In 2006, the Los Angeles Times described UTA as a "tastemaker" agency, noting clients such as Don Cheadle, Johnny Depp, and M. Night Shyamalan. The agency established "UTA U" in 2008 to provide skills training to interns by partners and other executives. The program also includes a community service component. UTA was inducted into Vanity Fair's "New Establishment Hall of Fame" in 2010.

=== Recent history ===
In 2011, UTA relocated its headquarters to a Civic Center Drive complex, which was renamed UTA Plaza. The company acquired N.S. Bienstock, one of the largest agencies for television news talent in the United States, in January 2014. N.S. Bienstock represented more than 600 television news anchors, reporters, and producers. Richard Leibner and Carole Cooper continued in their roles as co-presidents of N.S. Bienstock. The merger made UTA the largest company representing television news talent. In 2017, UTA did not renew O'Reilly's contract due to allegations of sexual harassment. The venture was rebranded UTA News & Broadcast in 2017.

The agency created a new publishing imprint called Keywords Press in May 2014, to publish books by internet entertainers. UTA partnered with Atria Publishing Group, a division of Simon & Schuster, to create the imprint. Keywords announced deals with Shane Dawson, Connor Franta, and Joey Graceffa.

In 2015, UTA hired a dozen agents from Creative Artists Agency in what was widely characterized in the media as a "midnight raid". Creative Artists Agency filed a lawsuit in response. Also in that year, the company took a minority investment from Jeffrey W. Ubben, founder and CEO of ValueAct Capital, who became a non-voting UTA board member. ValueAct also was invested in 21st Century Fox, Adobe Systems, CB Richard Ellis, and Microsoft at the time. UTA acquired The Agency Group (TAG), the world's largest independent music agency, in August 2015. TAG had approximately 95 agents working in cities including London, Los Angeles, and New York, and brought around 2,000 artists into UTA's client portfolio, including Muse, Paramore and The Black Keys. UTA expanded its New York City offices in 2016.

In early 2017, UTA held several events relating to political and social movements. In lieu of its annual Academy Awards party, UTA organized a "United Voices" rally outside the company's Beverly Hills headquarters two days before the 89th Academy Awards, in response to President Donald Trump's signing of Executive Order 13769, commonly referred to as the "Muslim travel ban". As many as 2,000 demonstrators attended in support of refugee relief and freedom of speech. UTA also contributed $250,000, plus $70,000 collected via crowdfunding, to the American Civil Liberties Union and the International Rescue Committee. The company hosted events for female employees in Los Angeles, New York, and Toronto as part of the Day Without a Woman.

In March 2017, UTA acquired an equity stake in the investment banking firm AGM Partners to give the agency and its clients guidance on investments in the media and entertainment sector. UTA acquired Greater Talent Network (GTN), which focuses on public speaking engagements, in September 2017. Don Epstein, GTN's founder and CEO was named a partner at UTA. GTN continued to operate from its offices in Florida and New York City.

The New York Observer named UTA one of "Hollywood's 7 Most Powerful Talent Agencies" in November 2017. In December, the agency also hosted Anita Hill at its offices during the early days of the Me Too movement, and provided support to the industry's Commission on Sexual Harassment and Advancing Equality in the Workplace, which Hill went on to lead. UTA became a founding donor of Time's Up in early 2018, committing $1 million to the organization against sexual harassment in the workplace in response to the Weinstein effect and Me Too movement. UTA acquired Circle Talent Agency, which focuses on dance and electronic music, in April 2018.

In 2019, UTA partnered with NBA entrepreneur and agent Rich Paul to start a Sports division, putting it in direct competition with Creative Artists Agency and William Morris Endeavor, Paul expanded UTA's sports clients from 4 to 23 and in 2020 joined the company's board of directors. In 2019 he was named "Power Broker of the Year" by GQ magazine.

UTA purchased a majority stake in the sports agency Klutch Sports Group in 2019.

In 2021, UTA continued its growth and diversification by acquiring strategic advisory firm MediaLink, launching an NFT practice, announcing a $200-million Special purpose acquisition company, IPO and opened a full-service office in Atlanta.

In June 2022, UTA acquired UK-based literary and talent agency Curtis Brown.

In June 2023, UTA acquired New York-based executive search and consulting firm James & Co.

In November 2023, Susan Sarandon was dropped by the agency for her controversial remarks at a rally stating "There are a lot of people afraid of being Jewish at this time, and are getting a taste of what it feels like to be a Muslim in this country, so often subjected to violence."

In January 2024, seven CalArts alumni withdrew from an exhibition at UTA Artist Space saying that the venue would not allow them to add pro-Palestine messages to their artist statements. The same year, the Fine Arts division activities were suspended.

In 2024, UTA acquired the creative, marketing, and research agency JUV Consulting, as well as the association football agency Representatives of Outstanding Footballers (ROOF), which had approximately 150 clients in the Bundesliga, La Liga, Ligue 1, Premier League, and Serie A at the time.

UTA signed businesswoman and social media influencer Becca Bloom in April 2025. In June 2025, UTA dropped Bob Vylan as a client following anti-IDF chants at the Glastonbury Festival 2025 that were criticized by British politicians and other pro-Israel advocates as antisemitic.

== UTA Foundation ==
The foundation was established by Rene Jones in c. 2004. Among initiatives are Live Inspired, which allows employees to focus on philanthropic efforts during a sabbatical, and Project Impact, which has worked with various organizations and encourages employees to offer community service.
