= Ali Velshi on Target =

- Title Card
- Created by: Al Jazeera America / Ali Velshi / John Meehan
- Presented by: Ali Velshi
- Country of origin: United States

Production
- Production location: New York City
- Running time: 30 Minutes

Original release
- Network: Al Jazeera America
- Release: August 2013 – March 2016

Ali Velshi on Target (formerly Real Money with Ali Velshi) was a daily thirty-minute program on Al Jazeera America hosted by Ali Velshi that focuses on current affairs that provides context and analysis around current political and economic issues along with interviews.

The show was shot and produced in New York City and originally shared studio space with Consider This, another Al Jazeera America show. Real Money aired at 10:30pm eastern time Monday through Friday with repeats overnight and on weekends.

The show featured guest appearances by Suze Orman among others. In Velshi's absence the show's substitute host is David Shuster. The show's producer is head of business news John Meehan.

The show also was done from occasion on location with Velshi typically at economic conventions and other places. The show was also in the past hosted from Al Jazeera America's studios at the Newseum in Washington D.C.

== History ==
Former title of the show

Real Money with Ali Velshi was the first show announced by Al Jazeera America shortly after they had hired Velshi from CNN. At CNN, Velshi was the long-time host of a show called Your Money. Prior to Al Jazeera America's launch, the show was originally going to start as a weekly program and progress to a daily by the end of 2013 but the show ended up becoming a daily show with the channel's launch.

It began as a strictly financial program that focused on the American and global economy and how it affects the average person. It also looks at how national and world events affect or could affect the economy and looks at everyday economic issues and tries to deliver actionable solutions. This is done through in-depth stories on a particular topic and through interviews done by Velshi with economic scholars, economic advisers and small business owners who are affected by the story. The show later expended to cover more current affairs topics.

The show was originally 30 minutes from 7 to 7:30 pm eastern time from its launch but was later expanded to a full hour on April 21, 2014. The show was reduced back to thirty minutes and moved to the prime time slot of 10:30 pm eastern on February 2 replacing its former studio mate Consider This with Velshi explaining that the show does better in a thirty-minute format. The show moved to 9:00 pm on November 2, 2015.

On May 11, the show was re-branded as Ali Velshi on Target. The new show focuses on both the economy and politics with a more hard-hitting format.

The show maintained a relationship with the Al Jazeera English counterpart economic program Counting the Cost.
