= Antonio Mora =

American journalist and news anchor

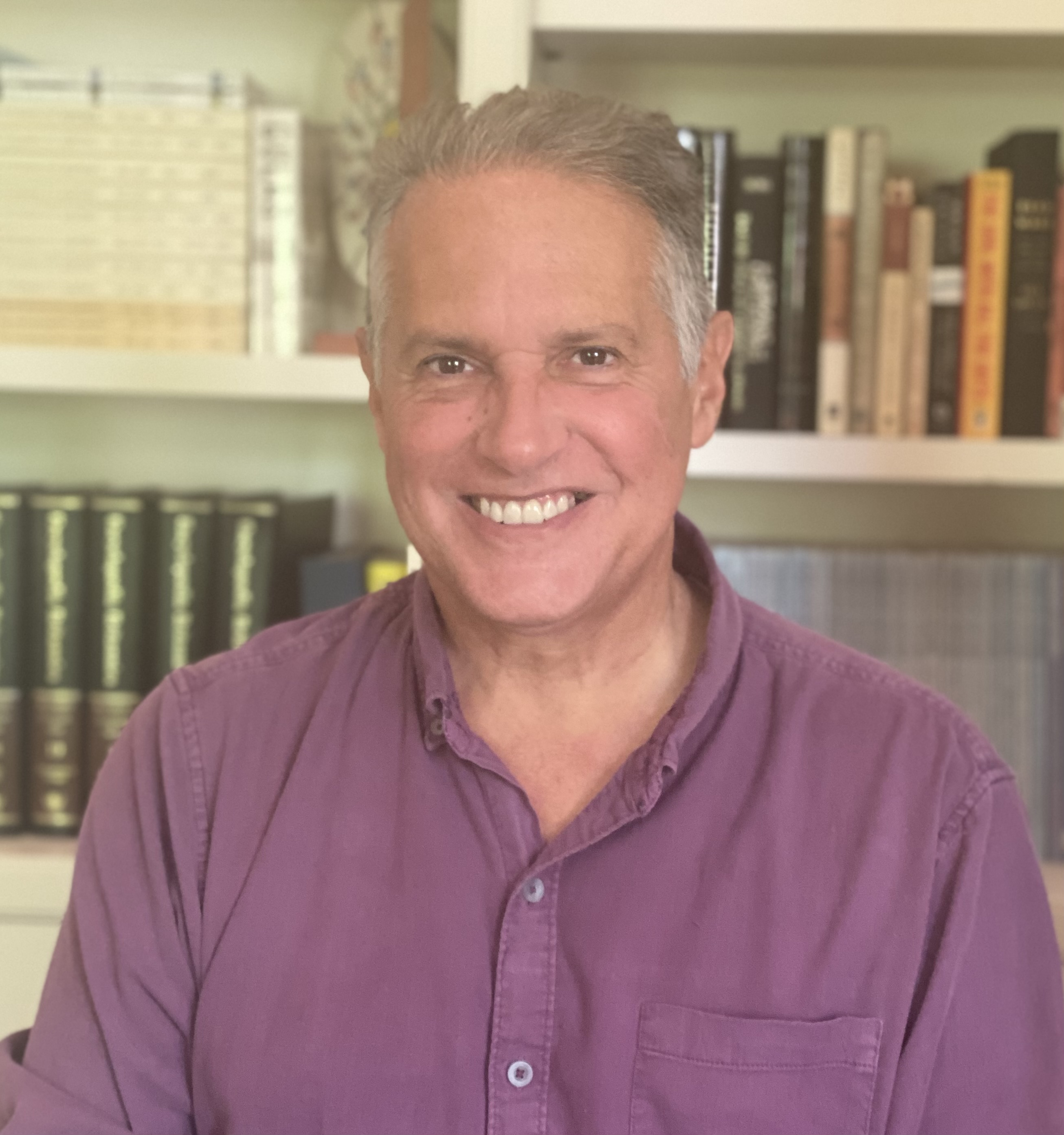
- Antonio Mora, University of Miami, 2022
- Born: December 14, 1957 (age 68); Havana, Cuba
- Education: Harvard Law School, (LLM)
- Occupations: Journalist, Anchorman, Professor, Columnist
- Notable credit(s): Consider This; Good Morning America; Good Morning America Sunday "A View from the Center"
- Relatives: Cosme de la Torriente y Peraza (great-grandfather); Alfonso Mora (brother); Maite Delgado (sister-in-law); Ines Rivero (former sister-in-law)

Antonio Mora (born December 14, 1957) is a multiple Emmy Award winning journalist and television news anchor. He is best known for his years at ABC News, including his four years as the news anchor and chief correspondent for Good Morning America. He was also a prime-time anchor on Al Jazeera America where he hosted an interview show called Consider This. He was the first Hispanic American male to anchor a primetime newscast in Chicago and one of the only Hispanic American males to anchor a national broadcast news show.

Mora is currently the Wolfson Chair in Communication at the University of Miami's Wolfson School of Communication where he teaches journalism. He also writes the online newsletter "A View from the Center," which he originally created as a columnist for Facebook's defunct Bulletin platform.

== Personal ==
Mora's family left Cuba in 1960. He grew up in the United States and Caracas, Venezuela. He received a law degree, summa cum laude, from the Universidad Católica Andrés Bello in Caracas and an LL.M. from Harvard Law School. Before becoming a broadcaster, he was a corporate finance attorney at Debevoise & Plimpton in Manhattan. He is the great grandson of Cuban politician and League of Nations President Cosme de la Torriente y Peraza. He is the brother of former ATP touring pro, Alfonso Mora, brother-in-law of TV host Maite Delgado and former brother-in-law of model Ines Rivero.

== Professional ==
Mora began his broadcasting career as a sports anchor and reporter for Univision’s New York station WXTV. He then worked as an anchor and producer for Telemundo’s New York station, WNJU-TV. He was one of the original announcers for ESPN’s international transmissions to Latin America and one of the original anchors for NBC News Nightside, the overnight national newscast for the NBC Network. He then served as a reporter and anchor for WTVJ in Miami and was the original co-host of Good Day L.A. for KTTV in Los Angeles, before being hired by ABC as the host of Good Morning America Sunday and correspondent for Good Morning America. He later reported for virtually all of ABC News’ broadcasts, including Nightline and 20/20, covering news from more than a dozen countries on four continents. He also anchored ABC News’ breaking news coverage and served as a correspondent for World News Tonight with Peter Jennings and as a regular substitute anchor for the weekend edition of World News Tonight. In 1999, he became the news anchor for Good Morning America at the time when Diane Sawyer and Charles Gibson became the co-hosts of the show. Four years later, he left for Chicago where he served as the main anchor at the CBS owned-and-operated WBBM-TV until 2008. He was a news anchor at CBS owned-and-operated WFOR-TV in Miami until December 17, 2012. On July 26, 2013, he was hired to host a weeknight current affairs talk show called Consider This on Al Jazeera America where he later anchored an international news hour.

He is also an experienced debate moderator, having moderated gubernatorial debates in Illinois and Florida, and senatorial and congressional debates in Florida.

=== Awards ===
Mora has received awards for reporting, anchoring, breaking-news anchoring, interviewing and commentary. His honors include two Peabody Awards, a national Edward R. Murrow Award, three national Emmy Awards, nine local Emmy Awards and a Silver Dome. He was named one of the country's “100 Most Influential Hispanics” by Hispanic Business Magazine in 1999. He received honorary doctorates from Our Lady of Holy Cross College and Ursinus College.

=== Associations and charitable work ===
He is a member of the Council on Foreign Relations and is a former Vice President of Broadcast for the National Association of Hispanic Journalists. He is a member of the Board of Governors of the National Academy of Television Arts and Sciences Suncoast Chapter, and a former member of the boards of trustees of the Abraham Lincoln Bicentennial Foundation, the Goodman Theatre, the Chicago Children's Choir and the Latin School of Chicago.

=== Film credit and other activities ===
He had a cameo appearance in the 1994 film Speed starring Sandra Bullock. Mora gained notoriety on YouTube after a video of him breaking into a fit of laughter with WFOR co-anchor Shannon Hori when reading a story about injuries suffered during sex that included "fractured penises" went viral and was featured on The Tonight Show with Jay Leno.
