= Jeremy Zimmer =

American entertainment executive (born 1958)

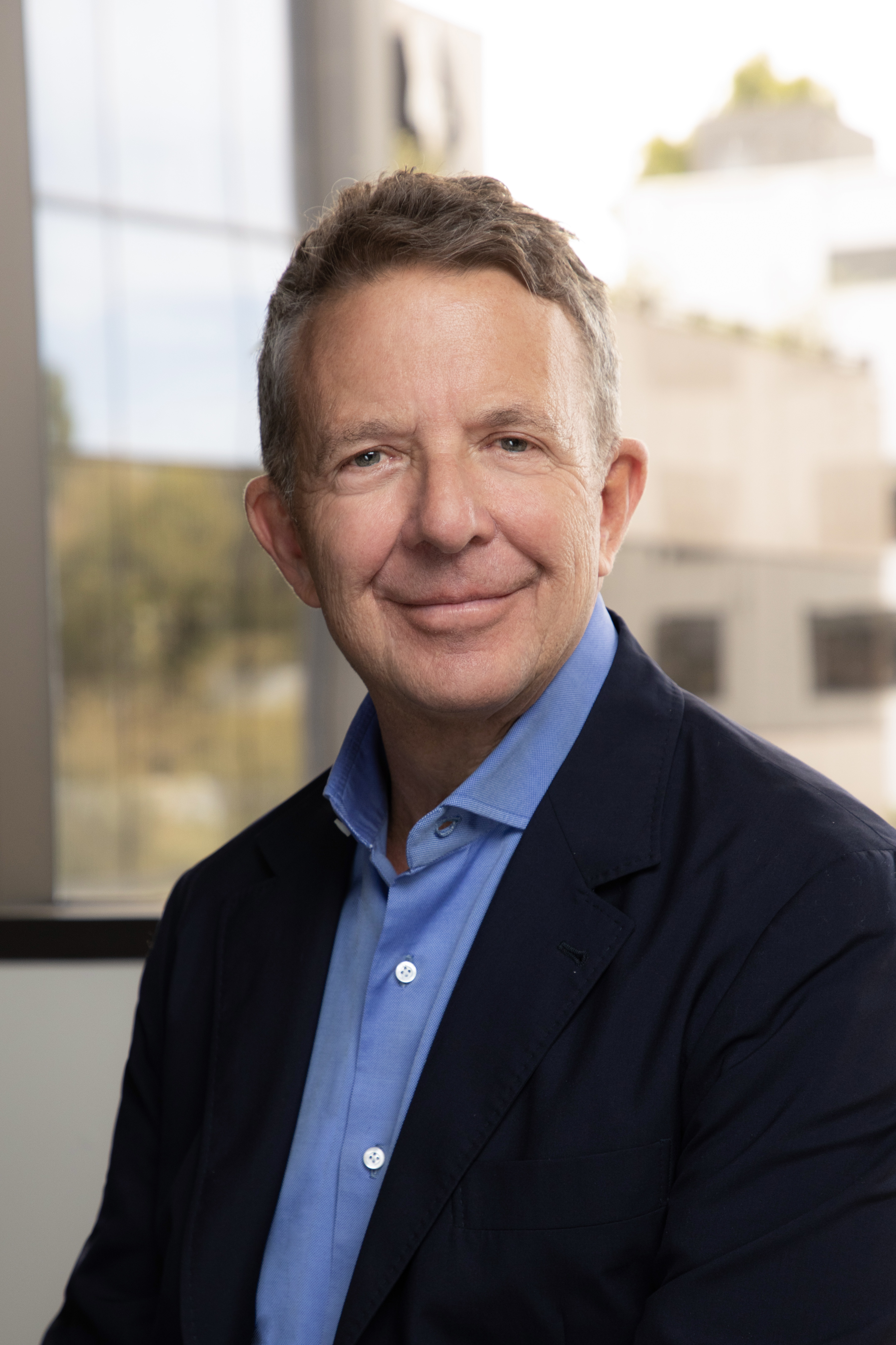
- Zimmer in 2023
- Born: April 17, 1958 (age 68)
- Title: former CEO of United Talent Agency
- Spouses: First wife (divorced); Marisa Lynn Miller (m. 2004)
- Children: 4
- Parents: Jon Zimmer (father); Jill Schary Robinson (mother)
- Relatives: Dore Schary (grandfather)

Signature
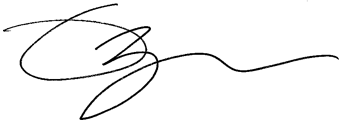

Jeremy Zimmer (born April 17, 1958) is an American entertainment industry executive who is the executive chairman of the board of directors of United Talent Agency (UTA). He co-founded the agency and was the CEO from 2012 to 2025.

== Early life and education ==
Zimmer is the son of novelist Jill Schary Robinson and stockbroker Jon Zimmer, and the grandson of Metro-Goldwyn-Mayer studio chief Dore Schary. His family is Jewish. He was raised on the West Coast of the United States, but relocated during his senior year of high school so Robinson could focus on her career. Zimmer attended, but did not graduate from, Boston University.

== Career ==
In 1979, at the age of 19, Zimmer left college to work in the William Morris Agency mailroom. After transferring to Los Angeles, he joined ICM Partners in 1984. There, Zimmer became a talent agent, working on films such as Die Hard (1988), The Fisher King (1991), and In the Line of Fire (1993). He later ran the agency's Motion Picture Literary and Motion Picture Packaging divisions. In 1989, Zimmer left ICM for Bauer/Benedek Agency, where he became a partner. In 1991, the firm combined with Leading Artists Agency to form United Talent Agency (UTA).

Zimmer headed UTA's literary department from 1997–2006. He has been credited with creating the agency's branding, licensing, and endorsements division, as well as UTA's agent training program. Zimmer was the agency's chief executive officer from 2012 to 2025 when he was named the executive chairman of the board of directors. Throughout his career as an agent, Zimmer has represented Mariah Carey, Bryan Cranston, DJ Khaled, Chelsea Handler, Kevin Hart, Anthony Hopkins, Marc Lawrence, Brian Robbins, M. Night Shyamalan, and YG.

Schary and Zimmer ranked number eight in Vanity Fair's 2017 list of the "25 Most Important Families in Hollywood History". Zimmer, along with United Talent Agency Managing Directors David Kramer and Jay Sures, ranked number 33 on The Hollywood Reporter's 2017 list of the 100 "most powerful people in entertainment".

== Personal life ==
Zimmer has been married twice. In 2004, Zimmer married his second wife, Marisa Lynn Miller, in a civil ceremony in Brentwood, California. Her father co-founded the Miller's Outpost retail chain of stores. He has four children.
