= Jay Sures =

American talent agent and executive

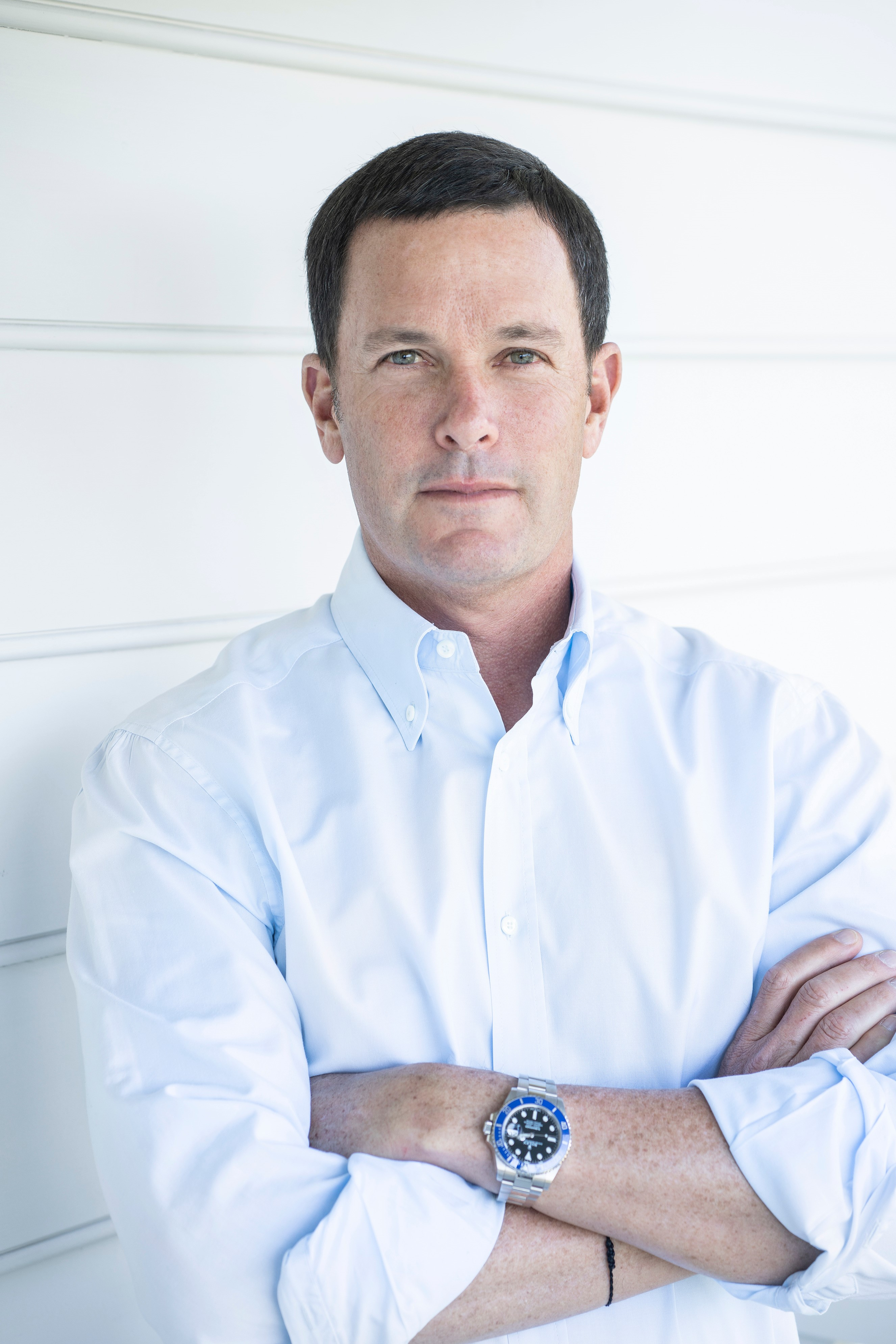
- Sures in 2022
- Born: November 2, 1966 (age 60); Canada
- Education: University of California, Los Angeles
- Employer: United Talent Agency
- Title: Vice Chairman
- Board member of: Regents of the University of California
- Spouse: Linda Nyvltova
- Children: 3

Jay Sures (born November 2, 1966) is an American entertainment industry executive and talent agent, and vice chairman of United Talent Agency.

== Early life and education ==
Born in 1966 in Canada, Sures was raised in Los Angeles and is of Jewish descent. He graduated from the University of California, Los Angeles, where he has been an assistant visiting professor for the UCLA School of Theater, Film and Television.

== Career ==
Sures' career with United Talent Agency (UTA) began with the establishment of the agency in 1991, where he worked in the mailroom and assisted co-founder Peter Benedek. He became a talent agent when UTA first formed, and was promoted to partner in 1998. Sures joined the board of directors in 2003. He and David Kramer held managing director roles starting in 2010, and both became co-presidents in September 2017. Sures was named vice chairman of UTA in September 2022. Sures is also a co-founder of the UTA Foundation, the agency's non-profit organization.

Sures leads the agency's news, broadcast and television divisions, as well as the acquired Greater Talent Network speakers division. He began managing UTA's news and broadcast division after leading the agency's 2014 acquisition of N.S. Bienstock.

Sures was appointed to the Television Academy's Executive Committee in 2014, and inducted into Broadcasting & Cable's Hall of Fame in 2016.

Throughout his career, Sures represents or has represented Fareed Zakaria, Brian Kilameade, David Muir, Anderson Cooper, Bret Baier, Norah O'Donnell, Margaret Brennan, Jen Psaki, Jake Tapper, Chuck Todd, Elizabeth Vargas, Bill Hemmer, Jenna Bush Hager, Chuck Lorre, Steve Levitan, Darren Star, Larry Wilmore, and Ryan Seacrest.

Sures led contract negotiations between United Talent Agency and the Writers Guild of America. Focusing primarily on a practice known as packaging, the impasse resulted in a lawsuit and WGA members firing their agents in April 2019. After months of backchannel negotiations, Sures announced that United Talent Agency had reached an agreement with the Writer's Guild, becoming the first major talent agency to do so.

Beginning in 2016, Sures has hosted an annual party in Washington, D.C., the night before the White House Correspondents Dinner that blends the worlds of politics, entertainment and media.

In September 2023, Sures was named chairman of the board of Triad National Security, which manages the Los Alamos National Laboratory. He is chairman of the board of governors that oversees the Lawrence Livermore National Laboratory. Both labs are managed in part by the University of California and the Department of Energy.

In October 2023, Sures in his role as a UC regent, publicly rebuked the UC Ethnic Studies Faculty Council request that UC leaders retract their statement declaring the October 7 attack by Hamas on Israel “an act of terrorism…that deserves and requires our collective condemnation.” In November, the UC Regents committed $7 million to emergency mental health services, programs focused on better understanding antisemitism and Islamophobia, and training for faculty and staff on how to navigate their roles as educators. In 2025, a UCLA student group organized a pro-Palestinian demonstration outside Sures's house. Approximately 50 to 100 people attended the protest and the UCLA Police Department filed a vandalism report.

In October 2025, Sures was recognized by Jewish Federation Los Angeles for "his commitment to the Jewish community in the face of historical rates of antisemitism", according to The Hollywood Reporter.

On April 20th, UC Berkeley's Law Students for Justice in Palestine hosted an activist convicted of an Israeli car bombing. Sures denounced the event on Fox News Digital as "disgusting and abhorrent."

In 2026, Sures was elected to a lifetime membership on the Council On Foreign Relations.

== Personal life ==
Sures joined the Entertainment Industry Foundation's board of directors in 2008. In 2019, Sures was appointed to the Regents of the University of California for a term ending in 2032.
