= Amina Jindani =

Clinical trialist (born 1936)

Amina Jindani is a clinical trialist and tuberculosis researcher known for her work on the evaluation of drug treatments for tuberculosis. Her research contributed to the development of methods for assessing the early activity of antituberculosis drugs and to international clinical trials investigating the effectiveness and duration of treatment regimens.

== Early life and education ==
Amina Jindani FRCP
- Amina Jindani in 2025
- Born: 8 May 1936 (age 90)
- Citizenship: Tanzanian, Canadian, British
- Education: Royal Free Hospital School of Medicine, University of London (MBBS 1962; MD 1979)
- Known for: Tuberculosis clinical trials; early bactericidal activity research
- Scientific career
- Fields: Clinical trials; Tuberculosis
- Workplaces: City St George's, University of London (2004–present) University of Cape Town (2019–2024) International Union Against Tuberculosis and Lung Disease (1994–2004) University of Toronto (1977–1980) Medical Research Council (United Kingdom) (1970–1977)
- Thesis: The effect of single and multiple drugs on the viable count of M. tuberculosis in the sputum of patients with pulmonary tuberculosis during the early days of treatment. ((1980))

Jindani was born in Zanzibar in 1936 and attended schools in East Africa and England. She studied medicine at the Royal Free Hospital School of Medicine, University of London, graduating in 1962. She completed a Doctor of Medicine degree at the University of London, researching the effects of single and combined drugs on the viable Mycobacterium tuberculosis bacteria found in patients’ sputum during the early stages of treatment.

== Research and career ==
Jindani worked with the British Medical Research Council and the East African Tuberculosis Investigation Centre during the 1970s, contributing to clinical trials of short course chemotherapy for pulmonary tuberculosis. In the management of tuberculosis these studies formed part of the research that established shorter treatment regimens as an alternative to the longer courses previously used.

Her doctoral research led to work on the early bactericidal activity assay, a method for measuring how rapidly antituberculosis drugs reduce the number of viable bacteria in patients’ sputum. Published in 1980, this research helped establish a method for evaluating the early bactericidal activity of antituberculosis drug's.

After coordinating clinical trial s in Canada and working in clinical research in France, Jindani became coordinator of clinical trials at the International Union Against Tuberculosis and Lung Disease in Paris in 1994. She subsequently led international studies evaluating tuberculosis treatments.

Jindani was chief investigator of Study A, an international randomised controlled trial conducted between 1998 and 2004. The study compared two eight-month treatment regimens with a six-month regimen for newly diagnosed pulmonary tuberculosis. It found that the eight-month regimens were less effective than the six-month comparator. The results contributed to the evidence informing changes to World Health Organization treatment recommendations in 2010.

In April 2004, Jindani joined the Department of Infection and Immunity at St George’s, University of London, as an Honorary Senior Lecturer. There, she established the International Consortium for Trials of Chemotherapeutic Agents in Tuberculosis (INTERTB) to coordinate international clinical trials investigating shorter treatment regimens for pulmonary tuberculosis. She later became Professor of Tuberculosis Therapeutics at St George’s.

Her subsequent work included the RIFAQUIN, RIFATOX and RIFASHORT trials, which investigated higher-dose rifamycins and shorter treatment regimens for tuberculosis. Her collaborators included Wallace Fox and Denis Mitchison. These studies contributed to international efforts to develop shorter and more effective treatments.

In 2006, Jindani established World Without TB as a civil-society organisation to support research towards the United Nations Millennium Development Goals target of eradicating tuberculosis by 2050. The organisation is now a registered charity in the United Kingdom.

== Personal life ==
Jindani married lawyer Mohamed Keshavjee in 1977.

== Recognition ==
Jindani was elected Fellow of the Royal College of Physicians (London) in 2003. She was awarded the Ibn Sina Award for Medicine in 2018. In 2019, she was awarded the Princess Chichibu Memorial Global TB Prize, which is awarded annually by the Japan Anti-Tuberculosis Association to 'A person who has made internationally recognized achievements in scientific research on tuberculosis or tuberculosis control'. More recently, Jindani was named City St George's Extraordinary Woman 2025.
