= Jim Berkus =

American entertainment industry executive

Jim Berkus is an American entertainment industry executive who is co-founder and chairman of United Talent Agency (UTA). Prior to forming UTA, Berkus was a partner at Leading Artists Agency. His clients include the Coen brothers, Barbra Streisand, and Owen Wilson. He often hosts UTA's annual Oscar parties at his home.

In 2023, Jim Berkus stepped aside from being UTA Chairman to allow Paul Wachter to lead the board into the next chapter of the growth and expansion for UTA.

As of 2025, Jim remains very actively involved at UTA as a Senior Partner and Advisor and continues representing his longtime clients Joel and Ethan Coen, Harrison Ford, Owen Wilson, Arnold Schwarzenegger, Wes Anderson, Michael Douglas, Liev Schreiber amongst others.

Berkus is married to Ria Berkus, and his son, Jordan Berkus, is also an agent at UTA.
