= N.S. Bienstock =

Large television talent agency in the United States

N.S. Bienstock, Inc.
- Company type: Subsidiary
- Industry: Talent and Literary Agencies
- Founded: 1964; 62 years ago in New York City, New York State, United States
- Headquarters: New York City, New York State
- Key people: Richard Leibner, Founder & President
- Owner: United Talent Agency
- Website: Official Website

N.S. Bienstock, Inc. is a large television talent agency in the United States, representing more than 600 television personalities. Ranked among the Top 10 of TV's most powerful, the group represents clients ranging from Dan Rather and Chris Matthews to Anderson Cooper and Bill O'Reilly.

Bienstock is a specialized agency, with most assets devoted to news and reality-based programming. Variety claims the company has a "virtual monopoly on the news biz's biggest stars" and the president of MSNBC told the New York Times that, They have a disproportionate share of America's news talent. United Talent Agency acquired N.S. Bienstock on 22nd Jan 2014."

== History ==
The company began in the 1940s as the small, New York City life insurance business of Nate Bienstock, whose client list included a number of journalists, including Walter Cronkite, Charles Collingwood and Eric Sevareid. He sold a policy to the author John Steinbeck, who had Richard Leibner's father, Sol, as an accountant. Mr. Bienstock invited Sol Leibner into his business in 1964 and eventually sold out to him.

At the time, TV news was taking off, and Bienstock's newspaper and news agency clients were in demand at the networks. They asked for his help as they negotiated their contracts. Richard Leibner—not long out of New York University's business school—took up that part of the business and built it.

His wife and partner, Carole Cooper, whom he met on a blind date in 1962 and married in 1964, left her career as a producer of commercials to join the firm and become an agent in 1976. The firm also includes their sons, Adam and Jonathan.

Leibner is the face of the company, known for beginning the trend of big news salaries in the 1980s by playing the networks against one another and getting big deals for Dan Rather and Diane Sawyer. (The two now make more than $7 million and $10 million, respectively.) In the process, he has been accused of transforming journalists into something closer to Hollywood celebrities.

The agency has been at the forefront of the broadcast news business since 1964, pioneering representation of on-air and off-air talent in syndication, cable, reality television, and talk radio over the last 40+ years. The group not only represents talent, but also pitches and packages popular programs on both television and radio.

The Radio Television Digital News Association administers a fellowship for young professional journalists endowed by N.S. Bienstock.

In 2014 N.S. Bienstock was acquired by United Talent Agency.

== List of notable present and past clients ==
- Dan Abrams
- Stephanie Abrams
- Sandra Ali
- Jose Diaz-Balart
- Glenn Beck
- Ed Bradley (deceased)
- Margaret Brennan
- Aaron Brown
- Campbell Brown
- Juju Chang
- Ti-Hua Chang
- Jane Clayson
- Lynnette Khalfani-Cox
- Anderson Cooper
- Katherine Creag (deceased)
- Phil Donahue
- Howard Fineman
- Jack Ford
- Michael Gargiulo
- Michael Gelman
- David Gregory
- Gail Kasper
- Steve Kroft
- Lars Larson
- Harvey Levin
- Steve Levy
- Tom Llamas
- Dave Malkoff
- Chris Matthews
- Jane Velez-Mitchell
- Natalie Morales
- Norah O'Donnell
- Pam Oliver
- Byron Pitts
- Dan Rather
- Bill O'Reilly
- Jeff Ranieri
- John Roberts
- Robin Roberts
- Thomas Roberts
- Andy Rooney
- Melissa Russo
- Diane Sawyer
- Bob Schieffer
- Bob Simon (deceased)
- Alison Stewart
- John Stossel
- David Ushery
- Paula Zahn
