= Mohamed Keshavjee =

Canadian legal expert

Mohamed M. Keshavjee
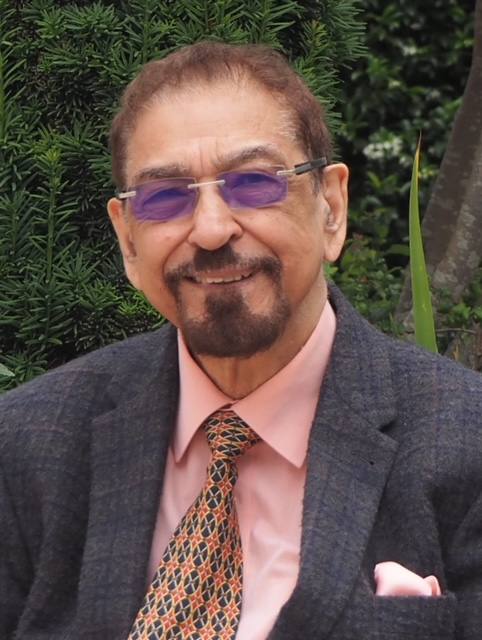
- Born: June 15, 1945 (age 81); Pretoria, South Africa
- Education: Honourable Society of Gray’s Inn London: LLB Queen's University Canada. Barrister at Law; PhD School of Oriental and African Studies, London University Faculty of Law.
- Years active: 1965–present
- Known for: Alternative Dispute Resolution (ADR), Contemporary Muslim Thought. Author, Historian
- Spouse: Amina Jindani (m. 1977)
- Relatives: Shaf Keshavjee, Ameer M Keshavjee, Ali Velshi

Mohamed Manjee Keshavjee is an international cross-cultural specialist on mediation, with a focus on Islamic Law and Alternative Dispute Resolution (ADR).

== Early life ==
Keshavjee was born in Pretoria, South Africa in 1945, to Indian parents, father Nazarali Manjee Keshavjee, and mother Koolsam Kanji Kana. Due to increasing political unrest and segregation in South Africa his family felt pressured to leave Pretoria for Kenya in 1962, searching for a better life. At first, conditions were better in Kenya, but that eventually changed with Idi Amin and, after returning to Kenya from England where he had obtained his law degree in 1969, Keshavjee found himself restricted from employment, even without pay. In 1972 his family then relocated to Canada. In his book, "Into That Heaven of Freedom" (with a foreword by Ahmed Kathrada, the second longest-serving political prisoner in the world after Nelson Mandela,) Keshavjee describes the history of Indian migration to Africa in the 19th century and their struggles under Apartheid, using his own family's story as a backdrop, highlighting the early racial struggle of Mohandas Gandhi years before he gained the honorific of Mahatma.

== Achievements ==
In 2016, Dr Keshavjee was awarded the Gandhi, King, Ikeda Peace Award by the Martin Luther King Jr. International Chapel at Morehouse College, Atlanta, Georgia, for his work on mediation, peace and human rights education. Keshavjee was the first Canadian and also the first Asian from Africa to be awarded this prize. At his acceptance of this prize, Keshavjee gave the speech, "Cosmopolitan Ethics: How we treat each other in today’s globalized world". He lectures on mediation methods needed in the face of major upheavals due to rapid globalization, accelerated technological growth, and massive climate change. His book, Islam, Sharia and Alternative Dispute Resolution, deals with how Muslims engage with sharia customary practices and the laws of the United Kingdom. He has spoken on ADR at conferences in Europe, North America and Asia, and has trained family mediators in the EU countries and imams and pastors in mosque and church conflicts in the UK and the US, respectively.

Dr Keshavjee has practised law in Kenya, Canada and the United Kingdom. He has spent three decades working with the secretariat of the Aga Khan in France on programs aimed at improving the quality of life of people in some of the poorest areas of the world through the Ismaili Imamat and the Aga Khan Development Network.

He has written books and articles on the Indian diaspora in Africa. In London, he helped to process the immigration files of East African Asians and has interviewed refugees from Uganda and other countries. In 2021, he was invited by the Pan African Bar Association of South Africa (PABASA) to train members of the judiciary in mediation with a team of some 20 trainers from six countries. Albie Sachs, the founding member of the Constitutional Court of South Africa opened the conference with a keynote presentation. In 2022, he led an international team to South Africa and was received by Ela Gandhi at the Phoenix settlement where Mahatma Gandhi started his first printing press in the 1890s.

In 2021, Dr. Keshavjee was appointed on the BUA 50 Steering Committee where he played an educational role in shaping the programme. This included a major programme with the National Archives of the U.K. He contributed an article on the Ugandan expulsion of 1972 to Awaaz publication of Kenya, which did a 50-year retrospect, conceptualised and moderated a programme for the Ismaili Tariqah and Religious Education Board capturing the Ismaili experience of the expulsion and resettlement, and presented a lecture in Durban South Africa highlighting the expulsion. This lecture was attended by both Ela Gandhi and Navanethem Pillay, former UN Commissioner for Human Rights.

In 2022, he spoke as a keynote with Albie Sachs as cameo at the ADRBC on the Truth and Reconciliation Commission on what Canada could do to make effective reparations to the indigenous people due to the residential schools' episode.

On November 15, 2022, he spoke on the Ugandan Expulsion of 1972 at Carleton University, Ottawa, Ontario, Canada.

== Education and training ==
1969 Honourable Society of Gray's Inn London: Barrister at Law; 1970 Admitted as Advocate of the High Court of Kenya in Nairobi; 1976 LLB from Queen's University, Kingston, Canada; 1977 Admitted as Barrister and Solicitor and Member of The Law Society of Upper Canada at Osgoode Hall, Toronto; 2000 LLM (honours) and 2009 PhD School of Oriental and African Studies, London University Faculty of Law: Thesis "Alternative Dispute Resolution in a Diasporic Muslim Community in the United Kingdom". Attended certification courses at The Hague Academy of Public International Law, Harvard Program in Mediation, Berghof Foundation in Berlin, and Child Focus in Belgium.

== Awards and honors ==
The Gandhi-King Award.

== Published works ==
- "Islam, Sharia and Alternative Dispute Resolution: Mechanisms for Legal Redress in the Muslim Community", published June 30, 2013, London, UK: IB Tauris & Co. ISBN 9780857722386
- "Into that Heaven of Freedom: The impact of apartheid on an Indian family's diasporic history", Mohamed M Keshavjee, 2015, by Mawenzi House Publishers, Ltd., Toronto, ON, Canada. ISBN 978-1-927494-27-1
- "Understanding Sharia: Islamic Law in a Globalised World", by Raficq S Abdulla and Mohamed M Keshavjee, published October 31, 2018, ISBN 9781788313193
- "Diasporic Distractions: New faces in new places", Kuala Lumpur, Silverfish Books, 2017, 212 p., ISBN 9789833221790
- "The Ugandan Expulsion at 50 and Beyond: A Time for Reflection", AWAAZ Voices, Vol 19, Issue 2, 2022.
- "Contemporary Trends in Sharia: Critical Debates in Historical Contexts", co-authored by Hadi Enayat and Mohamed Keshavjee ISBN 978-0755657940 Bloomsbury Academic, Oct. 29 2026

Contributed chapters to:

- "Dispute resolution", In A. Sajoo (Ed.), "A companion to Muslim ethics", London/New York: IB Tauris, Keshavjee, M. (2002)
- "Cross-border family mediation. In C. Paul & S. Kieswetter (Eds.), International parental child abduction, custody and access cases", Frankfurt: Wolfgang Metzner Verlag, Keshavjee, M. (2013)
- "Reflective learning from the training programmes of the Ismaili Muslim conciliation and arbitration boards globally", UK College of Mediators Journal (December), 23–8. Keshavjee, M., & Whatling, T. (2005). Available at http://www.iis.ac.uk/view_article.asp?
- "The State of Social Progress of Islamic Society; Social, Economic, Political, and Ideological Challenges", H. Tiliouine, R. J. Estes (Ed.). Springer. (2016). Available at https://link-springer-com.bris.idm.oclc.org/book/10.1007/978-3-319-24774-8.
- Co-authored "The Sharia; History, Ethics and Law", In A. Sajoo (Ed.), London: IB Tauris, Keshavjee, M and Abdulla, R (2018). Available at: https://www.bloomsbury.com/uk/sharia-9781786724045/
- "Comparative Dispute Resolution. In M. Moscati, M. Palmer, M. Roberts (Ed). London: Edward Elgar. (2020). Available at: https://www.e-elgar.com/shop/gbp/comparative-dispute-resolution-9781786433022.html

Book Reviews:

- "A Lawyer’s Odyssey: Apartheid, Mandela and Beyond", by Henry Brown (Otterley Press, Pietermaritzburg 2020), review By Mohamed M Keshavjee.
- "A Life of Ups and Downs: Population expulsions, state expropriation of private property, the mass movement of ethnic, tribal or religious groups, dispossession, enforced…" reviewer: Mohamed M Keshavjee, December 5, 2022, in AWAAZ.

== Personal life ==
In 1977, Keshavjee married Dr (now Professor) Amina Jindani in Toronto, Canada. Dr Jindani's life's work has been conducting clinical trials aimed at decreasing the length of time required to treat tuberculosis.
