= Jill Schary Robinson =

American novelist (1936–2024)

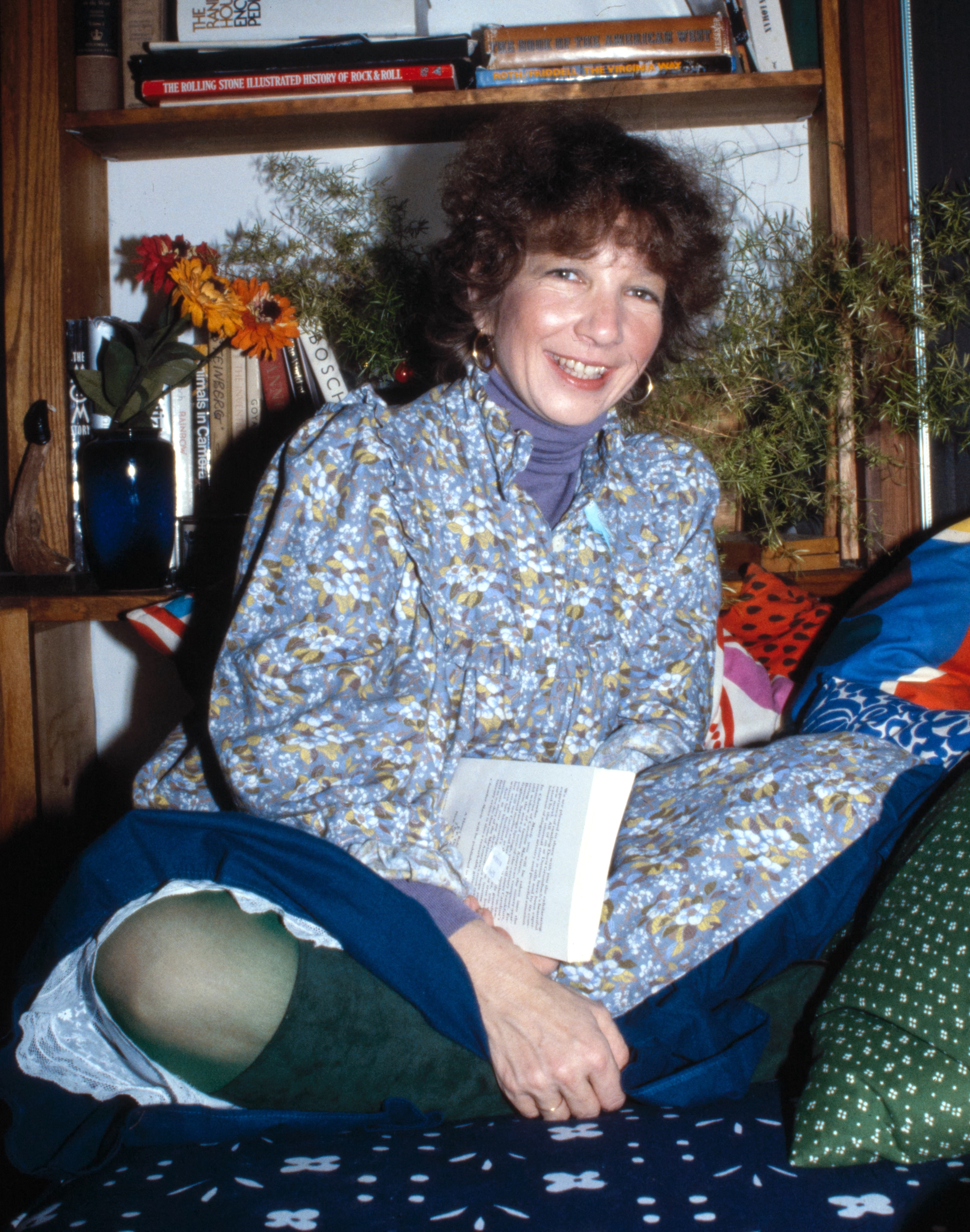
- Robinson in 1979
- Born: May 30, 1936; Los Angeles, California, U.S.
- Died: July 20, 2024 (aged 88); Beverly Hills, California, U.S.
- Occupations: Novelist; poet; essayist
- Spouses: Jon Courrier Zimmer (divorced); Jeremiah "Laurence" Robinson (divorced); Stuart Shaw
- Children: 2, including Jeremy Zimmer
- Parent: Dore Schary
- Writing career
- Period: 1963–2024
- Genres: Fiction, memoir
- Subjects: Social justice, feminism, Hollywood
- Notable works: With a Cast of Thousands; Perdido; Bed/Time/Story
- Website: jillscharyrobinson.com

Jill Schary Robinson (May 30, 1936 – July 20, 2024) was an American novelist, essayist, and teacher. Based in Los Angeles, her memoirs contended with the themes of addiction, recovery, and growing up during the golden age of Hollywood.

== Early life ==
Schary Robinson was born in Los Angeles on May 30, 1936, to a Jewish family, the daughter of Dore Schary, the Oscar and Tony Award-winning writer, producer, and head of MGM and Miriam Svet, a painter. In 1956, she married Jon Courrier Zimmer, then a lieutenant in the United States Naval Reserve, in a Jewish ceremony in Beverly Hills.

== Writing career ==
As a copywriter for the advertising agency FCB, Robinson trained with Helen Gurley Brown. Robinson also wrote on women's issues for Cosmopolitan and covered political trials for the SoHo Weekly News. Her first memoir, With a Cast of Thousands, is about her experiences growing up among celebrities such as Jane Fonda, Spencer Tracy, Elizabeth Taylor, and Adlai Stevenson. She also interviewed political and film personalities on KPFK and KLAC.

Robinson's 1974 acclaimed memoir about drug addiction, Bed/Time/Story, was turned into a television movie called A Cry For Love. She reviewed books and wrote articles for the New York Times, Los Angeles Times, Vanity Fair, Washington Post, and American and French Vogue.

During the 1980s, Robinson relocated to London and wrote a series of columns on being an American in Britain for London's Daily Telegraph. Her Vanity Fair story on Roman Polanski was included in George Plimpton’s book The Best American Movie Writing for 1998.

In 1999 author Jonathan Lethem described 1999's Past Forgetting as a "quietly moving memoir recounting that great rarity, a truly encompassing and persistent loss of memory." Robinson and her husband Stuart Shaw also performed on cruise ships, reading their play Falling in Love When You Thought You Were Through (adapted from their memoir, published in 2002).

In 2005, Robinson was given a lifetime grant to develop the non-profit Wimpole Street Writers program, which continues both in London and Los Angeles.

In 2009, she was instrumental in saving the Motion Picture and Television Fund's retirement home.

== Death ==
Robinson died at her home in Beverly Hills, California, on July 20, 2024, at the age of 88.

== Works ==
Robinson's major published works are:

- With a Cast of Thousands, 1963
- Thanks for the Rubies, Now Please Pass the Moon, 1972
- Bed/Time/Story, 1974
- Perdido, 1978
- Dr. Rocksinger and the Age of Longing, 1982
- Follow Me Through Paris, 1983
- Star Country, 1998
- Past Forgetting, 1999
- Falling in Love When you Thought You Were Through, 2002
