= Radio Television Digital News Association =

American association of news directors and executives

- Formerly: Radio-Television News Directors Association
- Industry: Journalism
- Founded: 1946
- Key people: Dan Shelley (President and CEO)
- Website: rtdna.org

The Radio Television Digital News Association (RTDNA) formerly the Radio-Television News Directors Association (RTNDA), is a United States-based membership organization of radio, television, and online news directors, producers, executives, reporters, students and educators. Among its functions are the maintenance of journalistic ethics and the preservation of the free speech rights of broadcast journalists.

Since 1971, RTDNA annually awards the Edward R. Murrow Award, recognizing excellence in electronic journalism, and the Paul White Award, presented annually since 1956 as its highest award, for lifetime achievement.

== History ==
The RTDNA was founded in 1946 as the National Association of Radio News Editors. The association was the idea of John Hogan, radio news editor at WCSH in Portland, Maine, who initially thought of it in the spring of that year. The name was changed at the first convention of the new organization, becoming the National Association of Radio News Directors (NARND). At this meeting, Hogan was elected president of the newly renamed group.

In 1952, the group's willingness to accept name changes proved useful when they renamed themselves the Radio-Television News Directors Association (RTNDA). This change reflected the importance of television and welcomed members from Canada, Mexico, and other countries by removing the word "national." More recently, in early 2010, they updated their name to include the word "digital" to highlight that industry's growing significance.

It was founded as an industry group to set standards for the nascent field of broadcast journalism and to defend the First Amendment in instances where broadcast media was being threatened.

Edward R. Murrow famously gave a speech at an RTNDA event held in his honor in 1958. The speech was harshly critical of the network television establishment of the day, and its emphasis on popular entertainment rather than news and public affairs programming. This speech was the cornerstone of the plot of the 2005 motion picture Good Night, and Good Luck.

== Awards ==
=== Reporting awards ===
Edward R. Murrow Awards

The Radio Television Digital News Association has been honoring outstanding achievements in electronic journalism with the Edward R. Murrow Awards since 1971. Murrow's pursuit of excellence in journalism embodies the spirit of the awards that carry his name. Murrow Award recipients demonstrate the excellence that Edward R. Murrow made a standard for the electronic news profession

Kaleidoscope Awards (formerly UNITY Awards)

RTDNA honors outstanding achievements in the coverage of diversity with the Kaleidoscope Awards The award was developed as part of RTDNA's commitment to achieve diversity in the newsroom through developing news content and editorial staffs that reflect the changing face of communities. The purpose of the award is to encourage and showcase journalistic excellence in covering issues of race, ethnicity, sexual orientation and gender identity. It is presented annually to news organizations that show an ongoing commitment to covering the diversity of the communities they serve.

NEFE Personal Finance Reporting Award

The Radio Television Digital News Association and the National Endowment for Financial Education work together to recognize excellence in personal finance reporting.

The award is presented as part of the Money Matters resource. Money Matters is a tool to help journalists better cover stories about financial issues on television, radio and online. One television, radio, and online journalist each receive a $1,000 prize and an invitation to present at the Excellence in Journalism conference.

Gannett Foundation Al Neuharth Award for Investigative Journalism

The Radio Television Digital News Association partners with the Gannett Foundation to honor the very best in investigative reporting. The award recognizes groundbreaking work by a journalist or a staff that creatively used digital tools in the role of being a community's watchdog. Special consideration is given to journalism that helps a community understand and address important issues. The winner receives a $5,000 prize awarded at the Excellence in Journalism conference.

=== Lifetime achievement awards ===
Paul White Award

Named for the first news director of CBS, the Paul White Award is RTDNA's highest honor and recognizes an individual's lifetime contributions to electronic journalism. The Paul White Award is presented annually at the Excellence in Journalism conference and exhibition.

- 2021 Susan Zirinsky
- 2020 Byron Pitts
- 2019 Scott Pelley
- 2018 Bill Whitaker
- 2016 Charlie Rose
- 2015 Lesley Stahl
- 2014 Dick Ebersol
- 2013 Chris Wallace
- 2012 Jeff Fager
- 2011 Linda Ellerbee
- 2010 Steve Kroft
- 2009 Fred Young
- 2008 Sam Donaldson and Tim Russert (posthumously)
- 2007 Christiane Amanpour
- 2006 Charles Gibson
- 2005 Charles Osgood
- 2004 Ted Koppel
- 2003 Bob Schieffer
- 2002 Tom Brokaw
- 2001 Jim McKay
- 2000 Ed Bradley
- 1999 Tom Johnson
- 1998 Jane Pauley
- 1997 Dan Rather
- 1996 Bernard Shaw
- 1995 Peter Jennings
- 1994 Charles Kuralt
- 1993 Ed Bliss
- 1992 Paul Harvey
- 1991 Mike Wallace
- 1990 Robert MacNeil and Jim Lehrer
- 1989 R.E. "Ted" Turner
- 1988 Douglas Edwards
- 1987 Don Hewitt
- 1986 Fred Friendly
- 1985 Barbara Walters
- 1984 Ralph Renick
- 1983 John Chancellor
- 1982 David Brinkley
- 1981 Walter Cronkite
- 1980 Pauline Frederick
- 1979 Dick Salant
- 1978 Bill Monroe
- 1977 Eric Sevareid
- 1976 Ted Koop
- 1975 Elmer Lower
- 1974 Bill Small
- 1973 Julian Goodman
- 1972 Sam Ervin
- 1971 Dr. Frank Stanton
- 1970 Walter Cronkite
- 1969 Judge Herbert B. Walker
- 1968 W. Theodore Pierson
- 1967 Sol Taishoff
- 1966 Morley Safer
- 1965 Ralph Blumberg
- 1964 Edward R. Murrow
- 1962 Howard K. Smith
- 1961 John F. Kennedy
- 1959 Jim Hagerty
- 1958 Robert D. Swezey
- 1957 Dr. Frank Stanton
- 1956 Hugh Terry

John F. Hogan Distinguished Service Award

Named for the founder and first president of RTNDA, the John F. Hogan Distinguished Service Award recognizes an individual's contributions to the journalism profession and freedom of the press. The award is presented annually at the Excellence in Journalism conference and exhibition.

- 2021 Soledad O'Brien
- 2020 Yamiche Alcindor
- 2019 John Quiñones
- 2018 Pete Williams
- 2017 Jake Tapper
- 2016 Jeffrey Marks
- 2015 Pierre Thomas
- 2014 Harvey Nagler
- 2013 Belva Davis
- 2012 Jorge Ramos
- 2011 Lara Logan
- 2010 Bob Priddy
- 2009 Barbara Cochran
- 2006 Christopher Glenn
- 2005 Don Fitzpatrick
- 2000 Stanley S. Hubbard, Jack Shelley
- 1999 Hugh Downs
- 1997 Walter Cronkite
- 1996 Sherlee Barish
- 1992 Terry Anderson
- 1991 Brian Lamb, Ed Godfrey, Bob Packwood, John Spain
- 1989 Gordon Manning, Dick Yoakum
- 1988 Vernon Stone
- 1987 Malvin Goode, J. Laurent Scharff
- 1986 Robert Byrd, Mark Fowler
- 1985 Ron Laidlaw
- 1984 Paul Davis
- 1983 Sig Mickelson
- 1981 Len Allen
- 1980 John Salisbury
- 1979 Rob Downey
- 1978 Col. Barney Oldfield
- 1974 Gordon Sinclair
- 1971 Charlie Edwards
- 1967 Ted Yates
- 1964 Robert Kintner
- 1962 David Sarnoff
- 1959 Frank Stanton

=== First Amendment Awards ===
The RTDNF First Amendment Awards honor individuals and organizations for their work on behalf of First Amendment freedom. They are presented annually at a gala in Washington, DC.

First Amendment Leadership Award

RTDNF presents this award annually to a business or government leader who has made a significant contribution to the protection of the First Amendment and freedom of the press.

- 2019 David Begnaud
- 2018 Gretchen Carlson
- 2017 Stanley S. Hubbard and Stanley E. Hubbard
- 2016 Rich Boehne
- 2015 Kathy Kirby
- 2014 David Lougee
- 2013 Robert Decherd
- 2012 Steve Capus
- 2011 David Barrett
- 2010 David Westin
- 2009 Google, Inc.
- 2008 Tom Curley
- 2007 Roger Ailes
- 2006 Hurricane Katrina Station Groups:
  - Belo Corp. (WWL-TV)
  - Clear Channel Broadcasting (WBUV-FM, WKNN-FM, WMJY-FM, WQYZ-FM, KHEV-FM, WNOE-FM, WODT-AM, WQUE-FM and WYLD-AM/FM)
  - Emmis Communications (WVUE-TV)
  - Entercom Communications (WWL-AM)
  - Hearst-Argyle Television, Inc. (WDSU-TV)
  - Liberty Corporation (WLOX-TV) and
  - Tribune Broadcasting (WGNO-TV)
- 2005 Jim Keelor
- 2004 Charles Grassley and Patrick Leahy
- 2003 Floyd Abrams
- 2002 Katharine Graham
- 2001 Don Hewitt
- 2000 R. E. "Ted" Turner
- 1999 Bob Wright
- 1998 Roone Arledge
- 1997 Robert L. Johnson
- 1996 Howard Stringer
- 1995 Tom Johnson
- 1994 James Quello
- 1993 Frank Stanton
- 1992 Allen Neuharth

Leonard Zeidenberg First Amendment Award

RTDNF presents this award annually to a radio or television journalist or news executive who has made a major contribution to the protection of First Amendment freedoms. It is named for the late Broadcasting & Cable senior correspondent, Leonard Zeidenberg.

- 2019 Shepard Smith
- 2018 Joe Scarborough & Mika Brzezinski
- 2017 Bill Whitaker
- 2016 Cami McCormick
- 2015 Ann Compton
- 2014 Lester Holt
- 2013 Candy Crowley
- 2012 Martha Raddatz
- 2011 Wolf Blitzer
- 2010 Brian Williams
- 2009 Cokie Roberts
- 2008 Bob Schieffer
- 2007 Bob Woodruff and Kimberly Dozier
- 2006 Gwen Ifill
- 2005 Ed Bradley
- 2004 Andrea Mitchell
- 2003 Judy Woodruff
- 2002 Sam Donaldson
- 2001 Jim Lehrer
- 2000 Diane Sawyer
- 1999 Christiane Amanpour
- 1998 Mike Wallace
- 1997 Jane Pauley
- 1996 Carole Simpson
- 1995 Walter Cronkite
- 1994 David Brinkley
- 1993 John Chancellor
- 1992 James Snyder

First Amendment Service Award This award honors professionals in local or network news who work in an off-air, management, largely behind-the-scenes capacity.

- 2019 James Goldston
- 2018 David Rhodes
- 2017 Steve Jones
- 2016 Robert Garcia
- 2015 Perry Sook
- 2014 Robin Sproul
- 2013 Lloyd Siegel
- 2012 Marci Burdick
- 2011 Susana Schuler
- 2010 Harvey Nagler
- 2009 Susan Grant
- 2008 Paula Madison
- 2007 Philip Balboni
- 2006 William Wheatley
- 2005 Wendy Walker Whitworth
- 2004 Walter Ulloa
- 2003 Susan Zirinsky
- 2002 Fred Young
- 2001 Gary Wordlaw
- 2000 Lee Giles
- 1999 Marty Haag
- 1998 Betty Cole Dukert

First Amendment Award This award honors an outstanding individual or organization which champions the First Amendment and press freedoms.

- 2019 CNN
- 2018 Meet the Press
- 2017 Mark Halperin and John Heilemann
- 2016 Jason Rezaian
- 2015 James Risen
- 2014 The Associated Press
- 2013 Twitter
- 2012 Jim Bohannon
- 2010 Barbara Cochran & Marcellus Alexander
- 2009 John S. and James L. Knight Foundation
- 2008 Richard Wiley

First Amendment Clarity Award This award recognizes a journalist or group of journalists who go to extraordinary lengths to provide meaning and context to complicated news stories or issues of extreme public importance.

- 2019 NBC News/MSNBC 2019 “Road Warriors

First Amendment Defender Award This award is presented to an individual or organization who takes a public stand in support of press freedom.

- 2019 Senator Amy Klobuchar
- 2018 Congressman Eric Swalwell
- 2016 Tim Tai

RTDNF Citation of Courage This award is presented in recognition of distinguished service to journalism and extraordinary courage.

- 2019 Jamal Khashoggi
- 2019 Journalists of the Capital Gazette
- 2015 James Foley
- 2015 Steven Sotloff

RTDNF Lifetime Achievement Award

- 2019 Dale Hansen
- 2018 Robin Roberts
- 2017 Nina Totenberg
- 2016 Tom Brokaw
- 2015 Bob Simon
- 2014 Bill Plante
- 2012 Andy Rooney

=== Internal awards ===
Barney Oldfield Distinguished Service Award

The Barney Oldfield Distinguished Service Award was created in honor of RTDNF founder Col. Barney Oldfield, USAF (Ret.), and goes annually to an individual who, through their own efforts, has contributed to the growth and success of RTDNF.

Bob Priddy Award

Bob Priddy, one of RTDNA's most distinguished board members over 27 years of service stepped down in 2010. At RTDNA@NAB 2010, Priddy was honored with the newly introduced Bob Priddy award, which is now presented annually to board members who exemplify Priddy's distinguished and consistent service to RTDNA

Rob Downey Citation

The Rob Downey Citation is presented annually at RTDNA's International Conference and Exhibition. Named for the first executive secretary of RTDNA, the Rob Downey Citation recognizes exceptional service to the RTDNA board of directors.

== Code of ethics ==
The RTDNA Code of Ethics does not dictate what journalists should do in every ethical predicament; rather it offers resources to help journalists make better ethical decisions – on and off the job – for themselves and for the communities they serve.

The Code's guiding principles are truth and accuracy above all, independence and transparency, and accountability for consequences.

The RTDNA Code of ethics was most recently revised June 11, 2015.

Coverage guidelines

RTDNA has also developed a series of coverage guidelines to assist journalists, newsroom managers and station management with both common and uncommon ethical and operational situations which may arise. The guidelines have been prepared by journalists, managers and subject-area experts, and have been vetted by the RTDNA Ethics Committee.

== Training ==
The RTDNA and the Radio Television Digital News Foundation offer training opportunities to broadcast and digital journalists and students as well as to newsroom managers through resources including:

- Leadership Guides
- Crisis Planning Guides
- The Diversity Toolkit
- Ed Talks
- Periodic webinars
- Expert articles in the Daily Communicator e-newsletter
- Annual Excellence in Journalism conference

== Journalism scholarships and fellowships ==
RTDNA's educational and philanthropic arm, the Radio Television Digital News Foundation, recognizes outstanding students and young professionals pursuing careers in electronic journalism with a number of scholarships and fellowships offered each year.

Scholarships for Graduate and Undergraduate Students:

- The Ed Bradley Scholarship
- The Carole Simpson Scholarship
- The Pete Wilson (broadcaster) Scholarship for students from the Bay Area
- The Lee Thornton Scholarship (preference given to Howard University and University of Maryland students.
- The Presidents Scholarship in recognition of past RTDNA Presidents
- The Lou and Carole Prato Sports Reporting Scholarship
- The George Foreman Tribute to Lyndon B. Johnson Scholarship for students at the University of Texas at Austin
- The Mike Reynolds Scholarship
- The Abe Schechter Scholarship for graduate students (fund now retired)

Fellowships for Young Professionals (with fewer than 10 years as a professional journalist):

- The N.S. Bienstock Fellowship
- The Michele Clark Fellowship
- The Vadna and Colonel Barney Oldfield National Security Reporting Fellowship
- The Jacque I. Minnotte Health Reporting Fellowship
