= Consider This (talk show) =

2013–2015 American TV series

- Genre: Current affairs talk show
- Presented by: Antonio Mora
- Country of origin: United States

Production
- Production location: New York City
- Running time: 1 hour

Original release
- Network: Al Jazeera America
- Release: August 20, 2013 – February 2015

Consider This is an American weeknight current affairs television talk show hosted by Antonio Mora that was broadcast on Al Jazeera America. The program aired from August 2013 to February 2015, and featured interviews and panel discussions on the stories of the day. Consider This also featured interactive segments where the audience joins the conversation via social media. The show was produced and shot from New York City and was produced from the same studio as Real Money with Ali Velshi, another show on Al Jazeera America. Consider This airs from 10pm to 11pm eastern time, Monday through Friday. There were repeats in the morning and on weekends.

The show also took questions from social media. That part of the show was hosted by Hermela Aregawi.

== History ==
On July 26, 2013, the network announced that former Good Morning America host and award-winning journalist Antonio Mora would host a current events talk show called Consider This that would launch on August 20, 2013. The first episode of the show highlighted the hunger strike and court-approved force-feeding in California's prison system. Other episodes have highlighted issues such as the U.S. education system, sexual assault on college campuses, foreign issues, Native American issues, LGBT issues, poverty, the government, science, and investigative reports. Notable guests have included former president Jimmy Carter and racing legend Jackie Stewart among others. The show absorbed much of the former Current TV staff based in New York City that had been part of the show Viewpoint.

The show was cancelled on February 2, 2015, after a reorganization of Al Jazeera America's programming schedule.

It was later replaced by the weekly program Third Rail.
