= Ed Godfrey =

American television journalist (1931–2019)

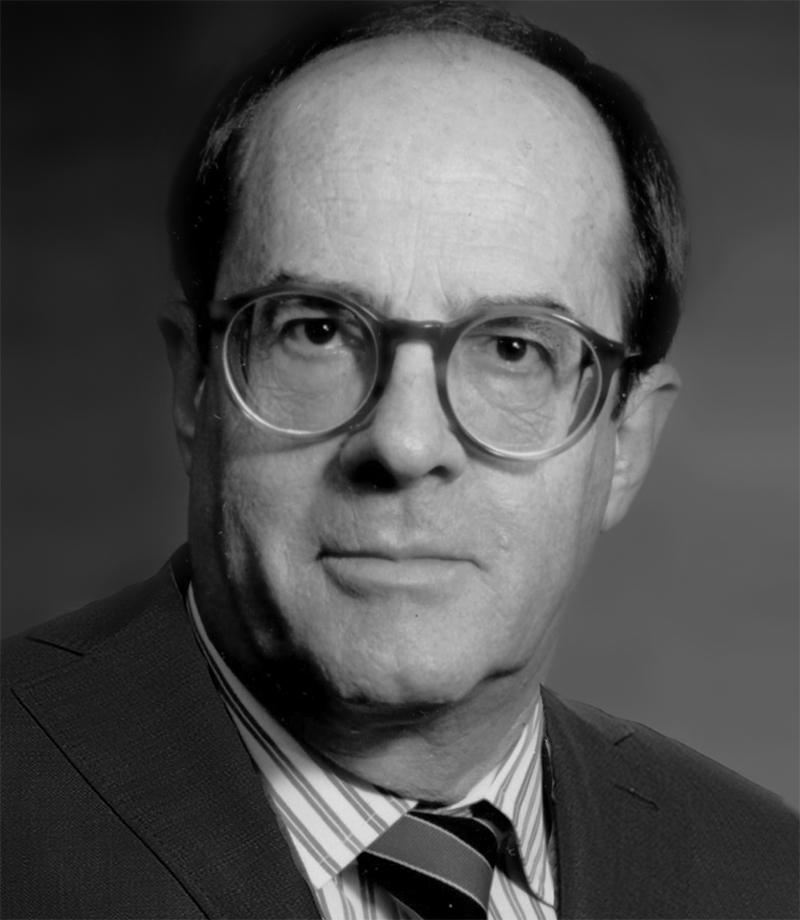
- Born: Milton Edwin Godfrey Jr. February 4, 1931; Titusville, Pennsylvania, U.S.
- Died: June 18, 2019 (aged 88); Louisville, Kentucky
- Occupations: Broadcast television journalist, news director, news producer, news photographer

Milton Edwin "Ed" Godfrey Jr. (February 4, 1931 – June 18, 2019) was an American television journalist, an innovative, award-winning, multi-market television news producer and news director who also served as a director-at-large and president of the Radio Television News Director Association. Godfrey's achievements included pioneering Evening in 1975, the nation's first broadcast early evening news magazine show. He also lead the broadcast news industry's successful effort to abolish the Fairness Doctrine that hampered the broadcast media.

== Biography ==
Godfrey was born in Titusville, Pennsylvania on February 4, 1931, the second of Col. (US) Milton Edwin Godfrey Sr. and Grace (née Wilson) Godfrey's three children. He had moved with his military family nearly 20 times by the time he graduated from high school. Godfrey married Regina Suzanne "Sue" Pocalka in 1957 while attending college in Baltimore, Maryland. He began his career in broadcasting in 1959, joining Miami, Florida's WTVJ television station as a photographer. Godfrey continued moving up in broadcast news, becoming an award-winning, innovative broadcast news producer and news director in multiple markets. He was elected president of the RTNDA, an industry advocacy group founded to set standards for broadcast journalism and to defend the First Amendment in instances where broadcast media was being threatened. Godfrey testified in that capacity before the United States Congress on three separate occasions. After suffering a debilitating fall, Godfrey died on June 18, 2019, in Louisville, Kentucky.

== Education ==
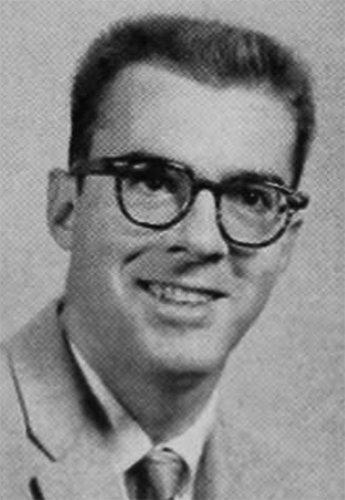
Milton Edwin Godfrey Jr. 1958 - University of Maryland, College Park Yearbook

Godfrey graduated from Harrisburg High School, in Harrisburg, Pennsylvania. Initially attending Pennsylvania State University, Godfrey was called to duty during the Korean War, and served for 2 1/2 years as an office administrator stationed in Japan. Returning after the war, Godfrey earned degrees in Journalism and Public Relations from the University of Maryland, College Park in 1958.

== Broadcast news career ==
Godfrey's 41-year journalism career saw him steadily rise through the ranks, starting as a film news photographer, then becoming a news producer, and finally a news director. He maintained a lifelong commitment to integrity in journalism. A staunch defender of the First Amendment, he also showed compassion for victims experiencing tragic loss and pain. Godfrey discouraged reporters from seeking quick sound bites from victims.

== WTVJ, Miami, Florida ==
Ralph Renick hired Godfrey in 1959 as a news film photographer at Miami, Florida's WTVJ "Channel 4" television station. The station was known for its groundbreaking, award-winning documentaries and other long-form news coverage at a time when only national broadcast networks were producing such fare. Godfrey said in 1982 "Ralph Renick set the standard for local TV news nationally".

On June 29, 1961, WTVJ aired A Cry in the Dark, a documentary that explored aspects of mental illness on WTVJ's FYI evening newscast. Godfrey was one of two photographers who filmed documentary segments in the mental care wards of Florida State Hospital in Chattahoochee and the Hollywood Memorial Hospital in Hollywood, Florida. The segments included an open brain operation, therapists and psychologists at work with their patients as well as interviews of patients being admitted, patients being readied for release and an interview of a Cape Canaveral housewife "who tried to sell religion to NASA on the day they fired Alan Shepard into space". This was the first time news cameras had been allowed inside Florida mental hospitals, having been granted permission by then Governor Farris Bryant.

Godfrey became the executive producer of WTVJ's Newsnight, a daily, half-hour 7:00 pm news show. He resigned from the station in July, 1965.

== KHOU, Houston, Texas ==
Godfrey joined KHOU as Assistant News Director in August, 1965. He was promoted to News Director two years later. Station manager James Richdale said of Godfrey "From the day he came to work, he has proven himself to be a capable administrator, completely involved in the News Department and Station, and has time and again demonstrated the keenest judgement on vital news matters".

=== 30 Minutes news magazine show ===
Godfrey created the 30 Minutes news magazine show at KHOU and served as the show's producer. The emphasis was on news, not infotainment.

In 1969, the fifth episode was an in-depth look at the financial difficulties that had forced the Houston Independent School District to end kindergarten classes. The episode also featured a look at the "Moon Lab" at the University of Houston which had been set up to study lunar samples from the Moon's surface that were scheduled to arrive later that July.

The seventh episode featured film footage of the 1900 Galveston hurricane produced by Thomas Edison and suggested the 8,000 dead (at that time the worst natural disaster in America) might be overshadowed by the then current drought in Houston. The episode asked if drought would become a recurrent problem for Houston residents.

An end-of-the-year episode which aired on December 23, 1969, featured 30 Minutes host Ron Stone showcasing "the most meaningful events" in Houston's history, then "the US south's largest city". The episode featured an interview with CBS News' Walter Cronkite who pointed out what he felt "was the most significant single happening during the 'Sixties". According to Godfrey, "a great amount of archive Channel 11 (KHOU) film will be used in... this decade-ending program". Other episodes addressed topical issues of the day, including Houston's then current teen drug abuse and Houston's substandard housing.

=== Houston news documentaries ===
Among the documentaries Godfrey produced at KHOU, he managed the six-month long creation of A Right To Life, a two-part, three hour documentary that investigated the efficacy of drugs that had not been cleared by the FDA for the treatment of conditions such as cancer, diabetic retinopathy, allergies and others.

One drug examined was Dimethyl Sulfoxide (DMSO) along with its promoter Dr. Stanley Jacob. KHOU's documentary predated CBS News' 60 Minutes investigation of DMSO by ten years.

The documentary, written by reporter Ron Stone earned a 52 share of the evening Houston television viewing audience and praise from local media. The Houston Chronicle said the program was "made by and for Houstonians, but its appeal should be national... I guarantee you'll be fascinated". The Houston Post said "A hard-hitting piece of video journalism. A big-time, professional look". US Senator Ralph Yarborough subsequently appeared on KHOU's news programs, praised the producers and promised his US Senate Subcommittee on Health would hold hearings to probe drug licensing procedures.

== KGW, Portland, Oregon ==
In 1971 Godfrey was hired as News Manager of KGW, then King Broadcasting's Portland, Oregon television station.

=== Evening news magazine show ===
In 1975, Godfrey managed the creation and introduction of KGW's Evening, the nation's first broadcast news magazine show. Evening, broadcast Monday through Friday at 7:00 pm, premiered September 1, 1975, a year before Westinghouse Broadcasting's KPIX premiered their Evening Magazine and six years before the similar Entertainment Tonight news program. Godfrey's team included show producer Michael Sullivan. Sullivan said he had been encouraged to move up from his position of "lowly floor director at the CBS affiliate... I quickly apprenticed myself to the best news photographer in the shop, recording sound for his documentaries, assisting him through the all night edit sessions, soaking up the craft".

KGW's Evening episodes were broadcast every weekday on all four King Broadcasting Company stations. Godfrey's Evening magazine news show concept was copied a year later and successfully syndicated across America by Westinghouse Broadcasting".

== WSB, Atlanta, Georgia ==
Godfrey left KGW in 1977 and was hired as News Director at WSB in Atlanta, the fourth news director hired by the station in three years. Staff morale was low. A WSB spokesperson reported Godfrey was "being brought here to end the 'happy talk'" between news anchors during WSB's news programs. Godfrey quickly announced changes in the structure and pace of the station's newscast, saying "The newscasts will have a little different look, but as far as changes in faces, there will be none".

Godfrey's first task was to redesign the station's aging newsroom. At the time, most WSB reporters had to share desks and typewriters. Godfrey also pressed to upgrade the news gathering equipment. The station had yet to replace aging, first-generation ENG cameras and editing equipment. Godfrey also immediately had his office renovated in his singular glass-walled style, the design symbolizing his philosophy of open management, saying "...I'm not close-minded".

By 1979, Godfrey had realigned WSB newscasts to feature Atlanta area "neighborhood news". "My major emphasis is covering the community... I'm trying to get away from the institutional news that I think is predominant, not just in this market, but in a lot of the markets in the country". Godfrey said "We're covering the news better, we're covering it differently, and we're covering more of it". WSB had regained its solid footing in news viewership ratings.

In 1979, When the Atlanta Constitution asked it's readers for their opinions on local television, many complained about the then ubiquitous hour-long local evening newscasts in Atlanta. Godfrey's answer: "When you have to look around to fill up that hour, sometimes you come up with very worthwhile things".

=== Fired in a "house cleaning" ===
Godfrey was fired from WSB on June 27, 1980, part of a "house cleaning" that included the firing of the station's general manager, general sales manager, promotion director and production manager. Commenting on Godfrey's firing, WSB newsroom staff members said "...everyone had come to respect Ed as a News Director" and "This is a rotten way to pay off somebody who has accomplished what Ed has accomplished".

=== Won "Television News Excellence" Emmy award ===
The next evening after having been fired, Godfrey was awarded a regional Emmy Award for "Television News Excellence", one of twelve Emmy awards won that year by the WSB newsroom operation he had headed. At the awards ceremony, WSB reporters, producers and news anchors "all made a point of thanking Godfrey, a man who would never say anything on his own behalf". Accepting his award, Godfrey sad nothing about his departure, instead he "thanked his engineers".

== WAVE, Louisville, Kentucky ==
Godfrey was hired as news director at WAVE TV in Louisville in 1980 and remained at that station until his retirement in 2000. When the station renovated its news department, Godfrey once again had a glass-walled office installed for his use within the newsroom.

At the 1982 Society of Professional Journalists, Sigma Delta Chi annual convention, Godfrey predicted "greater localization of newscasts in the future" and complained about the additional costs of then new satellite uplink dishes, saying he was using his "because he's been told to, but he thinks the cost should be charged to programming instead of news, because it's mostly used as a programming tool".

While WAVE news director, Godfrey was elected and served as RTNDA president in 1983 and 1984.

=== FirstNews ===
In 1990, Godfrey developed FirstNews, then the earliest afternoon newscast in Louisville. Premiering in May, the half-hour show aired at 5:00 pm and featured WAVE news anchor Jackie Hays. Hays had recently joined WAVE TV, returning to the Louisville market from Philadelphia, Pennsylvania's KYW-TV. Hays had been a popular news anchor at Louisville's WHAS TV in the 1970s.

The Louisville Courier-Journal TV critic Tom Dorsey said "Reaction to FirstNews, even from competitors, has been laudatory. The move was a bold and decisive effort to re-establish WAVE's news image in the face of some recent ratings reversals. It caught WAVE's competitors looking the other way...".

=== Assistant to General Manager ===
In 1993, Godfrey was named Assistant to the General Manager, a position he held until his retirement in 2000.

In 1996, Godfrey was one of "28 early career broadcast journalists" who presented discussions during the Taishoff Broadcasting Seminar. The seminars were aimed at identifying new issues facing broadcasters. Godfrey was chosen by his peer fellows after being nominated by leaders of the Society of Professional Journalists based on "his past achievements in the broadcast field".

== Testimony before US Congress as news director ==
External videos
- Remarks by Ed Godfrey, News Director, WAVE TV, during Senate Commerce Committee, July 20, 1987

Godfrey's opinion was sought by the US Congress on a number of matters. Godfrey testified before the United States Senate Committee on Rules and Administration on September 18, 1985, in support of televising US Senate sessions.

On July 20, 1987, Godfrey testified before the United States Senate Committee on Commerce, Science, and Transportation regarding the Broadcasting Improvements Act of 1987, commenting specifically on the standards for licensees and increasing minority ownership of broadcast stations.

== Radio Television News Directors Association service ==
=== Director-at-large ===
The Radio Television News Directors Association (RTNDA) is often referred to as "the national voice for electronic journalists". Godfrey was elected to two two-year terms as a director-at-large of the RTNDA, first in 1978 and then in 1980. In 1979, Godfrey was elected to the Executive Committee of the RTNDA for a one-year term.

=== Elected president ===
Godfrey was elected president of the RTNDA in 1982 and served through 1984. He was the only candidate recommended by the nominating committee.

RTNDA treasurer Lou Prato said of Godfrey "He was one of the most effective presidents we’ve ever had". During his tenure, Godfrey attempted to advance the organization's agenda and its goals. He made an effort to abolish the Fairness Doctrine.

Godfrey testified before the US Congress three times during his tenure. Larry Scharff, RTNDA's general counsel for many years, said of Godfrey "I can tell you that (Ed) was devoted to RTDNA and its great causes of the First Amendment and the betterment of electronic journalism. He served RTNDA well for many years before and after his presidency".

=== Protested President Reagan's ban on Grenada news coverage ===
In 1983, the Reagan Administration banned media coverage of the United States invasion of Grenada. The decision was made by Secretary of Defense Caspar Weinberger, who explained "the ban was imposed because the safety of journalists could not be guaranteed".

Godfrey protested "vigorously" to Reagan on behalf of RTNDA's 2,000 association members. Godfrey described the administration's policy banning coverage of the Grenada situation as one of "secrecy and censorship" and said "even if we were to accept the arguments for secrecy before the invasion, I can find no acceptable reasons for continuing these policies more than two days after the event. Journalist safety is not an acceptable excuse. Reporters have been allowed to cover far more dangerous military actions in Vietnam, El Salvador and Lebanon".

=== Testimony to US Congress regarding abolishing the Fairness Doctrine ===
External videos
- Remarks by RTNDA President Ed Godfrey during Senate Commerce Committee, February 8, 1984

As RTNDA President, Godfrey testified before the Senate Commerce Committee and then-Chairman Robert Packwood on Feb. 8, 1984, in support of S.B. 1917, which sought to abolish the Fairness Doctrine, a policy that required the holders of broadcast licenses both to present controversial issues of public importance and to do so in a manner that was honest, equitable, and balanced. He told the Senate Commerce Committee in 1984, "We news directors are determined to end our second-class citizenship under the First Amendment. The Communications Act requires government regulation of the journalistic content of electronic media in ways clearly forbidden for regulation of print media content. The public we serve is ultimately the loser... The First Amendment and its interpretation by the Supreme Court should be our shield from government intrusion".

=== Testimony to US Congress regarding the impact of media coverage of rape trials ===
On April 24, 1984, Godfrey testified during a US Senate Subcommittee investigating the impact of media coverage of rape trials. Godfrey represented the views of the RTNDA, advocating for a change in the law which would allow electronic media the same access as the print media had in covering courtroom testimony during rape trials.

Godfrey said that, although the media do not usually disclose rape victims' names, privacy interests of witnesses and jurors are generally secondary to the constitutional right to a fair and public trial. "If cameras had not been present in the Massachusetts trial, the case would still have received extensive but indirect and less reliable coverage in newspapers, magazines and newscasts". Godfrey continued, saying that 30 states allowed radio and television access to criminal trials so that "we no longer have to rely on sketches and what the reporters thought they heard".

In a summary letter addressed to Subcommittee Chair Arlen Specter, Godfrey said "Trials will be covered by the electronic media with or without cameras and microphones inside the courtroom, The length of such coverage will be determined by the news value of what happened that day. The only difference is how the report is presented. Once guidelines have been agreed upon concerning the placement of the equipment and its operation, the courts cannot and should not try to apply any controls over electronic news coverage that do not also apply to print coverage. As Chief Justice Warren Burger has written, 'For better or worse, editing is what editors are for; and editing is selection and choice of material. The only question is what will be available for the electronic media to edit?'".

=== Championed RTNDA reorganization ===
In 1986, Godfrey advocated for and lead the process of hiring the RTNDA's first full-time president. Asked why, Godfrey, who had served four years in the post said "We wanted to develop a higher image in Washington, and, under our constitution and bylaws, the only person who can speak for the organization is the president, who is a full-time president. The last three of us (appointed presidents) found that, with all of the travel involved, this was like having two full-time jobs".

== People hired or promoted by Godfrey ==
Godfrey had the ability to spot talent early in a job applicant's career. Among the many he hired over four decades include the following:

Allison Bell – Professor, Ivy Tech Community College in Muncie, Indiana
Godfrey hired her as a WAVE News stand-up reporter. Bell then co-hosted the WAVE 3 Sunrise morning show. Remembering Godfrey, Bell said, "I wouldn't have ended up in Louisville without his faith in my work and his gruff, marine-style, professional critiques and support!".

Linda Broadus – former corporate spokesperson for Toyota Motor Manufacturing Kentucky.
Broadus was a newsroom researcher for WAVE News' investigative reports. Godfrey later promoted her to Noon and evening news producer at WAVE. "I like to promote from within", Godfrey said. "I looked around and thought she might do all right". After WAVE TV, Broadus worked for Humana, was an aide to Senator Mitch McConnell and an aide to Kentucky Governor Steve Beshear.

Robin Chapman – news anchor, reporter, author, historian
Godfrey hired Chapman at KGW as a reporter in 1974. Chapman was promoted to weekend anchor, co-anchor and anchor of the Evening nightly feature news program in Portland, Oregon. Chapman worked at the NBC-TV station in San Francisco, and later moved on to WJLA-TV, the ABC affiliate in Washington, D.C. She later worked as national correspondent for Group W TV. Chapman is also the author of five books.

Greg Donaldson – currently Senior Vice President of Corporate and Marketing Communications for the American Heart Association.
Godfrey hired Donaldson as a political beat reporter at WAVE TV.

Patricia Joy – first woman to join the National Press Photographers Association.
Godfrey hired Joy as a news photographer at KGW. Joy was later Director of Radio Programming, Oregon Public Broadcasting.

John Lansing – American journalist and broadcaster, former president and CEO of National Public Radio. Earlier in his career, Lansing had served as the first chief executive officer and Director of the U.S. Agency for Global Media, President of Scripps Networks and President and chief executive officer of Cable & Telecommunications Association for Marketing.
In 1980, Godfrey hired Lansing as WAVE TV's chief news photographer. Godfrey later named Lansing managing editor.

Ron Regan – NewsChannel 5's chief investigative reporter in Cleveland, Ohio.
In 2011, Regan received the George Foster Peabody Award for Excellence after uncovering the link between radiation exposure and cancer among veterans.

Michael Sullivan – Broadcast journalist and Executive Producer of Special Projects, PBS' FRONTLINE.
One of Godfrey's news and documentary cameramen at KGW-TV, Sullivan moved on to Minneapolis' WCCO-TV as executive producer of WCCO's investigative I-Team and co-produced four FRONTLINE projects before joining the series. Sullivan earned dozens of national awards including Alfred I. duPont–Columbia University Awards, Emmy Awards and Peabody Awards.

Nel Taylor – Chief Communication Officer, ResCare
Godfrey hired Taylor as WAVE TV's investigative reporter. She was known on-air as the WAVE 3 News TroubleShooter for over 12 years.

Kirstie Wilde – former television news reporter and anchor
Godfrey hired her as the first female floor director at KGW. Her broadcasting history: KGW-TV, Portland; KCST-TV, San Diego; KGTV-TV, San Diego; KRON-TV, San Francisco; WHAS-TV, Louisville; KNBC-TV, Los Angeles; KTTV-TV, Los Angeles; KCBA-TV, Monterey/Salinas.

== Awards ==
1991 – RTNDA John F. Hogan Distinguished Service Award - "for contributions to the journalism profession and freedom of the press".

1986 – RTNDA Rob Downey Citation - "recognizing exceptional service to the RTNDA board of directors".

1980 – National Academy of Television Arts and Sciences, Atlanta Chapter, Regional "Emmy" Award, Outstanding Achievement: Television News Excellence.

== Death ==
Godfrey died, aged 88 on June 18, 2019, in Louisville, Kentucky after suffering complications from a fall earlier that year.

Godfrey's memorial service was held Sunday, June 30, 2019, at St. Luke's Episcopal Church in Anchorage, Kentucky.
