= Bulletin (service) =

American online newsletter platform owned by Facebook

- Website type: Newsletter service Publisher
- Founded: June 29, 2021; 5 years ago in Menlo Park, California
- Founder: Mark Zuckerberg
- CEO: Mark Zuckerberg
- Parent: Meta Platforms, Inc.
- Website: www.bulletin.com
- Launched: July 6, 2021; 5 years ago
- Current status: Inactive

Bulletin was an online newsletter platform launched by Facebook on July 6, 2021, that allows notable writers to make announcements directly to their subscribers. Its competitors included Substack, of which Bulletin was called a "near-clone." Writers participating in the platform's launch included Malcolm Gladwell, Mitch Albom, Tan France, Jessica Yellin, Jane Wells, Erin Andrews and Dorie Greenspan. Facebook CEO Mark Zuckerberg stated that Bulletin represented the first time that the company had "built a project that is directly for journalists and individual writers."

In October 2022 Meta announced the shutdown of Bulletin. The platform went into read only mode in January 2023 and became unavailable in April 2023.

== History ==
Facebook announced Bulletin as its online newsletter platform on June 29, 2021. and launched by the company on July 6, 2021. Facebook CEO Mark Zuckerberg touted the service by saying that Bulletin represented the first time that the company had "built a project that is directly for journalists and individual writers." Writers participating in the platform's launch included Malcolm Gladwell, Mitch Albom, Tan France, Jessica Yellin, Jane Wells, Erin Andrews and Dorie Greenspan.

== Reception ==
Unlike competitor such as Substack, Facebook indicated upon service's launch that it would not take a cut of subscription fees of writers using that platform. According to Washington Post technology writer Will Oremus, the move was criticized by those who viewed it as a form of predatory pricing intended by Facebook to force those competitors out of business. Sandeep Vaheesan, legal director of the think tank Open Markets, called for the government to reexamine predatory pricing as a violation of antitrust law, saying, "We want companies to compete by making better products, investing in new equipment and tech — not purely relying on their financial advantages to capture market share."
