= Jeffrey W. Ubben =

American businessman

- Born: Jeffrey Williams Ubben; 1961 or 1962 (age 63–64)
- Education: Duke University; Kellogg School of Management
- Occupation: Businessman

Jeffrey Williams Ubben (born 19 July 1961, Illinois) is an American businessman. He is the co-founder of ValueAct Capital, a hedge fund based in San Francisco, California.

== Early life ==
Jeffrey W. Ubben graduated from Duke University. He received a master of business administration from the Kellogg School of Management at Northwestern University in 1987.

== Business career ==
Ubben managed the Fidelity Value Fund at Fidelity Investments for eight years. From 1995 to 2000 he was the Managing Partner of Blum Capital .

In 2000 he became the co-founder of ValueAct Capital, a hedge fund based in San Francisco, California.

In August 2015, Ubben acquired a minority stake in the United Talent Agency. He left ValueAct Capital in 2020 to pursue social investing.

== Board memberships ==
Ubben has served on a number of boards, including Northwestern University, ExxonMobil, 21st Century Fox, Sara Lee Corporation, Nikola Corporation, Vistry Group, the World Wildlife Fund, the Posse Foundation, the American Conservatory Theater and the E.O. Wilson Biodiversity Foundation.

== Charity ==
In September, 2019, it was announced that Jeff Ubben and his wife Laurie "have made an estate commitment of $50 million to support scholarships for undergraduate, graduate and professional school students" at Northwestern University, the largest donation towards financial aid in the university's history.
