= David M. Kramer (biophysicist) =

American biophysicist

David Mark Kramer (born 1961) is an American biophysicist.

Kramer earned a Bachelor of Science degree at the University of Dayton in biology, then completed a master's of science in cell biology at the same institution. In 1990, Kramer completed a doctorate in biophysics at the University of Illinois. He is the Hannah Distinguished Professor in Photosynthesis and Bioenergetics at Michigan State University.
