= Ti-Hua Chang =

American broadcast journalist and reporter

- Education: University of Pennsylvania, Columbia University Graduate School of Journalism
- Occupations: Journalist, news producer

Ti-Hua Chang (born New York City) is a Chinese American broadcast journalist based in New York City since 1989. He was the climate change investigative reporter for TYT Investigates.

He has been an investigative reporter for numerous news outlets in the New York City region and at the national level. He has been a freelance correspondent for CBS Evening News. In 2008, he joined WWOR/MY9 as a general assignment reporter. A year later, he served as a general assignment and investigative reporter for WNYW, the FOX affiliate in New York. Before joining WCBS in 2005, Chang worked as a general assignment/investigative TV reporter at WNBC-TV. Prior to that, he was the host of his own talk show, New York Hotline on WNYC-TV. Chang also worked as an investigative producer at ABC News and as a reporter at WLOX in Biloxi, Mississippi, KYW-TV in Philadelphia, KUSA in Denver and WJBK in Detroit.

Chang is a native New Yorker, and grew up on the Upper West Side. He has a bachelor's degree from the University of Pennsylvania and a Master's degree from the Columbia University Graduate School of Journalism (1977).

In 1996, Chang won the George Foster Peabody Award for his news documentary “Passport to Kill”. The series of reports tracked suspected killers of children and cops who fled to the Dominican Republic, where they were protected by outdated extradition laws. The laws were changed. In 2006. He won an Edward R. Murrow Award for a story on police using high-tech equipment to spy on an amorous couple. As a producer with ABC Primetime Live, his work contributed to the jailing of Byron De la Beckwith, the assassin of civil rights leader Medgar Evers, 29 years after the murder.

Chang is also the recipient of five Emmys, Press Association awards in Philadelphia, Denver, Detroit and New York, AP and UPI awards, and Asian American Journalists Association (AAJA) and National Association of Black Journalists (NABJ) awards including a Lifetime Achievement Award from AAJA. An active figure in the Asian American community, he has previously served both on the national and local New York Board of Directors for the AAJA. Chang's writing has been published in The New York Times, the Detroit Free Press and The Detroit News.

In 2004 he was given an honorary Doctor of Humanities degree from New York City College of Technology.

In 2002, he married fashion designer Elaine Huie. Chang is a practitioner of Brazilian jiu-jitsu at Renzo Gracies in New York City.

On March 9, 2020, he joined The Young Turks network as an investigative climate reporter.

In 2022 Chang began working as a freelance MMJ for Newsday TV. His series on the mistakes made by Suffolk County Police investigating the Gilgo Beach serial killer or killers won a New York Press Club Award for crime reporting in 2023.
