= ValueAct Capital =

San Francisco-based investment company

ValueAct Capital Management, L.P.
- Type: Private
- Industry: Investment
- Founded: 2000; 26 years ago in San Francisco, California, United States
- Founder: Jeffrey Ubben
- Headquarters: Letterman Digital Arts Center, San Francisco, California, U.S.
- Key people: Mason Morfit, Rob Hale
- AUM: US$10 billion (2024)
- Subsidiaries: Value Act Capital LLC, ValueAct Capital Master Fund LP, ValueActCapital Partners LP
- Website: ValueAct.com

ValueAct Capital is a San Francisco-based investment management firm. As of 2024, the firm managed about $10 billion in assets. The company is a privately owned hedge fund that invests in the public equity markets.

== History ==
ValueAct Capital was initially formed in June 2000 to manage the capital of its founders, along with the capital of a limited number of outside investors. The firm was led by Jeff Ubben from its founding until 2020 when Mason Morfit became CEO. Jeff Ubben left the firm in 2020. In 2024, Rob Hale was elevated to the role of Co-CEO alongside Morfit.

== Investment style ==
ValueAct has been described as an "activist investor" which keeps a low profile in the financial media. A 2023 Reuters story opined that it "distinguishes itself from other activist investors by preferring to stay behind the scenes and rarely presents its investment ideas publicly."

== Significant investments ==
Significant investments have included the following:

- Rolls-Royce: In August 2020, the company sold all of the stake capital of Rolls-Royce.
- Microsoft: In May 2013 ValueAct Capital revealed that it had purchased $2 billion worth of Microsoft stock (less than 1%). Shortly thereafter the company announced that Steve Ballmer decided to leave Microsoft. The company subsequently announced an agreement to share information and work with ValueAct, as well as to give ValueAct an option to join the board of directors. It was speculated that pressure from ValueAct led to Ballmer's decision to leave the company but both Ballmer and Microsoft have said otherwise. Morfit joined the Microsoft Board of Directors in early 2014 and served until late 2017 during which time the company thrived under new CEO Satya Nadella.
- The New York Times Company: ValueAct disclosed a 7% stake in The New York Times Company in August 2022. ValueAct aims to encourage the company to more actively pursue the sale of "bundled" subscriptions to its various offerings.
- Salesforce: ValueAct revealed a stake in Salesforce in January 2023. On January 27, 2023, Salesforce announced the appointment of three new directors to its board, including Mason Morfit, CEO and CIO of ValueAct Capital.
- Meta: In November 2024 it was revealed that ValueAct had taken a $1 billion position in Meta.
- Rocket Companies: In May 2025 ValueAct disclosed a 9.9% stake in Rocket Companies, the parent company of Rocket Mortgage.
