= David Kramer (talent agent) =

American talent agency executive

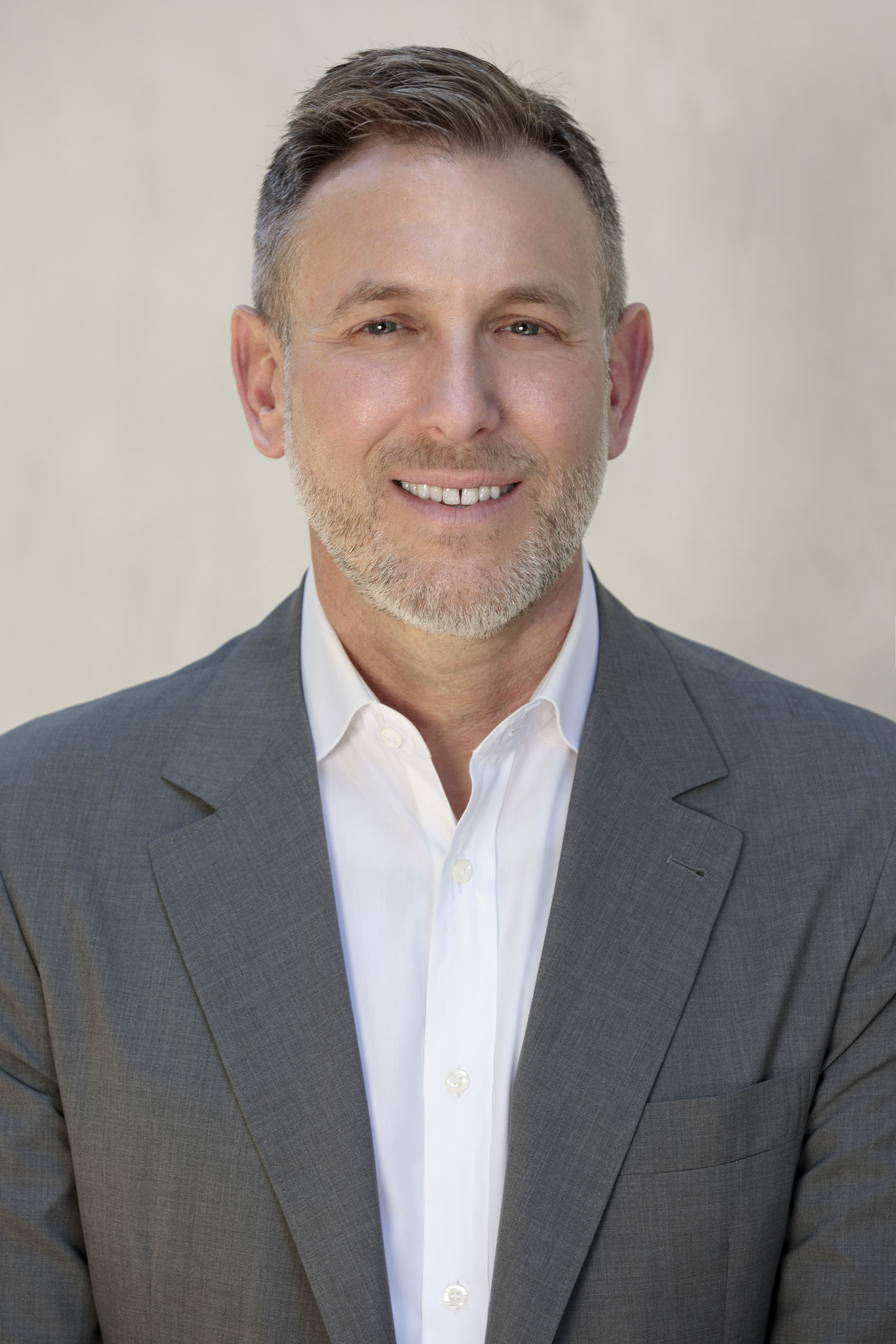
- Born: Tallahassee, Florida, US
- Education: Henry W. Grady College of Journalism and Mass Communication (University of Georgia); USC School of Cinematic Arts (University of Southern California)
- Occupation: CEO of United Talent Agency
- Employer: United Talent Agency
- Board member of: Jonsson Comprehensive Cancer Center; Harold Ramis Film School; Peabody Awards

David Kramer is an American entertainment industry executive and talent agent. He is the chief executive officer of United Talent Agency.

== Early life and education ==
Kramer was born in Tallahassee, Florida, and is of Jewish descent. He studied journalism at the University of Georgia, graduating from the Henry W. Grady College of Journalism and Mass Communication in 1990. While in school, he completed an internship for the Georgia Film Commission, and was an office production assistant for the film Murder in Mississippi (1990). Kramer earned his master's degree from the University of Southern California in 1992, through the USC School of Cinematic Arts' Peter Stark Producing Program.

== Career ==
Kramer's career with United Talent Agency (UTA) began in 1992, working in the agency's mailroom and later becoming assistant to co-founder Peter Benedek. He became an agent in the motion picture literary department and was named a partner in 2002. He was then appointed to the board of directors in 2008.

Kramer and Jay Sures held managing director roles starting in 2010. Both became co-presidents in September 2017. Kramer leads the agency's motion picture group, which focuses on areas including film finance, media rights, production, and talent. He also heads UTA's comedy touring, endorsement, licensing, and publishing efforts. In September 2022 Kramer was named president of UTA. He became the chief executive officer of UTA in 2025.

In 2017, Kramer and Sures, along with UTA's chief executive officer, Jeremy Zimmer, ranked number 33 on The Hollywood Reporter's list of the 100 "most powerful people in entertainment", in addition to earning a spot on The New York Observer's 2017 list of "Content Kings".

Throughout his career as a talent agent, Kramer has represented Judd Apatow, John August, Brad Bird, Jonathan Dayton and Valerie Faris, Dan Futterman, Michael Goldenberg, Curtis Hanson, Rick Jaffa and Amanda Silver, Charlie Kaufman, Ehren Kruger, Roger Kumble, and Robin Swicord.

== Personal life ==
Kramer has been on the Jonsson Comprehensive Cancer Center's board of directors since 2009. He was appointed to the advisory board of the Harold Ramis Film School, opened by The Second City, in early 2016. Kramer was appointed to the advisory board for the Peabody Award program, which is presented by the University of Georgia's Henry W. Grady College of Journalism and Mass Communication, in 2017. In 2018, he joined the Lincoln Center for Performing Arts Corporate Fund's Media and Entertainment Council and co-chaired their inaugural event, which featured performances by Patina Miller, Demetri Martin and Michelle Wolf.
