= Your Money =

- Also known as: CNN Money
- Presented by: Christine Romans
- Country of origin: United States
- Original language: English

Production
- Running time: 30 minutes

Original release
- Network: CNN
- Release: August 15, 1992 – October 25, 2014

CNN Money, formerly known as In the Money, Your $$$$$, and Your Money is a thirty-minute news show last hosted by Christine Romans broadcast by CNN from the Time Warner Center studios in New York City. The business program was a week-in-review of that week's financial stories, with analysis of consumer impact from those stories; it was the final CNN program with an exclusive business focus. The show was formerly hosted by Ali Velshi before his move to Al Jazeera America. The program was last shown on Saturdays at 2:00 pm EST.

The show was renamed on June 7, 2014 to coincide with the launch of the new CNNMoney.com. It was canceled in October 2014.

== Segments ==
- The Buzz is a timed look at business stories making top headlines.
- Money Time features a pre-recorded minute long look at a plethora of business and technology oriented stories. It is tracked by Romans.
- View From the Top profiles some of the top people in business.
