= Shaf Keshavjee =

Canadian surgeon (born 1961)

Dr. Shaf Keshavjee CC OOnt
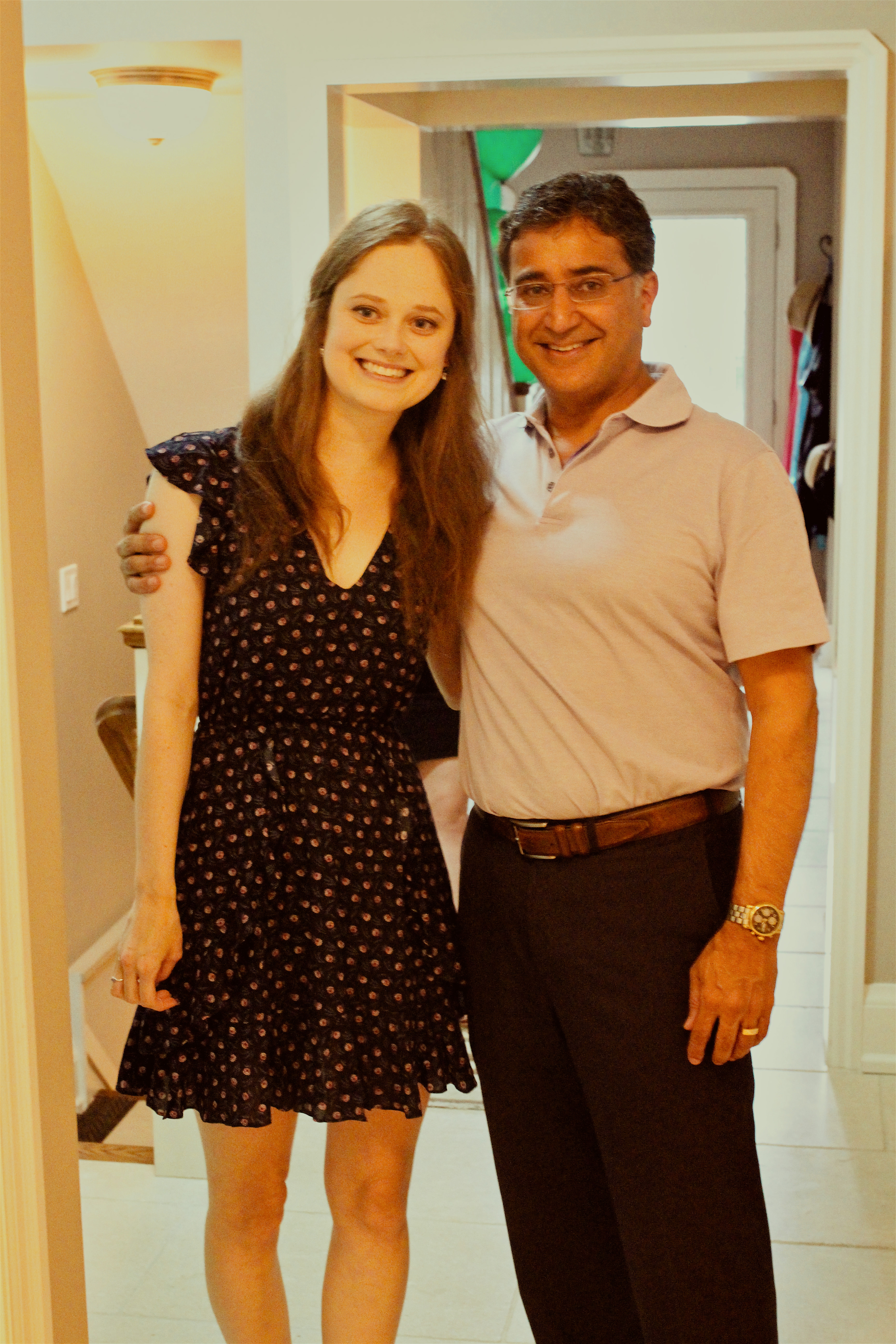
- Keshavjee (right), with Katie Sutherland, who received a double lung transplant
- Born: Toronto, Ontario, Canada
- Education: University of Toronto (MD), Harvard University (fellowship in airway surgery), University of London (fellowship in heart-lung transplant)
- Relatives: Mohamed Keshavjee
- Medical career
- Profession: Thoracic and transplant surgeon
- Research: Lung injury related to lung transplantation, molecular diagnostics for transplantation, gene therapy in lung transplantation

Shaf Keshavjee (born 1961) is a Canadian surgeon and the current surgeon-in-chief at University Health Network in Toronto, the director of the Toronto Lung Transplant Program, as well as a clinical scientist and professor with the University of Toronto.

His clinical practice in thoracic surgery and transplant surgery is based at the Toronto General Hospital, where he also leads a research team in lung transplantation studies. Keshavjee gained international recognition for the development of his lung preservation solution for donor lungs en route to transplantation; this solution is now the standard technique utilized by transplantation programs around the world. Further, he broke new ground with his research to the recondition and repair of injured human donor lungs, making them suitable for patient transplantation, using the Toronto XVIVO Lung Perfusion System. His work has allowed for an increase in the number of available donor lungs.

== Education and training ==
In 1985, Keshavjee completed his medical degree at the University of Toronto. He did a comprehensive surgical internship at the Mount Sinai Hospital in 1986. His Research Fellowship and Surgical Scientist Program in the Division of Thoracic Surgery were done at the University of Toronto and Toronto General Hospital in 1989. That same year he received his MSc in the Institute of Medical Science at the University of Toronto.

A few years later in 1993, Keshavjee became a Fellow in Thoracic Surgery at the Memorial Sloan-Kettering Cancer Centre in New York City. In 2012, he went to Harvard University, Harvard Kennedy School, and Cambridge University to obtain a degree in continuing education for Leadership for the 21st Century: Chaos, Conflict and Courage. In 1994, he joined the faculty at the University of Toronto.

== Current appointments ==
- 1994–Present: Director of Thoracic Surgery Research Laboratory, Toronto General Research Institute (TGRI) and University of Toronto (U of T)
- 1995–Present: Faculty in the Institute of Medical Sciences, School of Graduate Studies at the University of Toronto
- 1997–Present: Senior Scientist, Division of Experimental Therapeutics, UHN, TGRI
- 1997–Present: Director, Toronto Lung Transplant Program, Toronto General Hospital (TGH) and The Hospital for Sick Children
- 2002–Present: Professor of Surgery, Department of Surgery, U of T
- 2010–2023: Surgeon-in-Chief, Sprott Department of Surgery, UHN
- 2012–Present: Adjunct Scientist, Hospital for Sick Children Research Institute
- 2022–Present: Techna Scientific Director and Chief of Clinical Innovation at UHN

== Awards and recognition ==
=== Boards and societies ===
Keshavjee has served on the board of directors of the International Society for Heart and Lung Transplantation, the Canadian Society of Transplantation, and on the Governing Council of the American Association for Thoracic Surgery.

=== Awards ===
Over the course of his career, he has received many awards for his medical contributions. These have included:

- The George Armstrong Peters Young Investigator Award
- Canada's Top 40 Under 40 Award
- The Colin Woolf Award for Excellence in Continuing Medical Education
- The Lister Prize in Surgery

The Lister Prize in Surgery is the highest award for research achievement that one can obtain within the University of Toronto's Department of Surgery.

On February 6, 2013, Keshavjee was inducted into the Order of Ontario. He has also received two Queen's Jubilee medals in recognition for his work.

On December 26, 2014, Keshavjee was made an officer of the Order of Canada.

On December 31, 2025 he was promoted to Companion of the Order of Canada.

=== TED MED ===
At TED MED 2010, Keshavjee gave a talk entitled Can a human lung breathe outside the body, in which he addressed the process of repairing organs outside the human body.

== Achievements ==
At his Thoracic Surgery Research Laboratory, Kehavjee's research interests include lung transplantation, lung injury, and lung preservation. His current studies examine molecular diagnostics and gene therapy strategies for engineering organs for lung transplantation. The Lab's work explores the underlying mechanisms of ischemia-reperfusion injury and bronchiolitis obliterans – two areas that limit successful lung transplantation – and develops gene therapy strategies for either preventing or reversing them. Several areas within ischemia-reperfusion injury are examined, including the role of complement and cytokine-related lung injury and its relation to reperfusion. The work is done on cell culture models, rat single lung transplant models, and pig single lung transplant models.

=== Lung preservation ===
Keshavjee and his research team have developed a technique of lung preservation that can improve lung function after its transplantation. The solution is made from low-potassium dextran and is used in the Ex Vivo.

The LPD solution is applied in both the Toronto lung transplant program and in clinical programs around the world.

=== Gene therapy in lung transplantation ===
Keshavjee's research team focuses its main efforts on the role of gene therapy in lung transplantation. They are currently developing techniques for genetically modifying the donor lung so it can withstand stress during the transplant process. Ultimately, these techniques would be used to address both ischemia-reperfusion injury and obliterative bronchiolitis.

Keshavjee's work has demonstrated that immunosuppression related to transplantation leads to an altered expression of the transgene, and immunosuppression will lead to the prolonged-expression of the transgene. To this effect, he and his team have proved that gene therapy will help recipients recover from lung transplantation surgery without a significant immune system response.

When addressing obliterative bronchiolitis in a rat tracheal transplant model of fibrous airway obliteration related to transplantation, Keshavjee's research showed that the adenoviral IL-10 gene transfection was able to prevent the development of bronchiolitis obliterans. This was the first time that a gene therapy strategy was able to treat this condition; a significant breakthrough as this condition affects over 50% of lung transplant recipients. The team is currently studying the effect of the IL-10 transfection on ischemia-reperfusion therapy, as well as mechanisms of cell death and the genes controlling the process.

== Toronto Lung Transplant Program ==
Keshavjee currently serves as the director of the Toronto Lung Transplant Program, a University of Toronto program that spans across UHN and the Hospital for Sick Children. It began in 1983, and expanded to pediatric lung transplantation surgeries in 1995. Located in the Toronto General Hospital, it has gained international recognition for performing several remarkable firsts, including: First successful single-lung transplant, first successful double lung transplant, first pediatric lung transplant, first pediatric lung transplant with mismatched blood types, first to use an EXVIVO outside of the body, and the first to use the Novalung ventilator to provide more time for those awaiting transplantation.

As a result of Keshavjee's breakthroughs, there have been steady increases in the number of transplants and the survival rate. While the one-year survival rate for lung transplant recipients is 85% and almost 30% for over 10 years, the TLTP has 22 patients who have survived 20 or more years after receiving their donor lungs.

A gene-therapy trial will begin next year.

== Toronto Ex Vivo Lung Perfusion System (EVLP) ==
Donor lungs are placed in ice, with one tube attached to the pulmonary artery and another sewn to a vein used for training blood out of the lung. The lung is then moved onto a steel platform atop the device and hooked to a circuit with a ventilator and heart-lung mimicking machine that pumps the preservation solution into them. As they are brought up to body temperature, they are healed with an anti-inflammatory solution (developed by Keshavjee). Eventually, the lungs begin to inflate and deflate as they are attached to a ventilator . For several hours, the lungs are monitored for functionality with blood gases, x-rays, bronchoscopies, resistance to the flow of fluid, and whether they are becoming less stiff. If the tests are deemed successful for function, they may go ahead and perform the transplantation.
