= Lynnette Khalfani-Cox =

American personal finance adviser, radio personality and author

- Born: 1968 (age 57–58); New York

Lynnette Khalfani-Cox (born 1968, New York) is an American personal finance adviser, radio personality, and author providing personal finance advice on the Russ Parr Morning Show, a Washington, D.C. radio show, since 2008.

== Career ==
Khalfani-Cox has written personal finance books for adults, co-authoring The Millionaire Kids Club (2017), a series of four money-management books for children aged 5–12, and released Zero Debt: The Ultimate Guide to Financial Freedom (2004). The book became a New York Times Best Seller.

Khalfani-Cox has appeared on The Oprah Winfrey Show, The Dr. Phil Show.

=== Honors and awards ===
In 2009, Khalfani-Cox and co-author Susan Beacham received an Excellence in Financial Literacy Education (EIFLE) Award from the Institute for Financial Literacy for her book, The Millionaire Kids Club. The Institute recognized the first three books in the series as Retail Book of the Year in the category of money-management books for children.

== Personal life ==
Khalfani-Cox and her husband, Earl, invested in real estate to lower tuition rates for their children.
