= Dorie Greenspan =

American author of cookbooks

Dorie Greenspan (born October 24, 1947) is an American cookbook author. The New York Times called her a "culinary guru" in 2004.

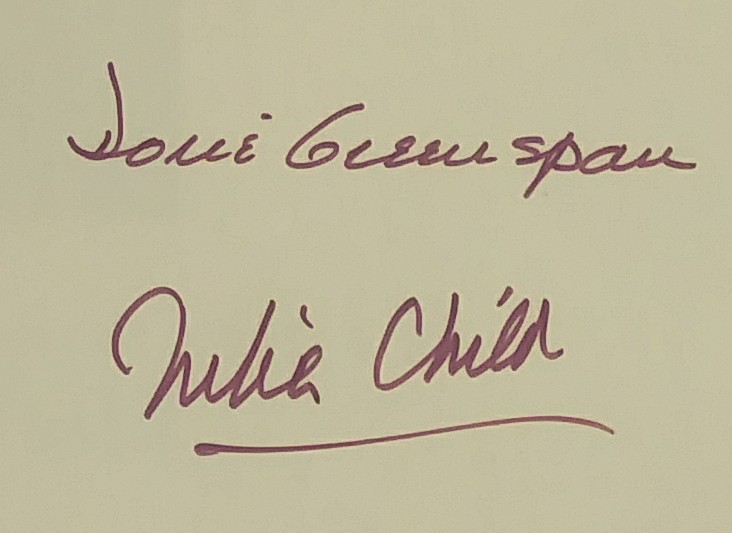
Signatures of Dorie Greenspan & Julia Child in a signed copy of Greenspan's book Baking with Julia

== Early life ==
Dorie Greenspan was born in Brooklyn, New York. Greenspan did not grow up cooking. When she was 13, she nearly burned down her family kitchen after attempting to deep fry frozen french fries. Greenspan attended Brooklyn College. At 19, while a student there, she wed. It was during her time in college that she began to cook out of necessity.

Greenspan initially pursued an academic path in gerontology. However, after the birth of her son, she found herself unable to finish her dissertation and uninterested in returning to academia. Her husband suggested she try baking, which became her entry point into the food industry. Greenspan found work as a baker, but was fired from her first baking job, describing her efforts as "terrible." She gradually built a career as a food writer, accepting small assignments and shadowing chefs.

== Culinary career ==
Greenspan has won the James Beard Foundation Award five times, as well as the International Association of Culinary Professionals Cookbook of the Year Awards for Desserts by Pierre Hermé and Around My French Table, and Dorie's Cookies. She has also been listed on the James Beard Foundation's Who's Who of Food and Beverage in America.

She is among the first culinary professionals to produce cooking applications for mobile phones and tablet computers.

== Personal life ==
Greenspan lives in Manhattan, Paris and Westbrook, Connecticut.

== Published works ==
- Sweet Times: Simple Desserts for Every Occasion (1991)
- Baking with Julia: Savor the Joys of Baking with America's Best Bakers (1996) (based on the PBS series with Julia Child)
- Pancakes: From Morning to Midnight (1997)
- Waffles from Morning to Midnight (1997)
- Desserts by Pierre Hermé (1998) (with Pierre Hermé)
- Daniel Boulud's Cafe Boulud Cookbook: French-American Recipes for the Home Cook (1999) (with Daniel Boulud)
- Chocolate Desserts by Pierre Hermé (2001)
- Paris Sweets: Great Desserts From the City's Best Pastry Shops (2002)
- Baking: From My Home to Yours (2006) Named one of Southern Living’s 100 Best Cookbooks of All Time
- Around My French Table: More Than 300 Recipes from My Home to Yours (2010)
- Baking Chez Moi: Recipes from My Paris Home to Your Home Anywhere (2014)
- Dorie's Cookies (2016) Named one of Southern Living’s 100 Best Cookbooks of All Time
- Everyday Dorie: The Way I Cook (2018)
- Baking With Dorie: Sweet, Salty & Simple (2021)
- Dorie’s Anytime Cakes (2025)
