= Greater Talent Network =

American speakers bureau

- Founded: 1981; 45 years ago in New York City, New York, U.S.
- Headquarters: New York City

Greater Talent Network (also known as GTN) was an American speakers bureau based in New York and is currently owned by United Talent Agency. GTN had a roster of clients, including authors Nicholas Sparks, Ben Shapiro, Michael Lewis, and P.J. O'Rourke; actors Laura Linney, Mark Ruffalo and Danny Glover; musicians Paula Abdul and Harry Belafonte; athletes Alex Rodriguez and Apolo Ohno; and Daniele Weisberg and Carly Zakin, founders of theSkimm.

== History ==
In September 2017, GTN was acquired by United Talent Agency.

== Clients included ==
- Nicholas Sparks
- Ben Shapiro
- Anthony Zuiker
- Paula Abdul
- Billy Beane
- Carl Bernstein
- Wesley Clark
- Ben Cohen and Jerry Greenfield, founders of Ben & Jerry's
- Sebastian Junger
- Raymond Kelly
- Michael Lewis
- Laura Linney
- Marcus Luttrell
- Marlee Matlin
- Bob Myers
- Bennet Omalu
- Ron Paul
- Mo Rocca
- Alec Ross
- P.J. O'Rourke
- Mark Ruffalo
- Dan Schulman
- Nicholas Sparks
- Leigh Anne Tuohy
- Jose Antonio Vargas
- Jennifer Weiner
