= Qatar–United States relations =

Qatar–United States
- Qatar: United States

Diplomatic mission
- Embassy of Qatar, Washington, D.C.: Embassy of the United States, Doha

Qatar and the United States are strategic allies. Qatar has been designated a major non-NATO ally by the United States. Qatar maintains an embassy in Washington, D.C. and the U.S. has an embassy in Doha.

== History ==
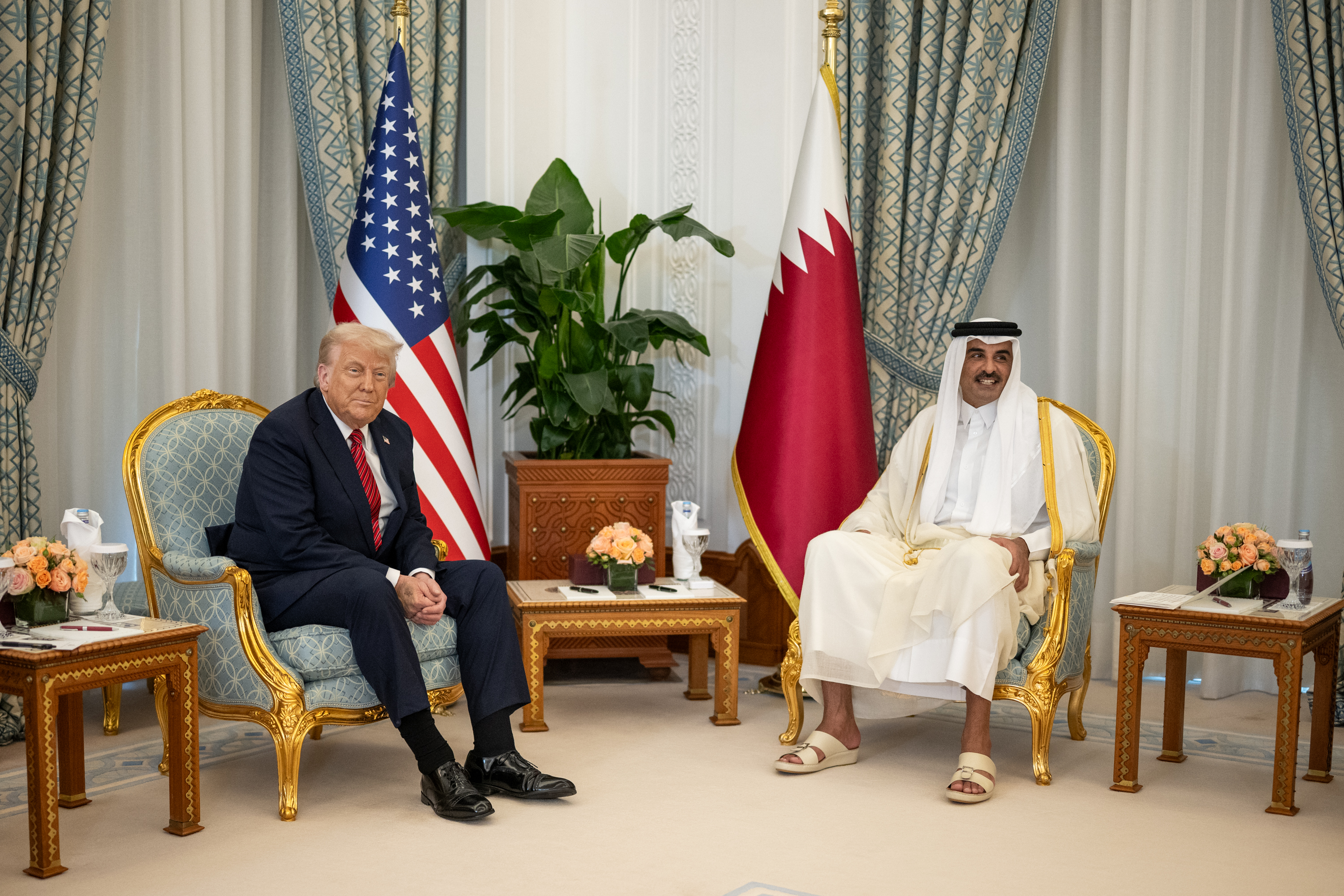
United States President Donald Trump with the Emir of Qatar Tamim bin Hamad Al Thani, May 2025

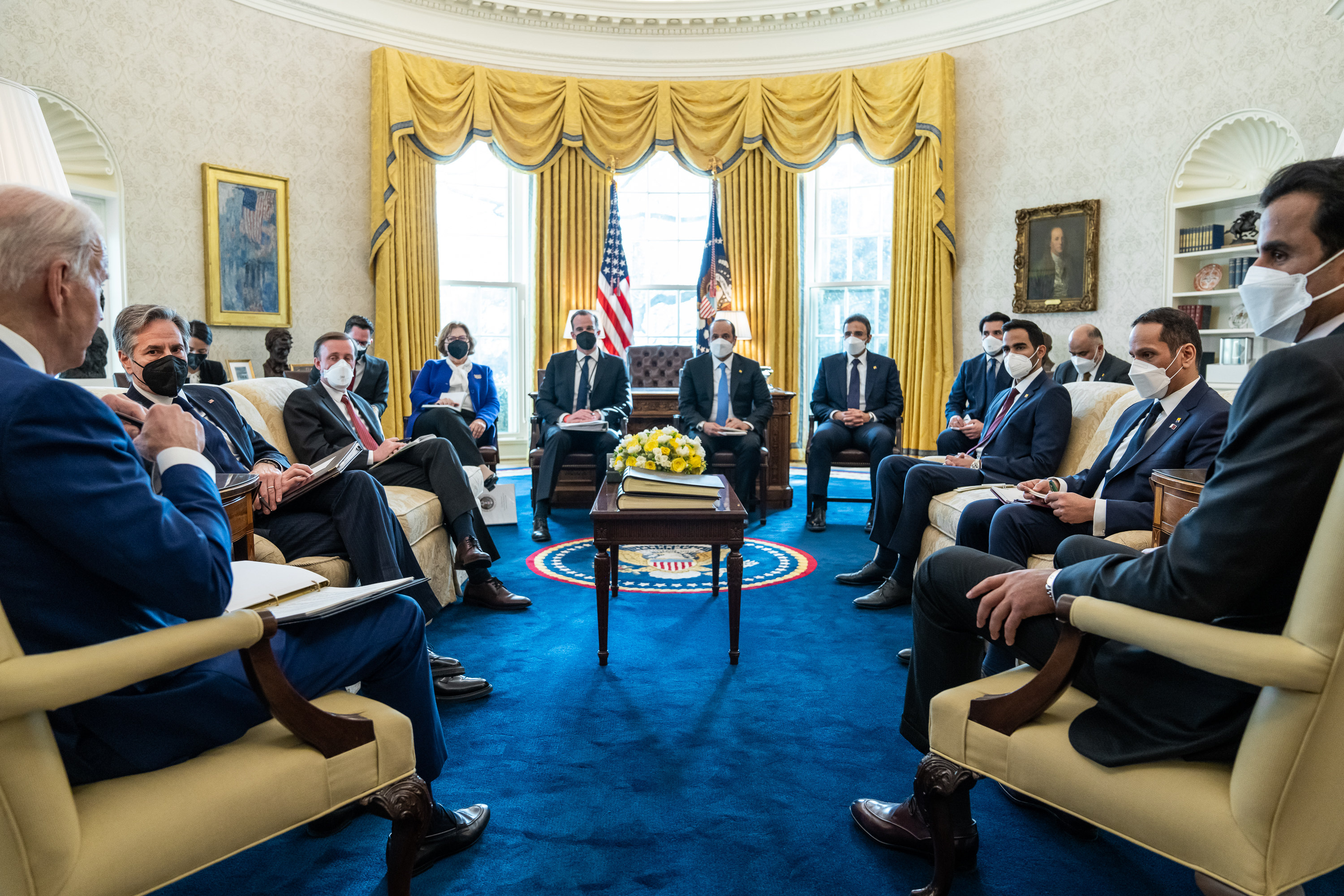
Joe Biden participates in a bilateral meeting with Sheikh Tamim bin Hamad Al Thani, January 2022

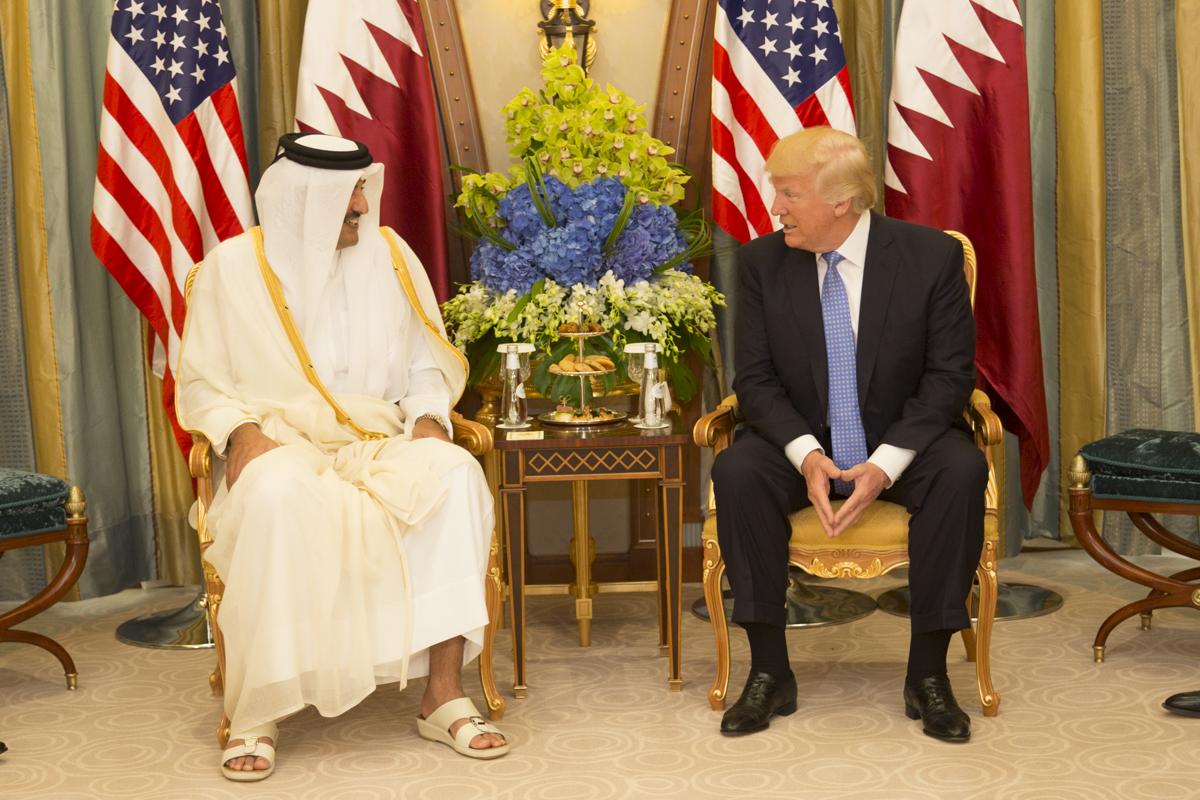
United States President Donald Trump with the Emir of Qatar Tamim bin Hamad Al Thani, May 2017

The United States formed diplomatic relations with Qatar on 19 March 1972, when diplomat William Stoltzfus met with Qatari government officials and submitted his credentials. Bilateral relations between the two countries have expanded since the opening of the U.S. embassy in Doha in March 1973. The first resident U.S. ambassador arrived in July 1974. Qatar and the United States coordinate closely on Middle Eastern regional diplomatic initiatives to increase security in the Persian Gulf. The two countries also have extensive economic links, especially in the hydrocarbons sector. Qatar has also developed international educational institutions in the region to cater to the Middle Eastern market. Qatar also hosts an American military facility.

During the 2017 Qatar diplomatic crisis, the United States President Donald Trump claimed credit for engineering the diplomatic crisis in a series of tweets. On 6 June, Trump began by tweeting: "During my recent trip to the Middle East I stated that there can no longer be funding of Radical Ideology. Leaders pointed to Qatar – look!" An hour and a half later, he remarked on Twitter that it was "good to see the Saudi Arabia visit with the King and 50 countries already paying off. They said they would take a hard line on funding extremism, and all reference [sic] was pointing to Qatar. Perhaps this will be the beginning of the end to the horror of terrorism!" This was in contrast to attempts by The Pentagon and State Department to remain neutral. The Pentagon praised Qatar for hosting the Al Udeid Air Base and for its "enduring commitment to regional security." U.S. Ambassador to Qatar, Dana Shell Smith, sent a similar message. Earlier, the US Secretary of State had taken a neutral stance and called for dialogue. Qatar hosts about 10,000 U.S. troops at Al Udeid Air Base, which houses the forward operating base of United States Central Command that plays a commanding role in US airstrikes in Syria, Iraq, and Afghanistan. A Pentagon spokesperson claimed the diplomatic crisis would not affect the US military posture in Qatar. On 8 June, President Donald Trump, during a phone call with the Emir of Qatar Tamim bin Hamad Al Thani, offered as a mediator in the conflict with a White House meeting between the parties if necessary. The offer was declined, and Qatari official stated, "The emir has no plans to leave Qatar while the country is under a blockade."

On 30 January 2018 an inaugural United States-Qatar Strategic Dialogue meeting was held, co-chaired by U.S. Secretary of State Rex Tillerson, U.S. Secretary of Defense Jim Mattis, Qatari Deputy Prime Minister and Minister of State for Defense Khalid al-Attiyah and Qatari Deputy Prime Minister and Foreign Minister Mohammed bin Abdulrahman Al Thani. The meeting expressed the need for an immediate resolution of the crisis which respects Qatar's sovereignty. In a Joint Declaration on Security Cooperation the U.S. expressed its readiness to deter and confront any external threat to Qatar's territorial integrity. Qatar offered to help fund the expansion of facilities at U.S. bases in Qatar.

== Educational ties ==
Over 1,000 Qatari students study in the United States. Six U.S. universities have branch campuses in Qatar's Education City complex. There are Virginia Commonwealth University School of the Arts in Qatar (VCUQ), Weill Cornell Medical College in Qatar (WCMC-Q), Texas A&M University at Qatar (TAMUQ), Carnegie Mellon University in Qatar (CMU-Q), Georgetown University School of Foreign Service in Qatar (SFS-Qatar), and Northwestern University in 2008.

The relationship between Qatar and the American Academy began in the 1970s and 1980s. In the twenty-first century, Qatar has become the largest foreign donor. Between 2001 and 2021, Qatar donated $4.7 billion to a variety of academic institutions across the United States.

== Diplomatic exchanges ==
=== Diplomatic visits ===
Emir Tamim bin Hamad Al Thani visited Washington in July 2019, and President George W. Bush visited Qatar in 2003 where he spoke to troops stationed there. Donald Rumsfeld, the 21st Secretary of Defense from 2001 to 2006, also visited Qatar in 2002. Secretary of State Hillary Clinton visited Qatar in February 2010, and Secretary John Kerry traveled to Qatar in March 2013.

Post Sheikh Tamim and Donald Trump's meeting in July 2019, Qatar agreed to purchase "tremendous amounts of military equipment" and Boeing planes from the United States. The deal has been signed with some of the major US companies, including Boeing, General Electric, Raytheon, Gulfstream Aerospace and Chevron Phillips Chemical and is expected to cost tens of billions of dollars. Sheikh Tamim also announced to double Qatar's current economic partnership of more than $185 billion with the US.

President Biden and his top advisors have made several visits to Qatar during the ongoing Israel–Hamas conflict. The visits were focused on advancing negotiations to secure the release of hostages held by Hamas and discussing the war in Gaza.

On 24 October 2024, Prime Minister Mohammed bin Abdulrahman Al Thani of Qatar, alongside U.S. Secretary of State Antony Blinken, met in Doha to discuss the Gaza conflict, emphasizing the need for a ceasefire and efforts to release hostages. Al Thani expressed concerns about the expansion of the war to Lebanon and called for the implementation of UN Security Council Resolution 1701. Both leaders stressed the importance of finding a long-term solution for Gaza and the West Bank, with Blinken highlighting U.S. and Qatari roles in humanitarian aid and diplomacy to stabilize the region.

On 14 May 2025, Donald Trump became the first U.S. President ever to visit Qatar during the second foreign trip of his second term.

=== Diplomatic efforts ===
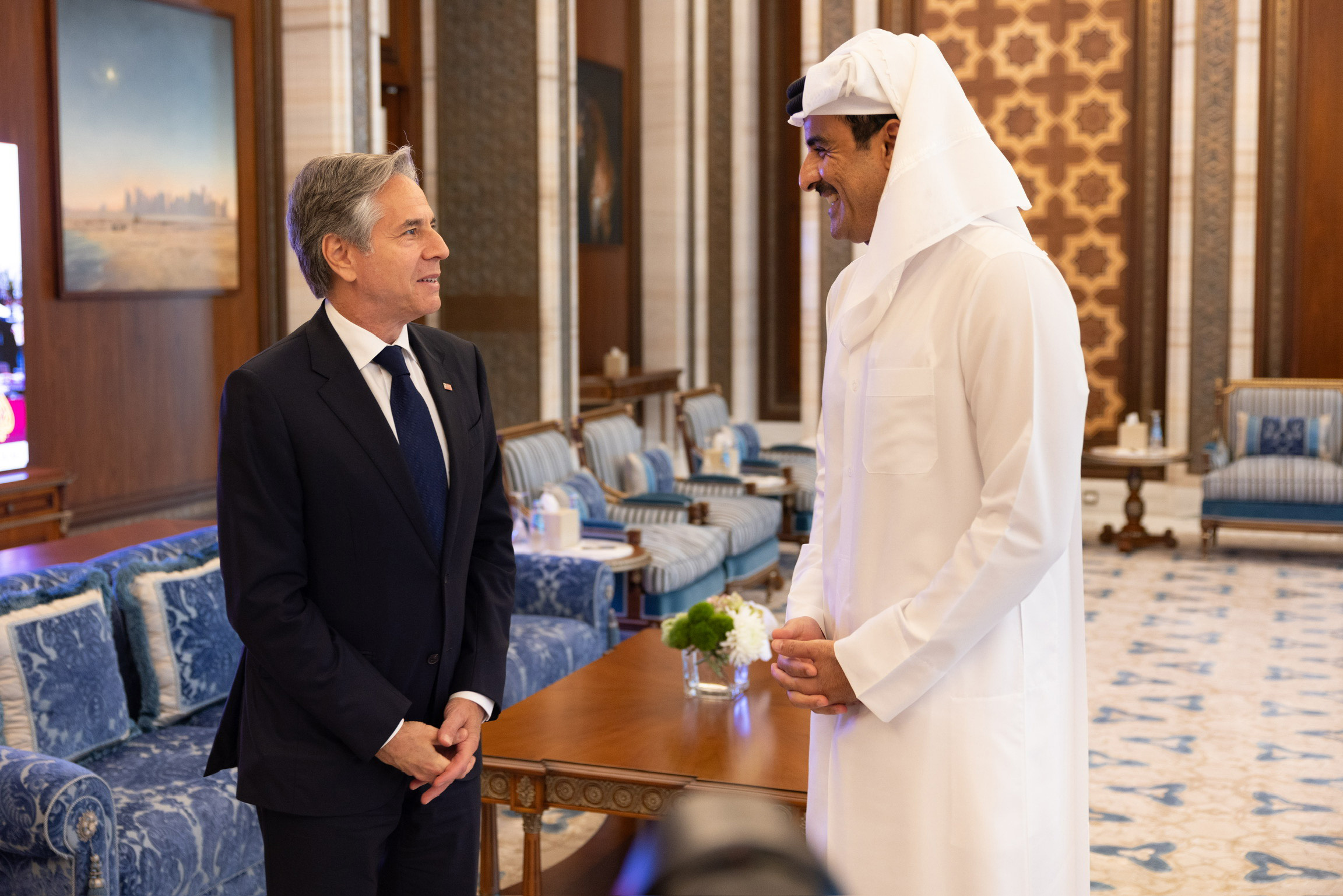
Qatar's Emir Tamim bin Hamad Al Thani meets with US Secretary of State Antony Blinken, 12 June 2024

Qatar mediated a deal between the United States and Iran, which in September 2023 saw the release of five prisoners in each country and the unfreezing of US$6 billion of Iranian funds, which had been frozen due to sanctions imposed by the U.S. The U.S. citizens were flown to Doha and greeted by U.S. ambassador to Qatar Timmy T. Davis and Qatar Airways CEO Akbar Al Baker before boarding a plane to Washington, D.C. U.S. President Joe Biden thanked Sheik Tamim and Qatari officials for their role in the mediation as well as establishing a "Humanitarian channel" for Iran. The US$6 billion were released to banks in Doha under the condition that Iran could use the funds only for humanitarian purposes.

During the 78th session of the United Nations General Assembly, Qatari officials set up meetings with both countries, hoping to make progress on further talks regarding Iran's uranium enrichment and export of drones.

On 7 October 2023, the Gaza war escalated, following a massive invasion of Israeli territory by Palestinian militant organizations. Amid the conflict, Qatar played a crucial role in securing the release of two American hostages from Hamas. This act of mediation was highly praised by US President Joe Biden. Additionally, Qatar Airways facilitated the safe return of more than 200 Australians from Israel.

=== Residential staff ===
United States

Principal U.S. officials include:

- Chargé d'affaires ad interim – Stefanie Altman-Winans

The U.S. maintains an embassy in Doha, Qatar.

Qatar

Principal Qatari officials include:

- Ambassador—Sheikh Meshal bin Hamad Al Thani: Ambassador of Qatar to the United States since December 2016

Qatar maintains an embassy in Washington, D.C.

== Bilateral trade ==
Qatar and the United States enjoy close economic and trade relations. The United States is Qatar's fifth trading partner and the primary source of imports which amounts to $4.108bn. During January–August 2021, the Qatar–US bilateral trade reached $3.2bn.

The US has officially designated Qatar as a major non-NATO ally, enhancing the partnership between Doha and Washington and giving the Gulf country special economic and military privileges in its relationship with the US. This marks Qatar's third Gulf ally, following Kuwait and Bahrain. The US State Department praised the designation as a symbol of the close relationship and respect for the friendship between the two countries.

In October 2026, QatarEnergy announced massive multi-decade agreements to purchase 7 million metric tons per annum (mtpa) of US liquefied natural gas (LNG) from Cheniere Energy and Woodside Energy through 2054. The procurement was the first time Qatar relied on North American supply and global commodity arbitrage to fulfilll its international delivery obligations, serving as a corporate buffer against geopolitical blockades of the Strait of Hormuz.

== Military ==
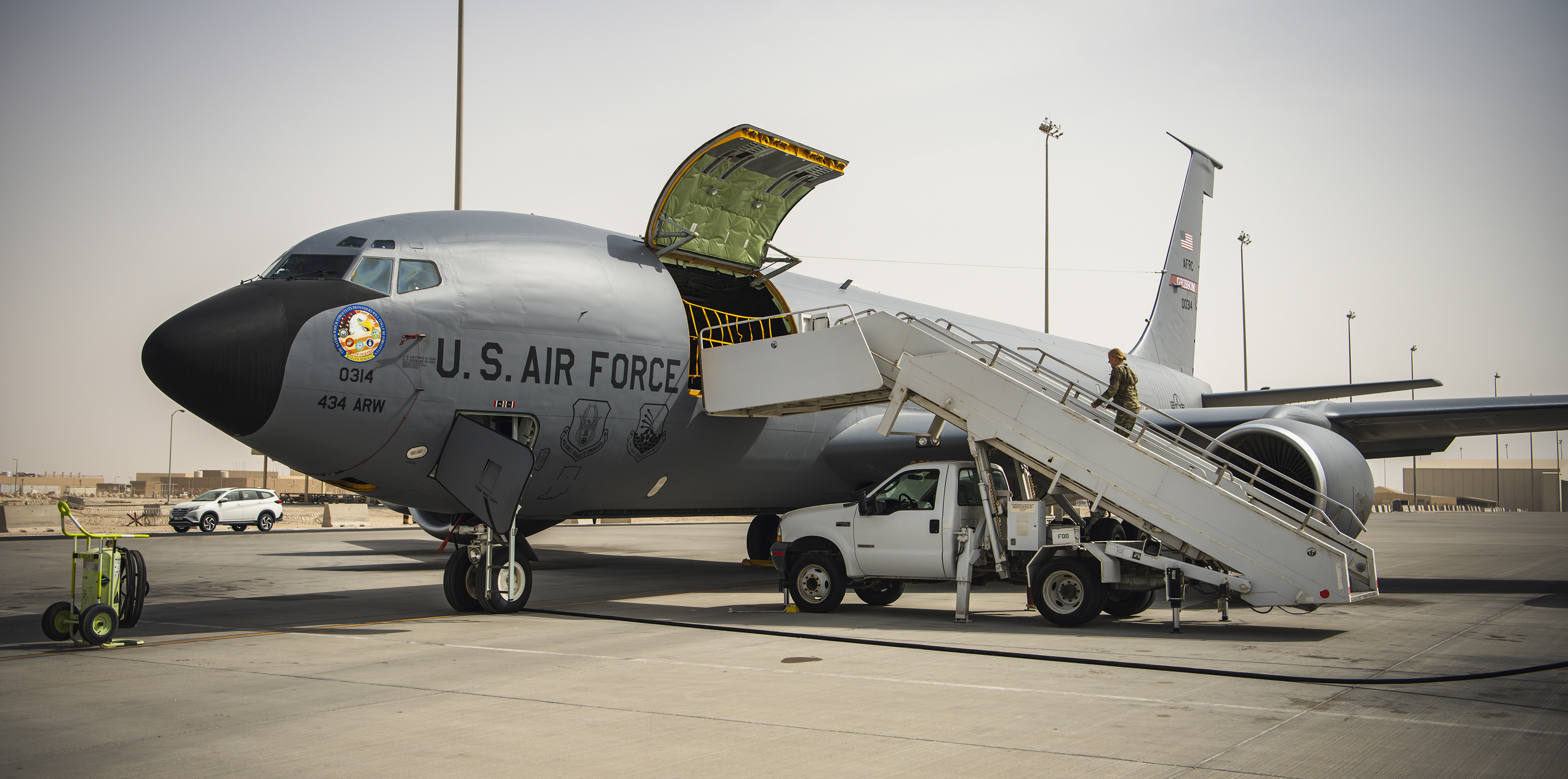
Al Udeid Air Base in 2022

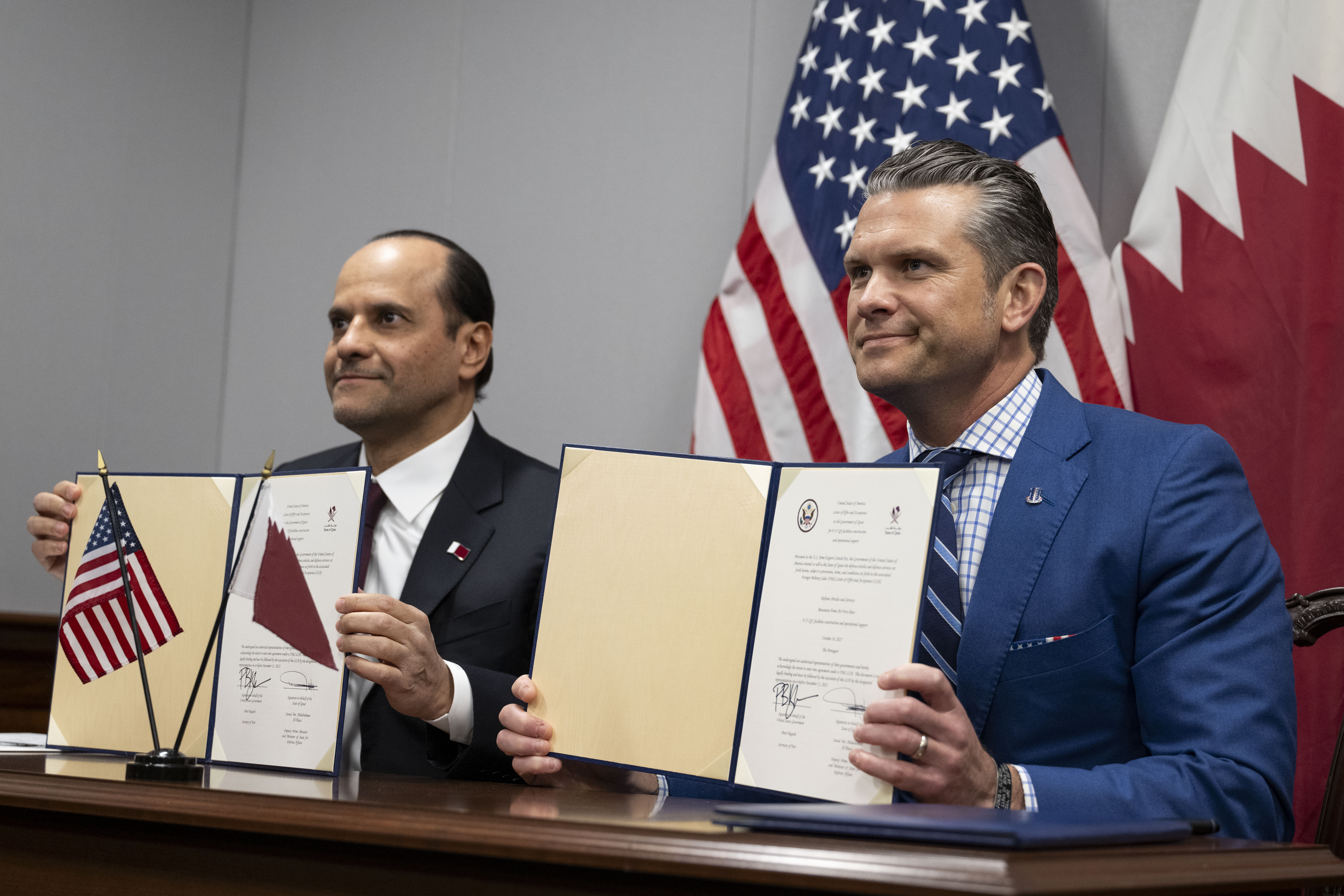
U.S. Secretary of Defense Pete Hegseth and Qatari Defense Minister Saoud bin Abdulrahman Al Thani sign a letter of agreement for a Qatari Air Force facility in Idaho, 10 October 2025

Beginning in 1992, Qatar has built intimate military ties with the United States, and is now the location of U.S. Central Command's Forward Headquarters and the Combined Air Operations Center.

As of 2015, the following American bases currently exist:

- Al Udeid Air Base
- As Sayliyah Army Base

In 2003, the US military base Doha International Air Base (also known as Camp Snoopy) was closed.

Former US Defense Secretary Robert Gates stated in May 2017 that he doesn't "know instances in which Qatar aggressively goes after (terror finance) networks of Hamas, Taliban, Al-Qaeda," and that "My attitudes toward Al-Udeid and any other facility is that the United States military doesn’t have any irreplaceable facility." Qatar hosts the largest American base in the Middle East, the Al Udeid Air Base, which has been used by the United States in its campaigns in Iraq, Syria and Afghanistan.

In 2014, the United States sold $11 billion worth of arms to Qatar, including AH-64 Apache attack helicopters and Patriot and Javelin defense systems.

In June 2017, Qatar signed a $12 billion deal to buy 36 F-15QA strike aircraft from the United States, with Boeing as the prime contractor on the sale.

On 29 September 2025, US President Trump issued an executive order committing to the defense of Qatar—including retaliatory military action—if it is attacked. The actual scope of the order remains in question because legally binding agreements or treaties must be approved by the US Senate.

On May 2, 2026, the United States approved the sale of Patriot missile defense systems to Qatar for an estimated $4.01 billion amid rising tensions in the Middle East.

== Disaster aid ==
Qatar donated $100 million in aid to New Orleans after Hurricane Katrina ravaged the Gulf Coast in August 2005.

When Hurricane Harvey hit the state of Texas from August to September 2017, Qatar's ambassador announced on 8 September that the country would be donating $30 million in aid to help rebuild Texas.

== See also ==
- N7478D
- Project Endgame
