= Jack Brooksbank =

English businessman (born 1986)

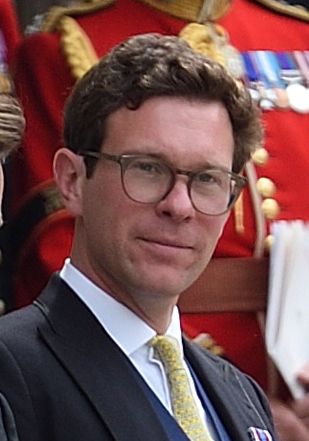
- Brooksbank in 2022
- Born: Jack Christopher Stamp Brooksbank; 3 May 1986 (age 40); St Thomas' Hospital, Lambeth, London, England
- Education: Stowe School; University of Bristol (no degree)
- Occupation: Marketing professional
- Spouse: Princess Eugenie (m. 2018)
- Children: 3

Jack Christopher Stamp Brooksbank (born 3 May 1986) is a British marketing executive and a member of the British royal family who is married to Princess Eugenie, a niece of King Charles III.

== Early life and family ==
Arms of the Brooksbank baronets: Azure two bars wavy Argent within a bordure Or. Crest: A hart's head couped Argent attired Or charged on the neck with two bars wavy Azure.

Jack Christopher Stamp Brooksbank was born on 3 May 1986 at St Thomas' Hospital in Lambeth, London, the first son of George Edward Hugh Brooksbank (1949–2021), a company director and chartered accountant, and his wife Nicola (née Newton; born 1953), great-granddaughter of Sir Frederick Charlton Meyrick, 2nd Baronet. He was christened at Guards' Chapel in Wellington Barracks. He is in remainder to the Brooksbank baronetcy. Jack has a younger brother, Thomas.

A half-third cousin twice-removed of Princess Eugenie through Thomas Coke, 2nd Earl of Leicester, (Note: Thomas Coke, 2nd Earl of Leicester, is Princess Eugenie's maternal great-great-great-great-grandfather (via his first marriage, to Juliana Whitbread) and Brooksbank's great-great-grandfather (via his second marriage, to The Honourable Georgina Cavendish).) Brooksbank's great-grandfather was Sir John (Jack) Spencer Coke, a Gentleman Usher to King George VI and Extra Gentleman Usher to Queen Elizabeth II, and his great-uncle was the 3rd Baron Hamilton of Dalzell.

== Education and career ==
Brooksbank was educated at Stowe School in Buckinghamshire, and the University of Bristol, which he left without earning a degree. His first job in the bar industry was as a bartender, before becoming the general manager of Mahiki, a nightclub in Mayfair that was often visited by his wife's cousins Prince William and Prince Harry in their youth. He later worked as a brand ambassador for Casamigos tequila. He was also reported to have his own wine wholesale business. In 2022, he began working in marketing, sales and promotion for property developer Michael Meldman's Discovery Land Company in Portugal.

== Marriage and family ==
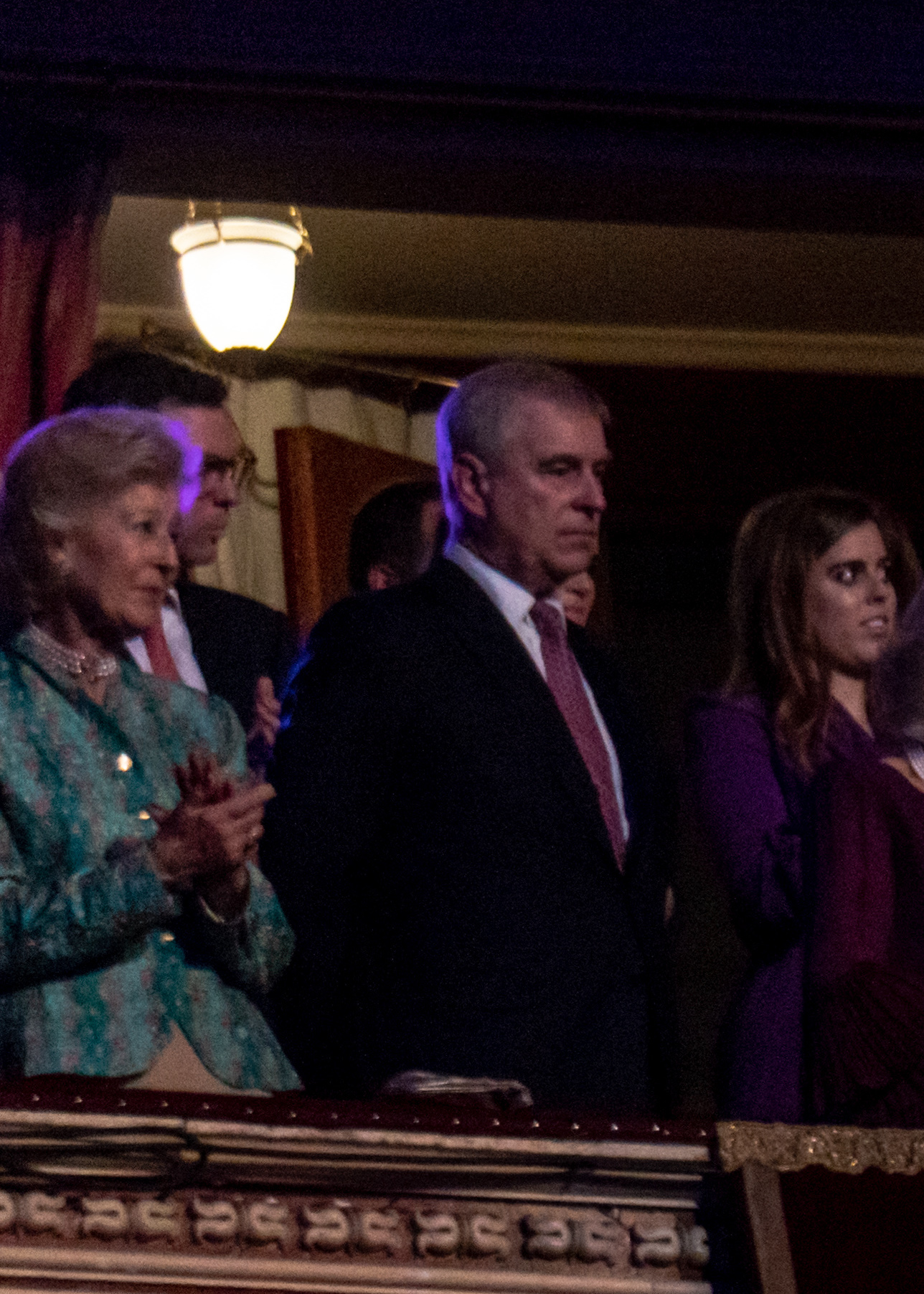
Brooksbank (rear left) in 2018, on the Royal Albert Hall balcony with members of the Royal Family including his father-in-law and Princess Alexandra

In 2011, Brooksbank began dating Princess Eugenie, the younger daughter of Andrew Mountbatten-Windsor and Sarah Ferguson. They had met in 2010 when Brooksbank was 24 and Eugenie was 20. On 22 January 2018, the Duke of York's office at Buckingham Palace announced their engagement. In April 2018, the couple moved from their residence at St James's Palace to Ivy Cottage, in the grounds of Kensington Palace. Their wedding took place on 12 October 2018, at St George's Chapel, Windsor. Contrary to press speculation that Brooksbank would be created "Earl of Northallerton", he has not been elevated to the peerage after marrying into the royal family, following a trend in recent years for a male commoner not to be awarded one upon marriage to a princess.

The couple's first son, August Philip Hawke Brooksbank, was born on 9 February 2021 at the Portland Hospital in London. At his birth, he was 11th in line to the throne. August was christened on 21 November 2021 at the Royal Chapel of All Saints in Windsor Great Park in a private service attended by Queen Elizabeth II alongside Lucas Tindall, son of Eugenie's cousin Zara Tindall. The couple's second son, Ernest George Ronnie Brooksbank, was born on 30 May 2023. Their third child, a daughter named Adelaide Elizabeth Annina Brooksbank, was born on 3 August 2026 at a hospital in Lisbon, Portugal.

== Honours ==
Date	Appointment	Ribbon
6 February 2022	Recipient of the Queen Elizabeth II Platinum Jubilee Medal	
6 May 2023	Recipient of the King Charles III Coronation Medal	
