= Discovery Land Company =

Real estate developer

- Company type: Private
- Industry: Real Estate
- Founded: 1994; 31 years ago
- Founder: Michael Meldman
- Revenue: $2 billion (2020)
- Website: discoverylandco.com

The Discovery Land Company is an American multi-national real estate development company and hospitality operator based in Scottsdale, Arizona. Founded in 1994 by Michael Meldman, the company operates private residential communities and clubs in North America, the Caribbean, Europe and the Middle East. In 2022, the company made public that they will follow an international expansion strategy. Discovery had an annual turnover of $2 billion in sales in 2020.

== History ==
Discovery Land Company was founded in 1994 by Michael S. Meldman. Previously, Meldman worked as a commercial broker in the San Francisco Bay Area in the early 1980s. His first independent real estate project was Blue Oaks in Portola Valley, California, which he developed with financing from three friends in the mid-1980s. In 1996, he opened The Estancia Club with more than 200 homes in Scottsdale, Arizona, a suburb of Phoenix. Its golf course was named the best new private course by Golf Digest.

In 1998, Discovery opened the Iron Horse in Whitefish, Montana, where it introduced their Outdoor Pursuits program. A year later, the company developed Kukio in Kona, Hawaii, and then 535-acre Vaquero Golf Club in Westlake, Texas, in 2000. Discovery acquired and completed The Hideaway in La Quinta, California, in 2002 following the original owner's failure to complete its development. The development consists of 500 residential lots, which were sold within 18 months of the project's relaunch. Discovery opened the Mountaintop Golf & Lake Club in Cashiers, North Carolina in 2003, and Gozzer Ranch Golf & Lake Club in Coeur d'Alene, Idaho in 2004.

The Yellowstone Club in Montana, a private ski and golf facility, was acquired jointly by Discovery and the Yellowstone Club organization in 2009, following the divorce of previous owners Tim Blixseth and Edra Blixseth.

Discovery's residential communities experienced growth due to the COVID-19 pandemic. In March 2020, approximately 100 families chose to quarantine at the Yellowstone Club in Big Sky, Montana, with additional residents staying at Discovery's Madison Club in La Quinta, California, and Silo Ridge Field Club in New York's Hudson Valley. The communities experienced a demographic shift, with an uptick in younger family residents.

Discovery acquired land in 2021 to build CostaTerra in Comporta south of Lisbon, Portugal.

The Driftwood Golf and Ranch Club opened in May 2022 near Austin, Texas.

Barbuda Ocean Club opened in 2023 on the island of Barbuda.

In May 2024, Discovery opened its first club in the Middle East, Discovery Dunes in Dubai, United Arab Emirates. The Austin Surf Club, a 190-acre site 15 miles from Austin, Texas and joint venture between Discovery and surfer Kelly Slater, was announced in 2024. The development has a 2,220 ft long surf basin and 140 residential units.

== Operations ==
Michael Meldman remains the chairman of the Discovery Land Company. The company has more than 35 properties in Hawaii, California, Arizona, Nevada, Idaho, Montana, Texas, Tennessee, New York, and North Carolina in the U.S., in addition to Los Cabos, Mexico, Great Guana Cay, The Bahamas, Dubai South, the United Arab Emirates, and Portugal.

The Discovery Land Foundation was established in 2007 to support the communities around the company's resorts. The foundation reports annual investments in the hundreds of millions.

As of 2022, Discovery's sustainability department manages programs focused on renewable energy, waste reduction, water conservation, and habitat preservation.

As of 2023, golf course architect Tom Fazio has created approximately fifteen golf courses for Discovery.
