= Princess Eugenie =

British princess (born 1990)

- Mrs Jack Brooksbank
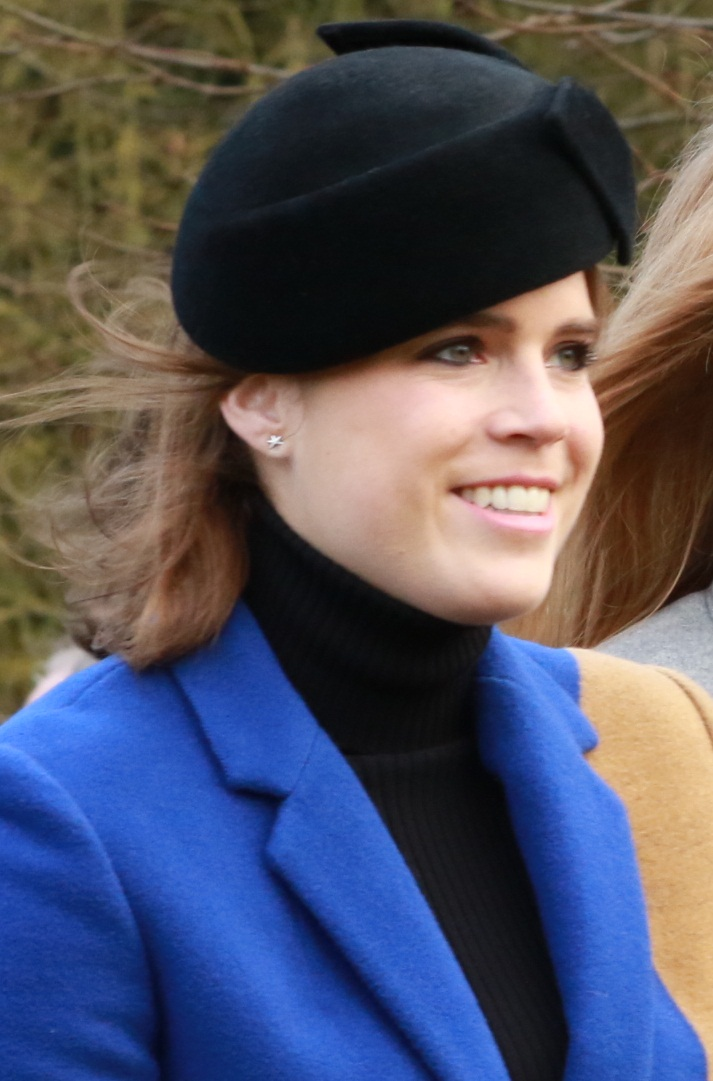
- Eugenie in 2017
- Born: Princess Eugenie of York; 23 March 1990 (age 36); Portland Hospital, London, England
- Spouse: Jack Brooksbank (m. 2018)
- Issue: August Brooksbank; Ernest Brooksbank; Adelaide Brooksbank
Names
- Eugenie Victoria Helena (Note: Before her marriage, as a member of the royal family, Eugenie did not use a family name, but if one had been needed, it was Mountbatten-Windsor. However, following a declaration by George V on 17 July 1917, this does not apply to female descendants in the male line of Queen Victoria who marry or who have married.)
- House: Windsor
- Father: Andrew Mountbatten-Windsor
- Mother: Sarah Ferguson
- Education: Newcastle University

Princess Eugenie, Mrs Jack Brooksbank (/ˈjuːʒəni/ YOO-zhə-nee; Eugenie Victoria Helena; born 23 March 1990), is a member of the British royal family. She is the younger daughter of Andrew Mountbatten-Windsor and Sarah Ferguson, and a niece of King Charles III. At birth, Eugenie was sixth in the line of succession to the British throne and is 12th as of 2026.

Eugenie was born at the Portland Hospital in London. She was educated at St George's School and Marlborough College before studying English Literature and History of Art at Newcastle University, graduating with a bachelor's degree. She worked at the auction house Paddle8 before taking a directing position at the art gallery Hauser & Wirth. Eugenie also works privately with a number of charitable organisations, including the Anti-Slavery Collective, which she co‑founded.

In 2018, Eugenie married Jack Brooksbank, a British marketing executive. They have two sons and a daughter.

== Early life ==
Eugenie was born at 7:58 pm on 23 March 1990 at the Portland Hospital in London, where she was delivered by caesarean section, to the then Duke and Duchess of York. She is the sixth grandchild of Queen Elizabeth II and Prince Philip, Duke of Edinburgh. She was baptised Eugenie Victoria Helena at St Mary Magdalene Church, Sandringham, by Peter Nott, Bishop of Norwich, on 23 December, (Note: Her godparents were James Ogilvy (her paternal second cousin once removed); Captain Alastair Ross; Susan Ferguson (her maternal step-grandmother); Julia Dodd-Noble; and Louise Blacker.) becoming the first royal baby to have a public christening and the only one of the Queen's grandchildren not to be baptised from the Lily Font.

Eugenie's parents divorced when she was six years old. The Duke and Duchess of York agreed to joint custody of their two children. After the divorce, Queen Elizabeth II provided £1.4 million to establish a trust fund for Eugenie and her sister, Beatrice. The sisters frequently travelled abroad with one or both of their parents.

In October 2002, the 12-year-old Eugenie underwent back surgery at the Royal National Orthopaedic Hospital in London to correct scoliosis; surgeons inserted two 300-millimetre (12 in) titanium rods into her spine. She did not require any further spinal surgery after the operation.

== Education and career ==
Eugenie began her education at Winkfield Montessori School, which she attended from 1992 to 1993. She then joined her sister at Upton House School in Windsor, where she studied until 1995. From 1995 to 2001, she attended Coworth Park School (now Coworth Flexlands School), followed by St George's School near Windsor Castle until 2003. She subsequently boarded at Marlborough College in Wiltshire for five years. During her time at Marlborough, Eugenie completed three A-levels, earning 'A' grades in Art and English Literature, and a 'B' in History of Art. After taking a gap year, she enrolled at Newcastle University in September 2009, graduating in 2012 with a 2:1 degree in English Literature and Art History.

In 2013, Eugenie relocated to New York City for a year to work as a benefit auctions manager at the online auction house Paddle8. In July 2015, she returned to London to join the contemporary art gallery Hauser & Wirth as an associate director, and was promoted to director in 2017.

In the Channel 5 documentary Beatrice and Eugenie: Pampered Princesses, royal commentator Richard Kay stated that Eugenie received taxpayer-funded security while travelling internationally during her gap year. In January 2022, reports emerged that Eugenie lost her taxpayer-funded police security in 2011, reportedly following an intervention by her uncle, Charles III (then Prince of Wales). The decision reflected concerns over the high cost of providing security for non‑working royals. During her gap year, Eugenie's taxpayer‑funded security reportedly cost more than £100,000. Charles considered the expense excessive, as Eugenie and Beatrice were unlikely to take on major royal duties. The move is said to have angered the Duke, who argued to the Queen that his daughters should be treated as full members of the royal family.

In July 2023, Eugenie joined the advisory board of Goals House, a community dedicated to advancing the United Nations' Sustainable Development Goals.

== Marriage and family ==
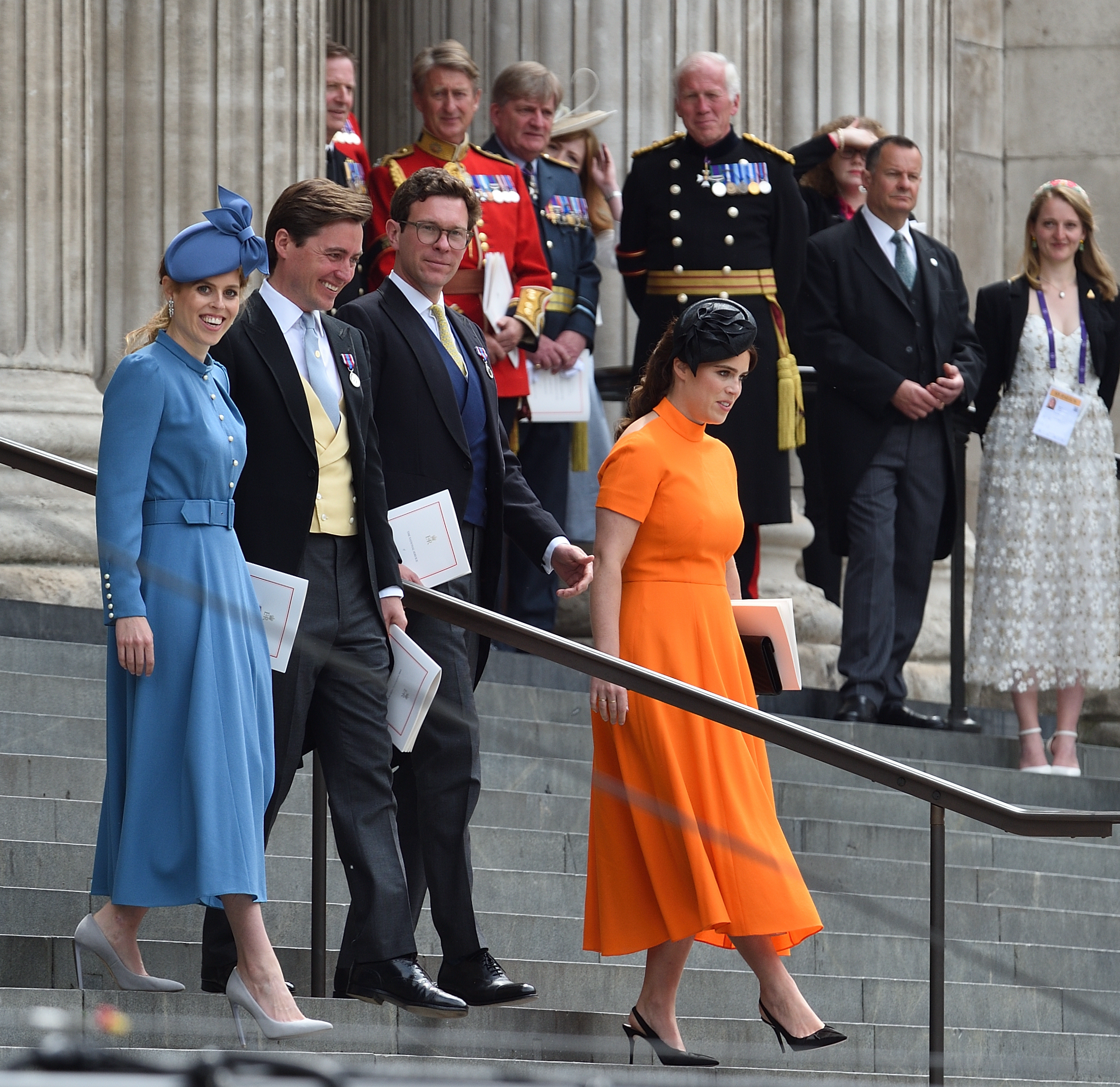
Eugenie and her husband, Jack Brooksbank, pictured with her sister, Princess Beatrice, and her brother-in-law, Edoardo Mapelli Mozzi, in 2022

Buckingham Palace announced Eugenie and Jack Brooksbank's engagement on 22 January 2018. The couple had been dating for seven years, having been introduced by friends during a ski break in Verbier, Switzerland, where Brooksbank was working. They became engaged while on holiday in Nicaragua. In April 2018, they moved from St James's Palace and took up residence in Ivy Cottage at Kensington Palace. The wedding took place at St George's Chapel, Windsor Castle, on 12 October 2018. Eugenie's wedding dress was designed by the British fashion designer Peter Pilotto and the Belgian Christopher de Vos of the British-based label Peter Pilotto, and was created to display the surgical scar on her back. She chose to reveal the scar to honour those who had supported her, and to inspire others living with scoliosis. For the evening reception, she wore a pair of diamond ear brooches that had been commissioned for Queen Adelaide by her husband, King William IV.

Eugenie and Brooksbank's first child, August Philip Hawke Brooksbank, was born on 9 February 2021 at the Portland Hospital in London and was delivered by caesarean section due to his mother's childhood scoliosis operation. At birth, he was 11th in line to the throne and is now 13th. He is named after his maternal 5x great-grandfather Prince Albert of Saxe-Coburg and Gotha, his maternal great-grandfather Prince Philip, Duke of Edinburgh, and his paternal 5x great-grandfather the Reverend Edward Hawke Brooksbank. August was christened at the Royal Chapel of All Saints, Windsor Great Park, on 21 November 2021, in a joint ceremony with his second cousin Lucas Tindall.

Their second child, Ernest George Ronnie Brooksbank, was born on 30 May 2023. At birth, he was 13th in line to the throne and is now 14th. He is named after his maternal 3x great-grandfather George V, his paternal grandfather, George Brooksbank, and his maternal great-grandfather, Ronald Ferguson.

Their third child, Adelaide Elizabeth Annina Brooksbank, was born on 3 August 2026 at a hospital in Lisbon, Portugal. She is 15th in line to the throne. Her first name is thought to reflect Queen Adelaide and Maria Adelaide of Portugal. Her middle name honours her great‑grandmother Queen Elizabeth II.

From November 2020 to May 2022, the couple's main residence was Frogmore Cottage, which had been leased to Eugenie's cousin Prince Harry. In May 2022, it was reported that they had moved to Portugal, where Brooksbank works for Michael Meldman, and that they would again stay at Ivy Cottage while in the UK. According to a report by the National Audit Office in June 2026, Eugenie has not personally paid rent on any royal properties she has lived in.

== Activities ==
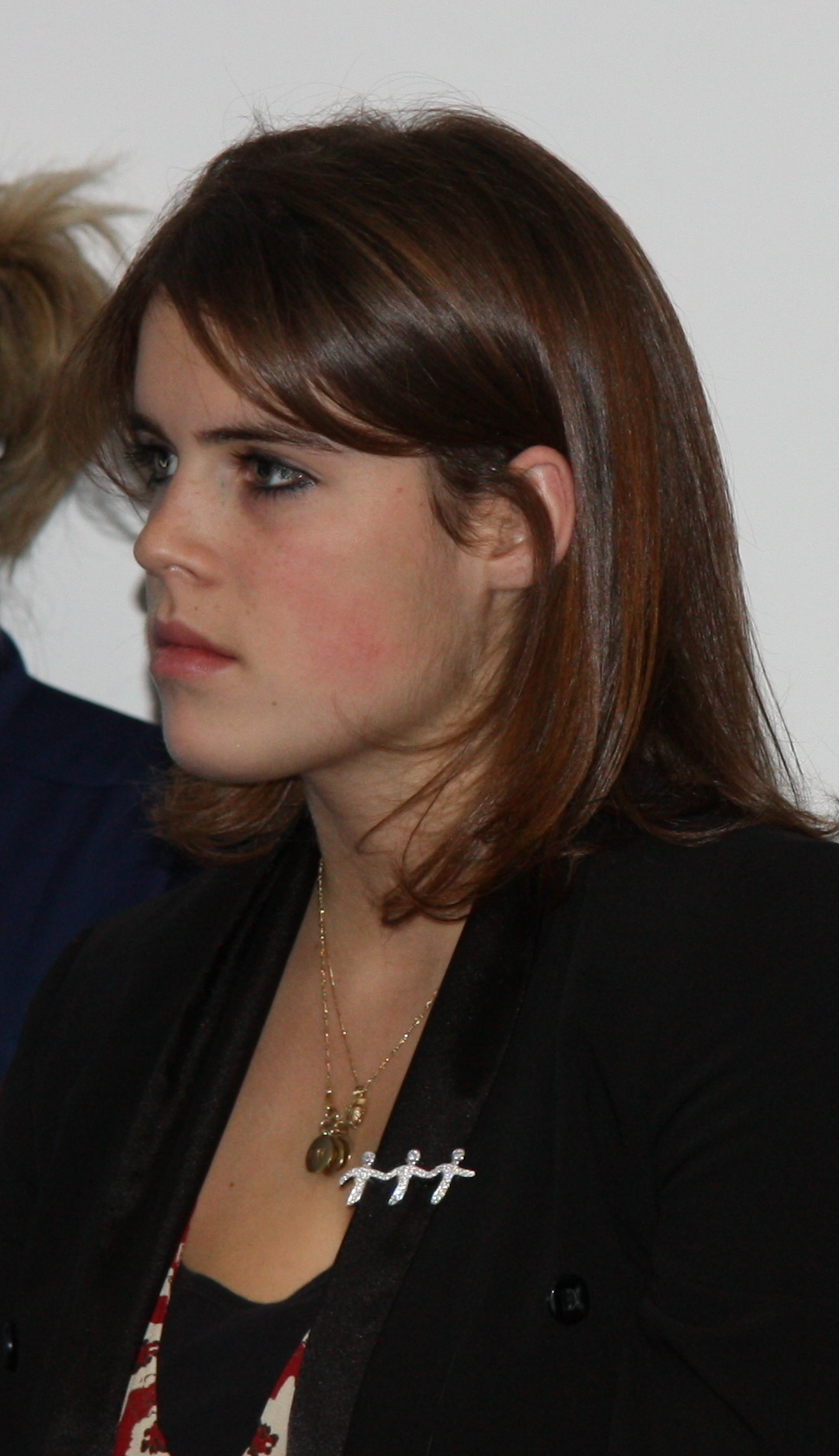
Eugenie at her first engagement, opening Teenage Cancer Trust's unit in Leeds, October 2008

Eugenie receives no allowance from the Privy Purse. She undertakes occasional public engagements, usually connected with the charities she supports, including the Teenage Cancer Trust and Children in Crisis. In 2018, Children in Crisis merged with Street Child, a children's charity active in multiple countries, with Eugenie continuing as an ambassador.

Eugenie and her sister represented their father at a service of thanksgiving for their aunt, Diana, Princess of Wales, in 2007. In 2008, she carried out her first solo public engagement, opening a Teenage Cancer Trust's unit for young cancer patients in Leeds.

On 2 June 2011, Eugenie visited the Royal National Orthopaedic Hospital (RNOH) with her father as one of her first official engagements. In April 2012, she agreed to become patron of the hospital's Redevelopment Appeal, which was her first patronage. In 2014, she re-opened the children's unit at the RNOH. Later that year, she partnered with Daisy London Jewellery to create a limited-edition charity bracelet in support of the RNOH's Appeal. Eugenie became patron of the RNOH Charity in March 2019. In the same year, she was named patron of Horatio's Garden, a charity that creates gardens for patients in NHS spinal injury centres.

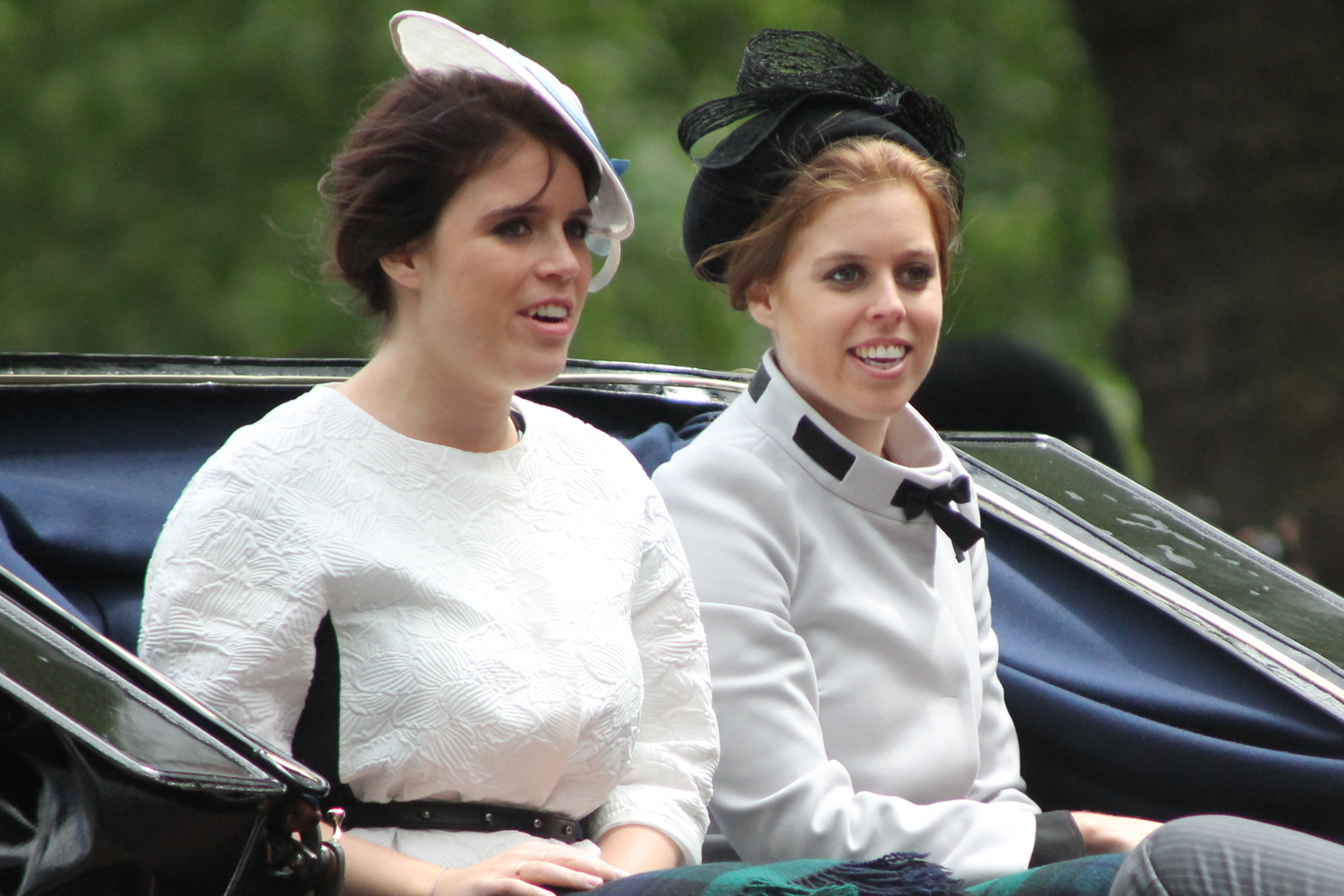
Eugenie (left) with her sister Beatrice at Trooping the Colour in 2013

In January 2013, Eugenie and her sister promoted Britain overseas in Germany. In 2016, Eugenie, together with her mother and sister, collaborated with the British contemporary artist Teddy McDonald on a painting titled Royal Love. Created at Royal Lodge and exhibited in London, the work was later sold with all proceeds donated by McDonald to Children in Crisis. Eugenie and her sister became Patrons of the Teenage Cancer Trust in June 2016. She is also Patron of the Coronet Theatre, the European School of Osteopathy, the Tate Young Patrons, and, alongside her mother, the Elephant Family, of which her uncle and aunt, King Charles III and Queen Camilla, are joint presidents. In 2016, Eugenie visited a safe house run by The Salvation Army and met with victims of sexual abuse and modern slavery.

In 2017, Eugenie became the ambassador for the Artemis Council of the New Museum, a by-invitation membership initiative focused on supporting female artists. She also became an ambassador for Project 0 in 2018, a charity which, in partnership with Sky Ocean Rescue, works to protect the ocean from plastic pollution. In July 2018, in her capacity as co-founder and director of the Anti-Slavery Collective, Eugenie spoke at the NEXUS Global Summit at the UN headquarters in New York to discuss efforts to end modern slavery. She and Julia de Boinville founded the collective in 2017 after a trip to Kolkata in 2012, where they first became familiar with the issue. In September 2018, she travelled to Serbia to visit ASTRA and ATINA, two grantees of the UN Trust Fund working to combat human trafficking and violence against women.

In August 2019, it was announced that she would launch a podcast, becoming the first member of the royal family to do so. Together with Julia de Boinville, she highlighted and discussed issues related to modern slavery. The first episode of the podcast, titled Floodlight, was released in April 2022. In July 2019, with support from the University of Hull's Wilberforce Institute, Eugenie hosted an event at Westminster Abbey to examine the scale of modern slavery. From 2019 until 2026, she was patron of Anti-Slavery International. In April 2019, she accompanied her grandmother to the Royal Maundy service at St George's Chapel, Windsor Castle.

In May 2020, it was reported that Eugenie and her husband were assisting The Salvation Army with packing food parcels during the COVID-19 pandemic. In October 2020, she became patron of the Scoliosis Association UK. In June 2021, she became an ambassador for the Blue Marine Foundation and met with environmentalists at Somerset House. In October 2021, as part of her work with the Anti‑Slavery Collective, she visited The Salvation Army's outreach hub and took part in an art‑therapy session with survivors of modern slavery. In June 2022, she launched the Ocean Advocate Series, featuring conversations with ocean advocates and experts on preserving the seas and the wider environment.

On 17 September 2022, during the period of official mourning for Queen Elizabeth II, Eugenie joined her sister and six cousins in mounting a 15-minute vigil around the late Queen's coffin as it lay in state at Westminster Hall. On 19 September, she joined other members of the royal family at the state funeral.

== Titles, styles and arms ==
=== Titles and styles ===
Royal monogram

As a male-line grandchild of the sovereign, Eugenie was known as "Her Royal Highness Princess Eugenie of York", with the territorial designation derived from her father's then-title, Duke of York. Since her marriage, she has been styled "Her Royal Highness Princess Eugenie, Mrs Jack Brooksbank" in the Court Circular.

=== Arms ===
Coat of arms of Princess Eugenie
Notes The Princess's personal coat of arms is the lozenge of the arms of the sovereign in right of the United Kingdom, with a label for difference. Adopted 5 July 2008 Coronet Coronet of a male-line grandchild of the sovereign. Escutcheon Quarterly 1st and 4th gules three lions passant guardant in pale Or 2nd Or a lion rampant gules within a double tressure flory counterflory gules 3rd azure a harp Or stringed argent. The whole differenced by a label of five points argent, the first, third and fifth points charged with a Scottish thistle. Supporters Dexter a lion rampant gardant Or imperially crowned proper, sinister a unicorn argent, armed, craned and unguled Or, gorged with a coronet Or composed of crosses patée and fleurs de lis a chain affixed thereto passing between the forelegs and reflexed over the back also Or. Banner The Princess's personal standard is that of the sovereign in right of the United Kingdom, labelled for difference as in her arms. (in Scotland) Symbolism As with the Royal Arms of the United Kingdom. The first and third quarters are the arms of England, the second of Scotland, the fourth of Ireland. The use of thistles in her Arms continues the trend in royal heraldry (cf. the Arms of William, Prince of Wales) of using charges from the maternal line, as her mother's coat of arms has a thistle as the main charge.

== Authored articles ==
- HRH Princess Eugenie (4 June 2022). "I hope my son will inherit the Queen's kindness". The Spectator.

== Footnotes ==
Princess Eugenie House of Windsor Born: 23 March 1990
Lines of succession
Preceded by Athena Mapelli Mozzi	Succession to the British throne 12th in line	Followed by August Brooksbank
Orders of precedence in the United Kingdom
Preceded by Princess Beatrice	Ladies; HRH Princess Eugenie, Mrs Jack Brooksbank	Followed by Lady Louise Mountbatten-Windsor
