= Dana Smith =

Dana Smith may refer to:

- Dana Shell Smith, American diplomat
- Dana Smith, a character from Robert Muchamore's CHERUB book series
