= Cindy Crawford =

American model and actress (born 1966)

- Crawford in 2026
- Born: Cynthia Ann Crawford; February 20, 1966 (age 60); DeKalb, Illinois, U.S.
- Occupations: Model; actress; television personality
- Years active: 1983−present
- Spouses: Richard Gere (m. 1991; div. 1995) Rande Gerber (m. 1998)
- Children: Presley Gerber; Kaia Gerber
- Modeling information
- Height: 5 ft 9 1/2 in (1.77 m)
- Hair color: Brown
- Eye color: Brown
- Agency: Storm Management (London)
- Website: cindy.com

Cynthia Ann Crawford (born February 20, 1966) is an American model, actress, and television personality. One of the most popular supermodels of the 1980s and 1990s, she achieved a ubiquitous presence on magazine covers, runways, and fashion campaigns. She subsequently expanded into acting and business ventures.

== Early life ==
Crawford was born in DeKalb, Illinois, on February 20, 1966, the daughter of Daniel Kenneth Crawford and Jennifer Sue Crawford-Moluf (née Walker). She has two sisters, Chris and Danielle, and a brother, Jeffery, who died of childhood leukemia at age 3.

On social media, she stated that her family had been in the United States for generations and that her ancestry is mostly German, English and French. She is a descendant of English Puritan settler Thomas Trowbridge, who helped establish the Congregational Church in New Haven. She was raised in the Congregationalist faith and found it "incredible" that religious values "trickled down" to her family. According to official census records, Crawford's paternal great-grandfather David Crawford was of Scottish ancestry from Northern Ireland, who in 1904 settled in Wisconsin. Appearing in an episode of Who Do You Think You Are? in 2013, she discovered that her ancestors included European nobility and that she is descended from Charlemagne.

In her sophomore year at high school, she received a call from a local clothing store regarding modeling work, only to discover it was a prank by two of her classmates. However, the following year, another store hired a number of high school girls, including Crawford, to work for them (including a fashion shoot). In her junior year, local photographer Roger Legel, whose duties included photographing a different college girl to be that week's coed in the DeKalb Nite Weekly, asked to take her picture for the publication; the result was Crawford's first cover. The photo and positive feedback she received were enough to convince her to take up modeling. Initially, she worked with a small agency, which was sold to Elite Model Management shortly after she signed. In 1983, she entered Elite's Look of the Year contest at 17 and made the national finals.

Crawford graduated from DeKalb High School in 1984 as valedictorian. She earned an academic scholarship to study chemical engineering at Northwestern University, which she attended for only one quarter before dropping out to pursue a full-time modeling career. After working for photographer Victor Skrebneski in Chicago, she moved to New York City in 1986 and signed with the Elite New York modeling agency.

== Career ==
In 1987, Crawford appeared in the opening credits of the Michael J. Fox film The Secret of My Success. Three years later, she was featured alongside top models Christy Turlington, Linda Evangelista, Tatjana Patitz and Naomi Campbell on the cover of the January 1990 edition of British Vogue. Crawford and the other four models subsequently appeared in the video for George Michael's hit "Freedom! '90" later that year. Subsequently, Crawford played the lost love of Jon Bon Jovi in the 1994 video for his version of "Please Come Home For Christmas", "John Taylor" in the 2011 video for Duran Duran's "Girl Panic" (featuring supermodels as the band, including Naomi Campbell as Simon Le Bon), and Headmistress in the 2015 video for Taylor Swift's "Bad Blood" as part of a cast including Jessica Alba, Selena Gomez, and fellow models Lily Aldridge, Cara Delevingne, Gigi Hadid, Martha Hunt and Karlie Kloss.

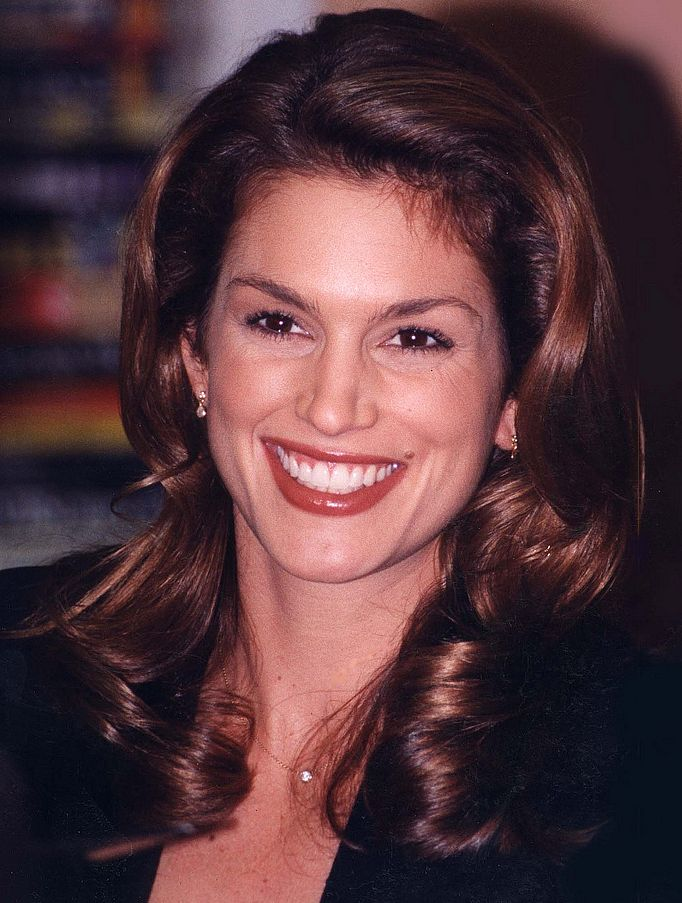
Crawford in 1995

She was frequently featured on the cover of multiple fashion and lifestyle magazines, including Vogue, W, People, Harper's Bazaar, Elle, Cosmopolitan, and Allure. A partial count in 1998 totalled over 500 appearances. Crawford has walked the runway shows for Chanel, Versace, Dolce & Gabbana, Christian Dior, Calvin Klein, Ralph Lauren, Roberto Cavalli, Michael Kors, Thierry Mugler, Todd Oldham, DKNY and Valentino. Crawford also appeared in many fashion campaigns during her career, including those for Versace, Calvin Klein, Escada, David Yurman, Oscar De La Renta, Balmain, Hermes, Ellen Tracy, Valentino, Bally, Liz Claiborne, Hervé Leger, Halston, Anne Klein, Isaac Mizrahi, Blumarine, Guess, Ink, Gap and Revlon. She has also worked for Omega, Maybelline, Clairol, Pepsi, and Chilean retail stores Ripley (partner of Macy's).

In July 1988, she posed nude for Playboy magazine in a shoot by photographer Herb Ritts. In October 1998, Crawford returned to the pages of Playboy for a second nude pictorial, again taken by Ritts. She was ranked number 5 on Playboy's list of the 100 sexiest stars of the 20th century. A 1997 Shape magazine survey of 4,000 picked her as the second (after Demi Moore) most beautiful woman in the world. In 2002, Crawford was named one of the 50 most beautiful people by People magazine. In her forties, she claimed No. 26 in the 2006 Hot 100 issue of Maxim magazine. She was named No. 3 on VH1's 40 Hottest Hotties of the 90s and was named one of the "100 Hottest Women of All-Time" by Men's Health.

The red Versace dress she wore to the 63rd Academy Awards in 1991 had a major influence on fashion, and many copies and fakes of the dress were produced. In 1992, Crawford—through GoodTimes Home Video and her company Crawdaddy Productions—made an exercise video with Radu Teodorescu named Cindy Crawford: Shape Your Body; although criticised by some for being unsafe, it was hugely successful and led to two equally lucrative followups, Cindy Crawford: The Next Challenge in 1993 (again with Radu) and Cindy Crawford: A New Dimension in 2000; the latter, made with fitness expert Kathy Kaehler and produced not long after Crawford gave birth to her first child, was aimed at new mothers getting back into shape. In 2001, Crawford also made a shorter fitness video aimed at children, Mini-Muscles with Cindy Crawford and the Fit-wits, an animated production featuring the voices of Crawford (who also appears at the beginning in live action), Radu and Kobe Bryant.

The inaugural issue of George, a short lived political magazine in the 1990s, featured Crawford dressed like George Washington on the cover. In 2005, the American Society of Magazine Editors listed it as the 22nd best magazine cover of the last 40 years.

Crawford has also been on TV and in films. From 1989 to 1995, Crawford was host and executive producer of MTV's House of Style. In the early 1990s, Crawford starred in the Pepsi and Pepsi Stuff advertising. In 1992, she appeared in Pepsi's Super Bowl commercial, aired during Super Bowl XXVI. In 2016, Pepsi released a remake of the commercial, also featuring Crawford. In 1995, Crawford broke into movies as the female lead in the movie Fair Game. Her performance was panned by critics—Leonard Maltin commented "In her acting debut, supermodel Crawford makes a good jogger." The film was also a financial failure, with expenses of $50 million and $11 million takings at the box office. In 2001, she costarred as part of an ensemble cast in The Simian Line. Again the film was not successful or critically acclaimed, but Crawford's acting was not criticized. She has had many lesser roles guest starring on TV and as supporting roles, often playing herself. For example, in 2000, she was one of the celebrities (along with Victoria Silvstedt, Anna Falchi and Megan Gale) playing themselves in the Italian comedy Body Guards – Guardie del corpo. In the 1990s, Carol Shaw, her make-up artist, named a lipstick color after Crawford as a part of the Lorac Cosmetics lip-wear line.

In the late 1990s, she made a number of appearances in magician David Copperfield's stage shows, standing in for her fellow supermodel Claudia Schiffer as Copperfield's guest assistant. During these appearances, she took part in a number of different illusions including being levitated, guillotined, and sawn in half in Copperfield's Clearly Impossible illusion. On a number of occasions, she joined Copperfield and Schiffer in a performance of the Double Sawing illusion in which both women were sawn in half and then reassembled with their lower halves swapped.

=== After modelling ===
Crawford quit full-time modeling in 2000 and now appears only occasionally in fashion magazines. In 2005, Crawford created a line of beauty products with Jean-Louis Sebagh called Meaningful Beauty for Guthy-Renker. Crawford has stated that she regularly receives certain cosmetic procedures, including Botox and vitamin injections. She first saw a plastic surgeon at the age of 29.

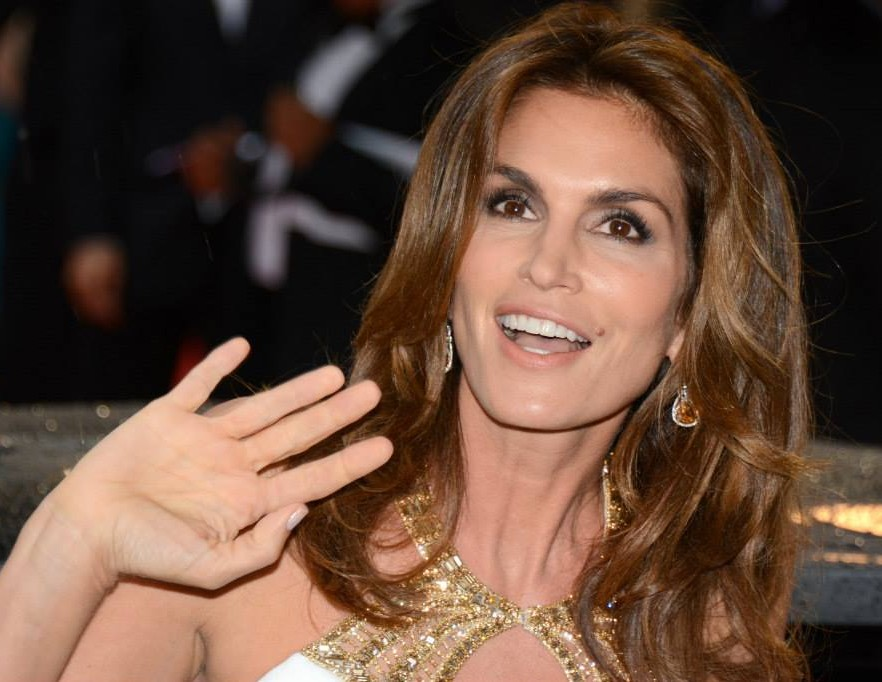
Crawford at the 2013 Cannes Film Festival

In 2005, Crawford launched a new line of furniture under the "Cindy Crawford Home Collection" name. The collection is manufactured by HM Richards Inc. She assisted in the creation of the line by consulting on the features, colors, or styles that fit the needs of families or reflected her own tastes. She also has a furniture line with Rooms to Go, Raymour & Flanigan and launched a home goods line with J. C. Penney in late 2009.

In 2009, Crawford was one of many celebrities to be photographed by Deborah Anderson for the coffee table book Room 23, produced by philanthropist Diana Jenkins. In addition to appearing in the book, Crawford was the cover model and wrote the dedication. Becoming, a book about Crawford's life and career co-written by Crawford and Katherine O'Leary, was published in September 2015.

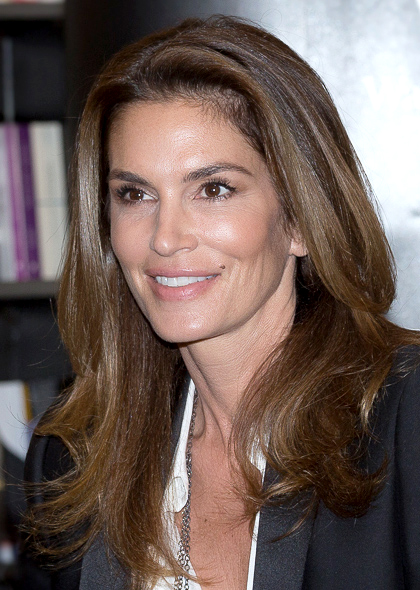
Crawford in 2015

Crawford appeared on the American version of Lip Sync Battle reenacting her performance in the bathtub from the George Michael music for "Freedom! '90", performed by actor Zachary Quinto.

Crawford and her daughter Kaia appeared together on the cover of the April 2016 issue of Vogue Paris. In 2016, she became a spokesperson for Acqua Minerale San Benedetto in Italy. In September 2017, Crawford, along with models Claudia Schiffer, Naomi Campbell, Helena Christensen and Carla Bruni, closed the Versace spring/summer 2018 fashion show, which was an homage to the late Gianni Versace.

In January 2019, Crawford, along with her husband Rande Gerber, Michael Meldman, Jeff Shell and Jay Sures announced they would purchase the Hollywood deli Nate 'n Al to keep its doors open after three generations of family ownership.

Crawford was featured in a four-part Apple TV+ docuseries titled The Super Models, which premiered on September 20, 2023. The series also featured Naomi Campbell, Christy Turlington and Linda Evangelista and was directed by Roger Ross Williams and Larissa Bills.

== Personal life ==
Crawford was married to actor Richard Gere from 1991 until their divorce in 1995. She married businessman and former model Rande Gerber on May 29, 1998. They had two children, Presley (1999–2026) and Kaia (born 2001).

In August 2021, the couple sold their home in Trousdale Estates, Beverly Hills, for a reported $13.5 million.

=== Style and appearance ===
Crawford is 5 feet 9 1/2 inches (1.77 m) tall with brown hair and eyes. Her measurements are 34–25.5–36. Her trademark is a mole (or "beauty mark") above her upper lip. She appeared in an Australian advertising campaign in the 1990s for flavoured milk featuring a TV commercial wherein she "licked off" her own mole. In her early years of modelling, her resemblance to model Gia Carangi led to her being called "Baby Gia".

== Advocacy and charity work ==
When Crawford was 10 years old, her three-year-old brother Jeff—whom she continues to praise as "the fourth most influential person in [her] life"—died of leukemia. Since becoming a model, Crawford has made childhood leukemia a focal point of her charity work, donating proceeds of her calendars to medical research. Crawford has been a long-time supporter of the pediatric oncology program at the University of Wisconsin–Madison, where Jeff was treated, stating that she believes he received the best care possible. She is also an honorary board member of the Multiple Myeloma Research Foundation.

In 2007, she became an official supporter of the Ronald McDonald House Charities and is a member of their celebrity board, called the Friends of RMHC. Crawford is on the honorary committee of the California Wildlife Center.

In 2021, Crawford recreated her famous Pepsi ad with photographer David Yarrow to help raise funds for the American family Children's Hospital in Madison, Wisconsin where her brother, Jeff, was treated for leukemia.

=== Political endorsements ===
In 2008, Crawford endorsed Barack Obama for President of the United States. Despite reports, Crawford denied endorsing Mitt Romney for the 2012 election.

== Filmography ==
=== Films ===
Year	Title	Role
1987	The Secret of My Success	Model in opening montage, uncredited
1995	Unzipped	Herself
1995	Catwalk	Herself
1995	Fair Game	Kate McQueen
1998	54	VIP Patron
1998	Beautopia	Herself
2000	Body Guards – Guardie del corpo	Herself and her double
2001	The Simian Line	Sandra

=== Videos ===
==== Fitness videos ====
Year	Title
1992	Cindy Crawford: Shape Your Body Workout
1993	Cindy Crawford: The Next Challenge Workout
2000	Cindy Crawford: A New Dimension
2001	Mini-Muscles with Cindy Crawford and the Fit-wits

==== Music videos ====
Year	Title	Artist	Notes
1990	"Freedom! '90"	George Michael	
1991	"Voices That Care"	Voices That Care	Part of the choir
1994	"Please Come Home for Christmas"	Jon Bon Jovi	As Jon Bon Jovi's girlfriend
2011	"Girl Panic!"	Duran Duran	As John Taylor
2015	"Bad Blood"	Taylor Swift	As Headmistress
2023	"One Margarita (Saucy Remix)"	That Chick Angel	As herself, recreating her 1992 Pepsi ad

=== Television ===
Year	Title	Role	Notes
1989–1995	MTV's House of Style	Host	
1996	Muppets Tonight	Herself	Episode: "Episode 5"
1997	Frasier	Dorothy (voice only)	Episode: "Halloween"
1998	3rd Rock from the Sun	Masha, one of the invading Venusians	Episode: "36! 24! 36! Dick!"
1998	Elmopalooza	Herself	Cameo
1998	The Secret World of... Supermodels		June 16, 1999 The Man Show "Bathroom Talk, with Cindy Crawford".
1998	Sex with Cindy Crawford	Host	Television special
2002	According to Jim	Gretchen Saunders, manager of a car dealership	Episode: "Cars & Chicks"
2004	Headliners and Legends: Cindy Crawford		
2007	Sunrise		
2009	Wizards of Waverly Place	Bibi Rockford	Episode: "Fashion Week"
2013	Who Do You Think You Are?	Herself	Season 4, Episode 6
2015	Cougar Town	Herself	Episode: "Yer So Bad"
2015	The Hospital in the Sky	Herself	Narrator
2016	Lip Sync Battle	Herself	Episode: "Zoe Saldana vs. Zachary Quinto"
2019	BoJack Horseman	Cindy Crawfish	Episode: "A Horse Walks into Rehab"
2021	Friends: The Reunion	Herself	Television special
2022	Pepsi, Where's My Jet?	Herself	
2023	The Super Models	Herself	Also executive producer
