= Jeff Shell =

American media executive (born 1965)

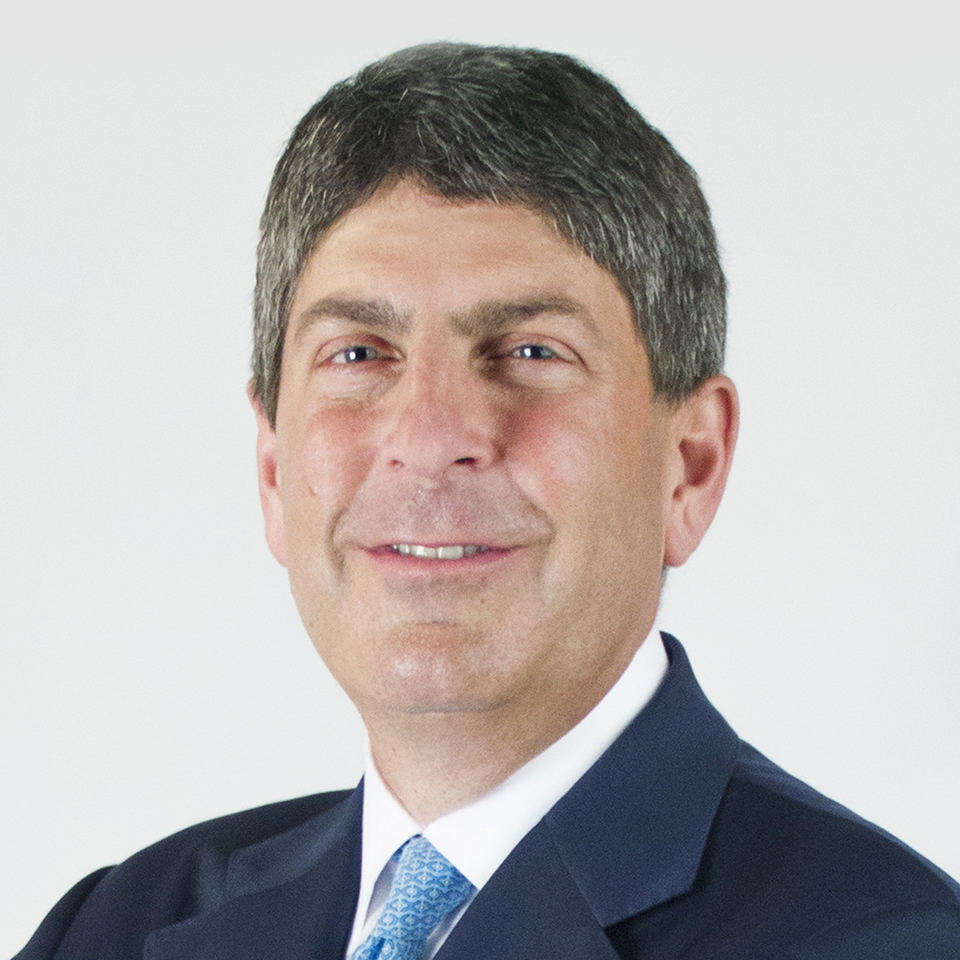
- Shell in 2013
- Born: October 6, 1965 (age 61); Ann Arbor, Michigan, U.S.
- Education: University of California, Berkeley (BS); Harvard University (MBA)
- Occupation: Media executive
- Title: President, Paramount Skydance (2025–2026); CEO, Universal Filmed Entertainment Group (2013–2019); CEO, NBCUniversal (2019–2023)
- Spouse: Laura Shell (m. 1999)
- Relatives: Dana Shell Smith (sister)

Jeff Shell (born October 6, 1965) is an American media executive who served as president of Paramount Skydance Corporation from August 2025 to April 2026.

== Career ==
Shell is a graduate of the University of California, Berkeley, where he studied economics and applied mathematics, and Harvard Business School, where he received an MBA.

He worked in Salomon Brothers as a analyst from 1987 to 1991. In 1990, Shell worked in PepsiCo. The next year he joined The Walt Disney Company to work as a senior analyst and manager, position Shell held up until 1994. By 1994 he moved to Fox Television, where Shell became a vice president in business development department. In following years, Shell worked in Fox\Liberty Networks (senior vice president of finance department, chief financial officer), Fox Sports Networks (president) and Fox Cable Networks Group (chief executive ofiicer).

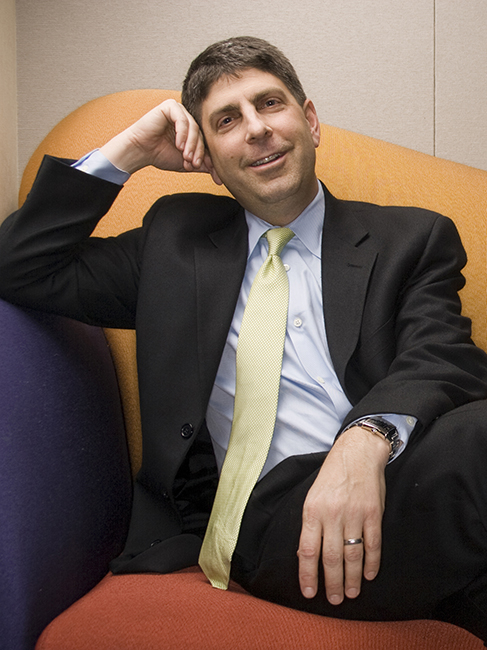
Shell in 2006

In 2001, Shell joined Comcast in 2004, where he was president of Comcast Programming Group. In September 2013, Shell became the chairman of Universal Filmed Entertainment Group. In 2019, it was announced that he would succeed Steve Burke as CEO of NBCUniversal. Shell assumed the role on January 1, 2020, and reported directly to Comcast CEO Brian L. Roberts. In April 2008, Shell signed an open letter endorsing Barack Obama for the Pennsylvania primary. He was named by President Barack Obama as chairman of the Broadcasting Board of Governors replacing Sony Pictures executive Michael Lynton.

In May 2020, The New York Times reported that Shell was considering replacing CNBC's current primetime offerings of business reality shows with right-wing talk shows, in a bid to appeal to conservative viewers.

=== Firing from NBCUniversal ===
On April 23, 2023, Shell was fired from NBCUniversal after an investigation into sexual harassment, which began when a female employee filed a complaint against him. Shell had an extramarital affair with the employee from 2012 to 2021, who was subsequently identified as CNBC reporter Hadley Gamble. Variety reported that the law firm Gibson Dunn was hired to conduct the investigation, and corroborated the complaint after reviewing records of Shell and Gamble's email communications. Shell was then dismissed with cause, and did not receive any severance pay.

=== 60 Minutes controversy ===
Allegedly, Shell held a meeting in October 2024 while presidential candidate Donald Trump was making claims that the CBS news program 60 Minutes had "deceptively edited" an interview with presidential candidate Kamala Harris to benefit his Democratic challenger.

Shell allegedly pressured the CBS News brass to release the 60 Minutes transcript ahead of his company's merger with the network's parent Paramount Global, but CBS News president Wendy McMahon and executive producer Bill Owens pushed back, persuading Shell that folding under political pressure would be a bad move.

The case is currently before a mediator, who is facilitating discussions between both sides about a possible settlement. Staffers at the network have voiced their concerns over the matter, citing journalistic integrity, and Federal Communications Commission chief Brendan Carr has opened a probe into the Harris edit and opened it up for public comment.

=== President of Paramount Skydance ===
On July 7, 2024, Paramount's board approved the deal to merge with Skydance. David Ellison became chairman and CEO of the combined company with Shell as president. On March 9, 2026, Jeff Shell was sued for $150M by R.J. Cipriani, a man claiming that Shell refused to help him produce a television series (entitled, Star Serenade), shared non-public information about the Paramount/Warner Bros merger, as well as for failing to pay Cipriani for crisis communications services.

On April 8, 2026, as a result of the lawsuit by Cipriani, Shell departed from Paramount Skydance.

On April 14, 2026, Hollywood mogul Ari Emanuel was hit with a subpoena in the RJ Cipriani–Jeff Shell civil case. Cipriani’s attorneys are calling for the WME and TKO chief to appear for a deposition lasting up to seven hours on May 19 at their Beverly Hills law offices.

== Personal life ==
Shell is married to Laura Fay Shell, who worked for Los Angeles County Supervisor Zev Yaroslavsky as his planning deputy until 2005. His sister is Dana Shell Smith, and his brother is Dan Shell of IMG College.

In 2015, he was awarded the Dorothy and Sherrill C. Corwin Human Relations Award by the American Jewish Committee. Shell is a 2010 inductee into the Southern California Jewish Sports Hall of Fame.

In January 2019, Shell, along with Cindy Crawford, her husband Rande Gerber, Michael Meldman, and Jay Sures, announced they would purchase the Beverly Hills deli, Nate 'n Al, to keep its doors open after three generations of family ownership.

Business positions
Preceded by Steve Burke	CEO of NBCUniversal; 2020-2023	Succeeded by Michael J. Cavanagh
