= Presley Gerber =

American model (1999–2026)

- Gerber in 2026
- Born: Presley Walker Gerber; July 2, 1999; Brentwood, Los Angeles, California, U.S.
- Died: September 20, 2026 (aged 27); Santa Monica, California, U.S.
- Education: Malibu High School
- Years active: 2015–2026
- Height: 6 ft (1.83 m)
- Parents: Cindy Crawford; Rande Gerber
- Relatives: Kaia Gerber (sister)

Presley Walker Gerber (July 2, 1999 – September 20, 2026) was an American model. He was the elder child of Cindy Crawford and Rande Gerber and the brother of model and actress Kaia Gerber.

He began modeling as a teenager and later appeared in runway shows and advertising campaigns for several major fashion brands. He also spoke publicly about his experiences with mental health and addiction.

== Early life and education ==
Presley Walker Gerber was born in a home birth on July 2, 1999, in Brentwood, Los Angeles, California, U.S., the first child and only son of supermodel Cindy Crawford and businessman Rande Gerber. He had one sibling, a younger sister, Kaia. Gerber graduated from Malibu High School in 2017.

His parents said the name Presley came from a dinner with record producer David Foster, who was then married to Linda Thompson, formerly Elvis Presley's girlfriend. They recalled Foster asking, "Can you imagine being me, having to follow Presley?" and that the name stuck.

== Career ==
Gerber began modeling at age 15, appearing alongside his sister and model Garrett Taber in a CR Fashion Book editorial shot in May 2015. He subsequently signed with IMG Models in July 2015, and made his runway debut for Moschino in June 2016, at age 16. He walked for Burberry, Dolce & Gabbana, Bottega Veneta, Tommy Hilfiger and Ralph Lauren, and appeared in a Super Bowl advertisement for Pepsi with his mother in 2018. He also worked on campaigns for Calvin Klein, Celine and Omega.

In 2017, he won the Reader's Choice Breakout Star men's category in Models.com's Model of the Year awards. He had previously been nominated for the Celebrity as Model men's category in 2016, and was subsequently nominated for the Model of the Year men's category in 2018.

In 2017, Gerber had a role in the music video for Madison Beer's song "Dead". In 2024, he appeared as himself in the eighth episode of the reality‑sports show The Wager, where Gerber and his father were challenged by Jason Kennedy and Wes Burrows.

== Personal life and death ==
In January 2019, Gerber was arrested and charged with driving under the influence (DUI). He received three years' probation and was required to complete a DUI program and two days of community service.

In 2020, he tattooed his face with the word "misunderstood" under his eye, which led to viral controversy. Gerber compared the negative comments to transphobia in a later post. According to People, he had removed it by August 2021.

In 2023, Gerber discussed his experiences with mental health on the Studio 22 podcast. He said he had dealt with depression and related issues, and added that "whether I help one person or a hundred people get out of that place ... that's all I need to do." On the podcast, he also mentioned considering a mental health‑focused clothing line. The same year, Gerber began an Instagram series called "Mental Health Mondays", where he discussed his experiences with depression and addiction. On the series, he said he first saw a psychiatrist at around 13 and began taking Xanax at 16, which initially helped before he started to worry about its long‑term effects. He said he knew what dependence and addiction were but did not realise he was moving in that direction. He described being treated with several medications over the years, including Prozac at 14 for anxiety and panic attacks. Gerber said he first went to rehab in his late teens, where he was given trazodone, an antidepressant that he said left him feeling numb. He was prescribed other drugs during multiple rehab stays, the first at 18 or 19, and mentioned using ketamine and kratom to manage withdrawal symptoms. He also recalled taking Valium, Adderall and buprenorphine before becoming dissatisfied with medication and traditional rehab programs.

In March 2026, he posted a video showing him preparing for a "pre‑ibogaine flood dose" in Cancun, Mexico. In June 2026, Gerber took part in a mental-health event in Malibu. He spoke about his experiences with mental health, including a turning point at age 23 and the pressures of growing up in the public eye, and said he felt more free after being open about what he had gone through.

Gerber died of a suspected drug overdose at Resolutions Living, a rehabilitation facility in Santa Monica, California, on September 20, 2026, the day after he arrived. He was 27.

== See also ==
- Deaths in September 2026
