= The Anti-Slavery Collective =

United Kingdom-based charity

- Formation: 2017; 9 years ago
- Founder: Princess Eugenie; Julia de Boinville
- Type: Charity
- Purpose: End modern slavery through awareness
- Location(s): 5 Brayford Square London E10 SG
- Region served: United Kingdom
- Website: www.theantislaverycollective.org

The Anti-Slavery Collective (ASC) is a United Kingdom-based charity launched in 2017 by Princess Eugenie and Julia de Boinville.

== History ==
The Anti-Slavery Collective (ASC) was co‑founded in 2017 by Princess Eugenie and her friend Julia de Boinville, following a visit to India in 2012 where they saw survivors of modern slavery for the first time. Eugenie recounted that during that trip she and de Boinville met a group of teenage girls rescued from exploitation, calling their story "heartbreaking but also deeply inspiring". They said they spent several years doing research, meeting experts and learning more before formally launching the charity in 2017.

The Anti‑Slavery Collective's focus centres on raising awareness of hidden forms of exploitation—particularly the ways in which worker‑exploitation, trafficking and forced labour intersect with global supply chains and counterfeit markets. In April 2022 Eugenie and de Boinville launched the podcast Floodlight, where until December 2023 they interviewed survivors, activists, corporate leaders and legislators about modern slavery and what individuals could do. In November 2023 they held their inaugural "Force for Freedom" gala in London, bringing together survivors, fashion figures and influencers, integrating survivor testimony throughout the event, and raising over $1 million in support of their mission. The organisation raised £1.5 million in donations in 2024, followed by £48,000 in the year ending 2025. In September 2025, Eugenie launched ASC's "Hidden Threads: Fake Fashion – A Human Rights Scandal" campaign, which addressed how fake designer goods and sports jerseys often link to forced labour and child labour in illicit networks. The organisation openly urged governments, businesses and consumers to take the "underground world of counterfeiting" seriously as a modern‐slavery issue and placed emphasis on the "hidden cost" behind what was bought.

In May 2026, the Charity Commission announced that it had opened a regulatory compliance case into the charity.
