= Kaia Gerber =

American model and actress (born 2001)

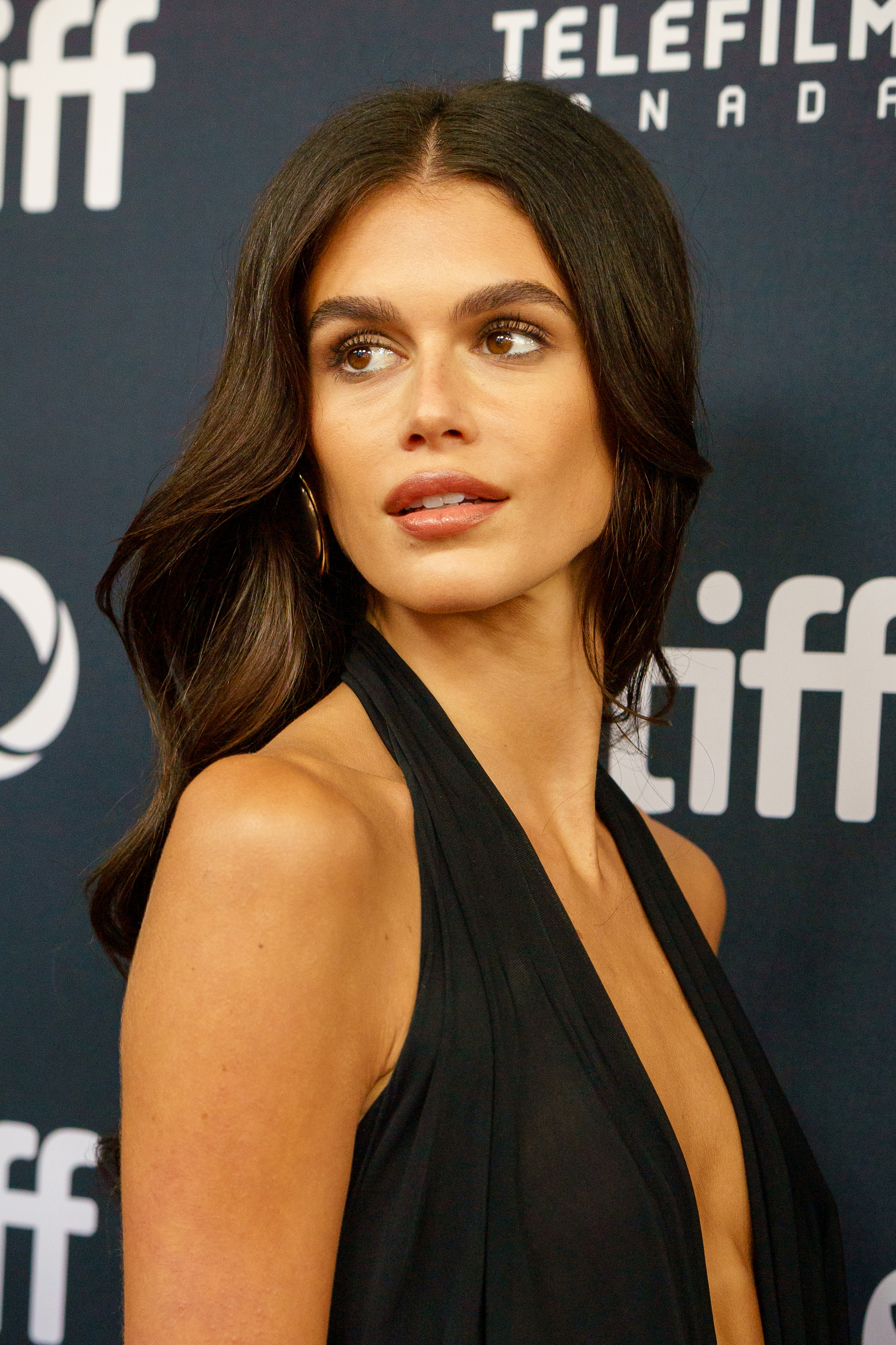
- Gerber at the 2024 Toronto International Film Festival
- Born: Kaia Jordan Gerber; September 3, 2001 (age 25); Los Angeles, California, U.S.
- Occupations: Model; actress
- Years active: 2014–present
- Parents: Cindy Crawford; Rande Gerber
- Relatives: Presley Gerber (brother)
- Modeling information
- Height: 5 ft 9 1/2 in (1.77 m)
- Hair color: Brown
- Eye color: Brown
- Agency: DNA Model Management (New York); VIVA Model Management (Paris, London, Milan)

Kaia Jordan Gerber (born September 3, 2001) is an American model and actress. After starring in a series of ad campaigns for fashion brands since debuting at Fashion Week in 2017, Gerber won Model of the Year at the British Fashion Awards in 2018. As an actress, she has appeared in supporting roles in the films Bottoms (2023) and Saturday Night (2024), and starred in a lead role in the FX series The Shards. She is the second child and only daughter of supermodel Cindy Crawford and businessman Rande Gerber.

== Early life ==
Kaia Jordan Gerber was born on September 3, 2001, in Los Angeles, California. She is the younger of two children born to the supermodel Cindy Crawford and the businessman Rande Gerber. She had an elder brother, Presley (1999–2026).

Her mother, who is of German, English, French, and Danish ancestry, is a Congregationalist Christian, and her father is an American Jew of Ashkenazi Jewish descent. In a 2018 interview, she stated "my dad is Jewish and my mom is Christian so we grew up doing both; we call it Chrismukah. I love learning about both of those sides of my life. We'd do Passover, Passover dinner and Yom Kippur. I love learning all of that, and learning the cooking." Through her mother, she is a descendant of English Puritan settler Thomas Trowbridge, who helped establish the Congregational Church in New Haven.

== Career ==
=== 2012–2018: Early work ===
When she was 10, Gerber landed her first modeling gig with Versace's junior line, Young Versace. She took online classes at Malibu High School. She was part of the Young Versace S/S 12 campaign when she was only 10 years old. Gerber made her acting debut at 15 in Sister Cities as the young version of Carolina. In July 2015, she signed under IMG models.

Gerber appeared on the covers of Vogue Paris, Vogue Netherland, and Vogue India along with her mother in 2016. In 2016, Gerber was also part of the Marc Jacobs "Daisy" fragrance advertisement and beauty fall campaign. Gerber was also part of the Alexander Wang's S/S 16 campaign, and Chrome Hearts S/S 16 campaign. In 2017, Gerber appeared on the Teen Vogue Fall 2017 edition. In February 2018, Gerber appeared on the cover of Vogue Paris, in July 2018 on the cover of Vogue Italia and on October in the cover of Vogue Paris.

Gerber made her runway debut for Raf Simons' Calvin Klein Collection at 16 years old and walked for fashion houses such as Marc Jacobs, Burberry, Alexander Wang, Coach, Prada, Chanel, Fendi, Miu Miu, Max Mara, Givenchy, Bottega Veneta, Stella McCartney, Isabel Marant, Alberta Ferretti, Loewe, Chloé, Sacai, Michael Kors, Moncler, JW. Anderson, Longchamp, Tom Ford, Salvatore Ferragamo, Ports1961, Lanvin, Anna Sui, Moschino, Saint Laurent, Alexander McQueen, Valentino, and Versace, alongside her mother, during 2018 Spring Fashion Week. Gerber rose to fame after opening Alexander Wang's S/S 17 show at the age of 16.

Gerber has made editorials and has been on the cover of fashion magazines, including The Love Magazine, i-D, Teen Vogue and Pop Magazine, as well as different covers and international editions of Vogue, including Vogue Paris, Vogue Japan, Vogue Italia, Vogue British, Vogue India, Vogue China, Vogue Magazine, and "The Book edition" for Vogue Netherland with her mother in Winter 2016.

Gerber appeared in the Miu Miu eyewear campaign in 2016 and the Omega campaign in 2017 with her mother photographed by Peter Lindbergh. In Spring 2018, she appeared in campaigns for Versace, Calvin Klein, and Saint Laurent fall/winter. In 2018, she and Sofia Mechetner led the campaign for Marc Jacobs' fragrance Daisy. In the same year, she was the star of the Chanel spring handbags campaign photographed by Karl Lagerfeld, as well as Valentino. In 2018, Gerber collaborated with Karl Lagerfeld to create the KarlxKaia collection, her first collection. Also in 2018, Gerber won Model of the Year at the Fashion Awards.

=== 2019–present: Rise to prominence ===
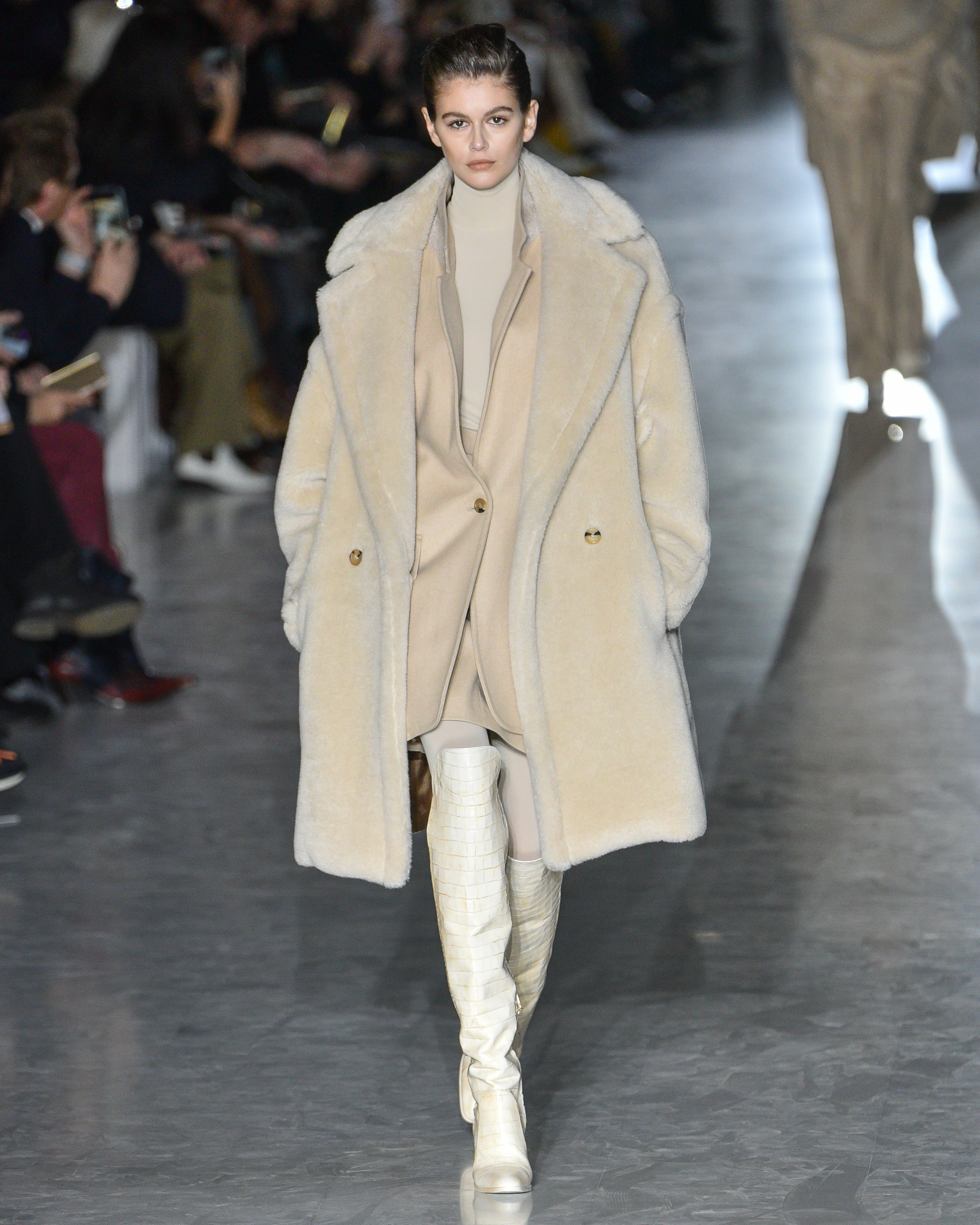
Gerber at the 2019 Max Mara Fashion Week in Milan

In 2019, Gerber starred in Jimmy Choo's spring/summer and fall/winter campaigns, the Stella McCartney spring campaign and the Fendi spring campaign. She also debuted as the new face of advertising campaigns and brand ambassador for YSL beauty. Gerber also appeared on the cover of the British Vogue for the October Issue. For the F/W 2019 season Gerber walked 26 fashion shows, opening 4 and closing 4.

In 2020, Gerber starred in the Louis Vuitton "Twist bag" spring summer advertising campaign photographed by Craig McDean. In 2020 Gerber appeared on her first American Vogue cover for the April issue along with supermodel Adut Akech and also appeared on the cover of Vogue Italia for the May and September Issue.

On August 14, 2020, Daily Front Row listed Gerber as one of a group of high-profile investors who purchased W magazine, a fashion magazine. Gerber appeared in the tenth season of the FX horror anthology American Horror Story, as well as its spinoff, American Horror Stories. In 2021, she appeared on the American Vogue cover, featuring on their June/July issue, and again on their September issue. She next appeared in Damien Chazelle's period drama Babylon, which was her feature film debut.

In 2023, Gerber covered the American and French editions of Elle and starred in an advertising campaign for Alaïa. She also appeared in the teen sex comedy film Bottoms alongside Rachel Sennott and Ayo Edebiri. It premiered at South by Southwest on March 11, 2023 to positive reviews. It was released in the United States on August 25, 2023. In 2024, Gerber appeared on the British Vogue for the March issue which featured 40 icons in the fashion industry.

On March 20, 2024, Palm Royale debuted on Apple TV+, with Gerber taking on the role of Mitzi, an aspiring model in 1969 Palm Beach. She appeared in both seasons of the show. On April 6, 2024, Gerber appeared in a cameo role in the Saturday Night Live sketch "Pilates". In December 2025, Gerber was named Global Brand Ambassador for NARS Cosmetics. She fronts the brand's Afterglow Lip Balm campaign, which was photographed by NARS founder and creative director François Nars.

== Personal life ==
Gerber resides in New York City and Malibu. She dated comedian Pete Davidson from late 2019 until February 2020. Gerber then dated Jacob Elordi from September 2020 to November 2021. In her longest relationship to date, Gerber dated actor Austin Butler from December 2021 to January 2025. As of January 2025, Gerber is in a relationship with Lewis Pullman.

== Awards and honors ==
Year	Award	Category	Result	Ref.
2015	The Daily's Annual Fashion Media Awards	Breakthrough Model Award	Won	
2018	The Fashion Awards	Model of the Year	Won	

== Filmography ==
=== Film ===
Year	Title	Role	Notes	Ref.
2022	Babylon	Starlet		
2022	Bottoms	Brittany		
2024	Saturday Night	Jacqueline Carlin		
2024	Shell	Chloe Benson		
2026	Outcome	Oksana		
2026	Mother Mary	Nikki		

=== Television ===
Year	Title	Role	Notes	Ref.
2016	Sister Cities	Young Carolina	Television film	
2017	Rich Kids of Instagram	Herself	Episode: "Pilot: RKOI"	
2021	American Horror Stories	Ruby McDaniel	3 episodes	
2021	American Horror Story: Double Feature	Kendall Carr	4 episodes	
2024	In the Know	Herself	Episode: "I'm No Hero"	
2024	RuPaul's Drag Race	Herself	Guest judge (season 16); episode: "See You Next Wednesday"	
2024–2026	Palm Royale	Mitzi	Recurring role	
2024	Saturday Night Live	Herself	Episode: "Kristen Wiig/Raye"; appeared in the pre-recorded sketch "Pilates"	
2025	Hacks	Herself	Episode: "D'Christening"	
2025	Overcompensating	Esther	3 episodes	
2026	The Shards	Susan Reynolds	Main role	

=== Music videos ===
Year	Title	Artist(s)	Notes
2019	"Burnout"	John Eatherly	
2020	"Imagine"	Gal Gadot & Friends	
2020	"Crying in the Mirror"	Rainsford	
