= Nate 'n Al of Beverly Hills =

Nate 'n Al's

Restaurant information
- Established: 1945
- Owner: Shelli and Irving Azoff
- Food type: Delicatessen
- Dress code: Casual
- Location: 414 North Beverly Drive, Beverly Hills, California, U.S.
- Website: www.natenals.com

Nate 'n Al's is a Jewish deli located in Beverly Hills, California. The restaurant opened in 1945, occasionally serving as an informal meeting place for show business personalities.

== History ==
Nate 'n Al's was started in 1945 by friends Al Mendelson and Nate Rimer. The two met in a Detroit deli twenty years before, and came up with the idea of opening their own deli. They moved to California and opened their deli calling it Nate ‘n Al in Beverly Hills. It had an initial capacity of thirty persons.

Catherine (Kaye) Coleman was the famous waitress-with-sass of the deli, credited for gathering a crowd of devoted regulars. She worked there for more than twenty years, up until her death in 2004. For over 40 years, Larry King had been a regular morning client of the deli.

After remaining a family restaurant for three generations, the restaurant was put up for sale in 2018 by the grand children of the original owners, then it was bought by Shelli and Irving Azoff the following year. In January 2019, it was announced that a group of investors including Rande Gerber and Cindy Crawford, Michael Meldman, Jeff Shell, and Jay Sures would purchase the deli and keep it open. In 2022, the Azoffs formed a partnership with H.Wood Group who will assume daily management of the restaurant while the Azoffs assumed advisory and financial role.

== Ratings ==
- 2011: #1 of LA Weekly's "Top 5 Matzo Ball Soups in Los Angeles".
- 2012: "Best Reubens in Los Angeles" according to CBS/Los Angeles.

== See also ==
- List of Ashkenazi Jewish restaurants
- List of delicatessens
