= Rande Gerber =

American businessman (born 1962)

- Born: April 27, 1962 (age 64); New York City, U.S.
- Occupation: Businessman
- Years active: 1986–present
- Spouse: Cindy Crawford (m. 1998)
- Children: Presley Gerber; Kaia Gerber
- Website: www.gerberbars.com

Rande Gerber (born April 27, 1962) is an American businessman. He founded Gerber Group and co-founded tequila brand Casamigos with George Clooney and Mike Meldman, as well as nightlife companies Midnight Oil and Caliche Rum. His portfolio has included restaurants, bars, and lounges worldwide. He is married to supermodel Cindy Crawford and is the father of models Kaia and Presley Gerber.

== Early life ==
Rande Gerber was born on April 27, 1962 in New York City, U.S., the son of Jordan Gerber and Ellen Peckman. His family is Jewish. He grew up in Hewlett, New York and graduated from Hewlett High School in 1980. He earned a bachelor's degree in marketing from the University of Arizona.

== Career ==
Gerber Group opened its first venue, The Whiskey, a bar at the Paramount Hotel in the New York City theater district, in 1991.

In 2013, he partnered with George Clooney and Michael Meldman to launch Casamigos Tequila. In June 2017, it was sold to Diageo for $700 million, with an additional $300 million possible depending on the company's performance over the next ten years.

In January 2019, it was announced that Gerber and his partners, Meldman, Jeff Shell, and Jay Sures would purchase Nate 'n Al of Beverly Hills and keep it open.

In April 2024, Gerber and his partners expanded the Casamigos portfolio with the launch of "Casamigas Jalapeño Tequila," a spicy line extension featuring his wife, Cindy Crawford, on the label.

In July 2025, Gerber announced a partnership with the luxury sun care brand Hampton Sun. He joined the company to advise on its 2025 rebranding and product rollout after encountering the brand while vacationing in Miami.

In October 2025, reports emerged that Gerber, Meldman, and Clooney were developing a non-alcoholic beer brand planned for release in 2026 called Crazy Mountain.

== Personal life ==
Gerber married model Cindy Crawford on May 29, 1998. They had two children, Presley (1999–2026) and Kaia (born 2001), both of whom became models.

In August 2021, the couple sold their home in Trousdale Estates, Beverly Hills, for a reported $13.5 million.
