= Casamigos =

American tequila company

- Type: Privately held company
- Founded: 2013, United States
- Founders: George Clooney, Rande Gerber, Mike Meldman
- Products: Tequila
- Revenue: ▲US$6 million
- Number of employees: 74
- Parent: Diageo
- Website: casamigostequila.com

Casamigos, often Casamigos Tequila, is an American tequila company founded by George Clooney, Rande Gerber and Mike Meldman. It has been owned by Diageo since 2017.

Casamigos was named "Supreme Brand Champion" of 2022 by The Spirits Business, as "the fastest-growing spirit brand" of the year. Friends Gerber and Clooney created the tequila in 2011 according to their personal tastes and for their personal use; in 2013 they started a company and began selling to the public. The name Casamigos is a portmanteau of the Spanish casa (house) and amigos (friends), thus "house of friends".

It was purchased in June 2017 by the multinational beverage company Diageo for $700 million plus up to a further $300 million based on the brand's performance. The purchase equated to Diageo paying almost $500 a bottle.

== See also ==
- List of tequilas
