= Timmy T. Davis =

American diplomat

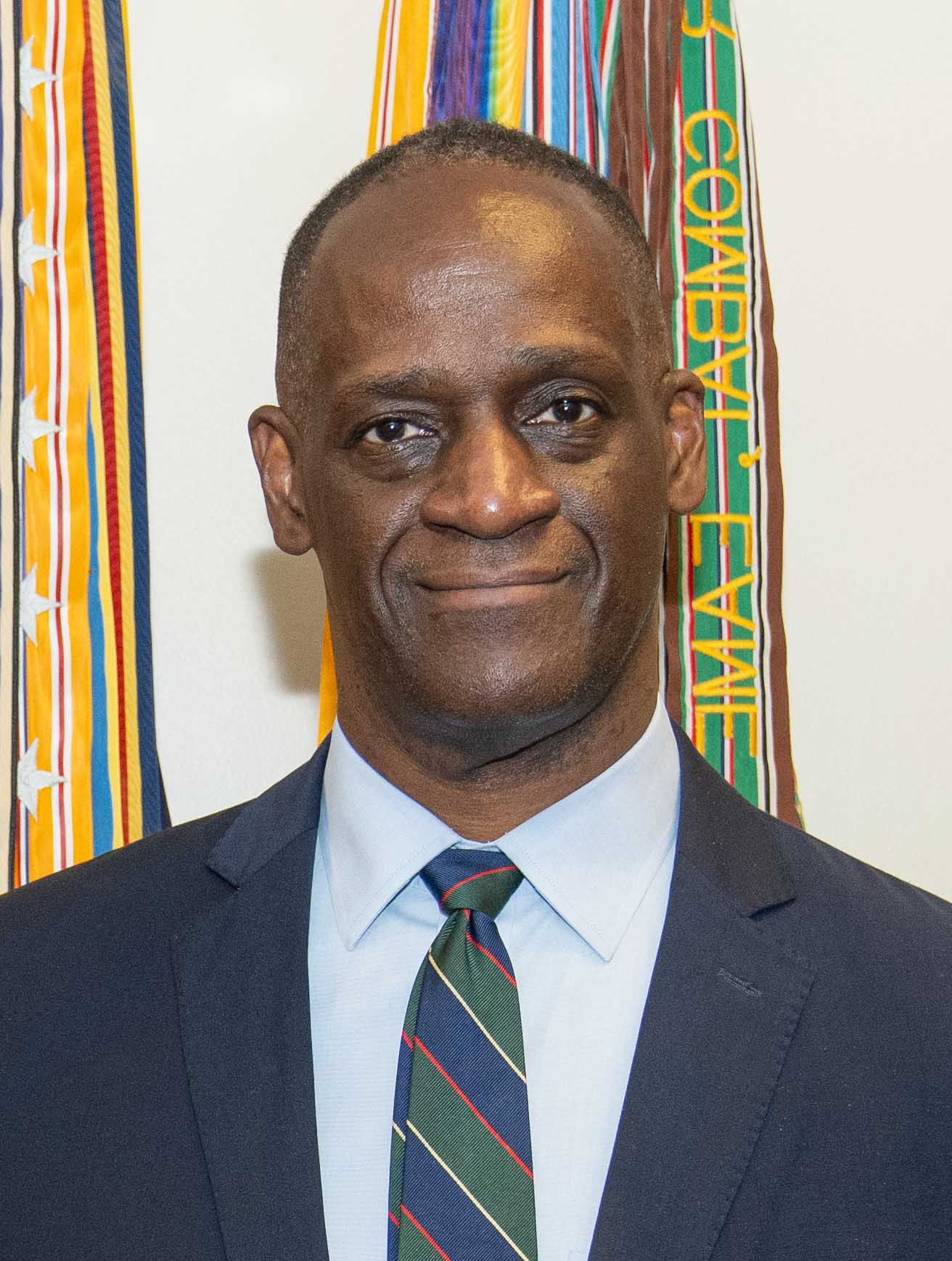

United States Ambassador to Qatar
- In office September 13, 2022 – June 15, 2025
- President: Joe Biden; Donald Trump
- Preceded by: Dana Shell Smith (2017)

Personal details
- Born: Quantico, Virginia, U.S.
- Timmy T. Davis's voice Davis's opening statement at his confirmation hearing before the Senate Foreign Relations Committee to be United States ambassador to Qatar; Recorded June 16, 2022

Timmy T. Davis is an American diplomat and retired Marine who served as the United States ambassador to Qatar From September 2022 to June 2025.

== Early life and education ==
A native of Virginia, Davis attended the University of Alabama and the University of Southern Mississippi. He considers New Orleans his hometown. He served in the United States Marine Corps for nearly a decade, including operations in the Horn of Africa and Iraq, before joining the Foreign Service. Davis speaks Spanish and Arabic.

Davis' father and mother are from Mississippi. His father is a retired U.S. Marine Master Gunnery Sergeant. Davis' younger sister, brother-in-law, and two of his uncles are all U.S. Marines. His older sister is a research nurse. He graduated from Lejeune High School at Camp Lejeune, N.C., though he grew up on a number of Marine Corps bases on the eastern seaboard.

== Career ==
Davis, a career member of the Senior Foreign Service with the rank of Counselor, has had an extensive career as a diplomat and official with the State Department. He most recently served as the Executive Assistant to the Secretary of State. Prior to that, Davis served as the U.S. Consul General for Basrah and Southern Iraq, where he led the eventual suspension of operations. His domestic assignments include senior watch officer in the State Department Operations Center, Special Assistant to the secretary of state, Director for Iraq at the National Security Council, Deputy Chief of Staff to the Special Presidential Envoy to the Global Coalition to Counter the Islamic State of Iraq and the Levant, Senior Advisor to the counselor of the United States Department of State, Chief of Staff to the undersecretary for political affairs, and acting Chief of Staff of the State Department. Davis is a Political Officer. His overseas tours include Guatemala City, Guatemala; Najaf, Iraq; Canberra, Australia; and Bogotá, Colombia. Davis was a party mentioned in the Hillary Clinton email controversy.

=== Ambassador to Qatar ===
On March 18, 2022, President Joe Biden announced his intent to nominate Davis to be the next United States Ambassador to Qatar. On March 30, 2022, his nomination was sent to the Senate. Hearings on his nomination were held before the Senate Foreign Relations Committee on June 16, 2022. The committee favorably reported his nomination to the Senate floor on June 23, 2022. His nomination was confirmed by the full Senate via voice vote on August 4, 2022. He presented his credentials to Amir Sheikh Tamim bin Hamad Al Thani on September 13, 2022.

A Department of State Office of the Inspector General report issued in May 2025 found a number of issues with Ambassador Davis’ leadership of the U.S. Embassy to Qatar. The report stated that a large portion of U.S. direct-hire staff told OIG they found the Ambassador inaccessible, unapproachable, and that his closed-door policy inhibited communication. Additionally, a small number of embassy U.S. direct-hire staff told OIG they witnessed the Ambassador openly express his displeasure with employees. The report stated that while the Ambassador told OIG he believed that embassy morale was high, OIG questionnaires found widespread dissatisfaction with his leadership.

== Awards and recognition ==
Davis has received a number of awards including the Distinguished Honor Award and multiple Superior and Meritorious Honor awards. He is also the recipient of the State Department's Ryan C. Crocker Award for Outstanding Leadership in Expeditionary Diplomacy, and the American Foreign Service Association's William R. Rivkin Award for Constructive Dissent.

== Personal life ==
Davis speaks Spanish and Arabic.

== See also ==
- Ambassadors of the United States

Diplomatic posts
Preceded by Greta C. Holtz; Chargé d'Affaires	United States Ambassador to Qatar; 2022–2025	Vacant
