= The Estancia Club =

Golf club in Scottsdale, Arizona

- Interactive map of The Estancia Club
- 33°44′17.81″N 111°51′55.79″W

Club information
- Location: Scottsdale, Arizona
- Established: 1995
- Website: http://www.estanciaclub.com/
- Designed by: Tom Fazio
- Par: 72
- Length: 7146 yards
- Course rating: 73.7
- Slope rating: 137

The Estancia Club is a private golf club located at the base of Pinnacle Peak Mountain in Scottsdale, Arizona, within the 600-acre (2.4 km^{2}) Estancia Club gated community. Designed by Tom Fazio, the course was built around the natural features of the land in order to take advantage of the desert and mountain scenery.

It was awarded Golf Digest’s award for the “Best New Private Course of 1996”, and, since then, the course has consistently been ranked among the best golf courses in America.

Estancia Club is a 7,146-yard (6,534 m) par 72 course, with a course rating of 73.7 and a slope rating of 137

The Estancia Club is member-owned and has 298 full golf members (maximum). Residents and non-residents may apply.
