= Dana Shell Smith =

American diplomat

Dana Smith
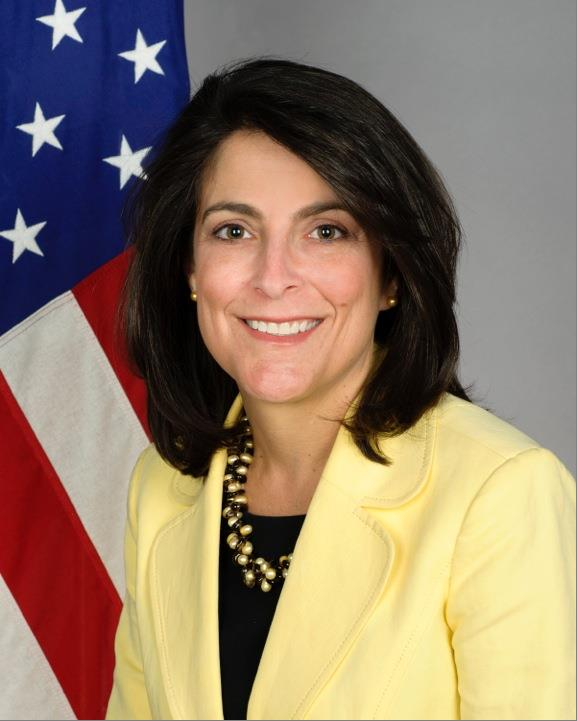

United States Ambassador to Qatar
- In office August 8, 2014 – June 20, 2017
- President: Barack Obama; Donald Trump
- Preceded by: Susan L. Ziadeh
- Succeeded by: Timmy T. Davis (2022)

Personal details
- Born: 1970 (age 55–56)
- Spouse: Ray Smith
- Relations: Jeff Shell (brother)
- Education: University of California, San Diego

Dana Shell Smith (born 1970) is a former American diplomat and career Foreign Service Officer who served as the United States Ambassador to Qatar from July 2014 to June 2017. She was confirmed by the Senate as the U.S. Ambassador to Qatar on July 10, 2014. Previously, she served as Principal Deputy Assistant Secretary of Public Affairs from 2011 to 2014 and as Deputy Assistant Secretary for International Media.

== Early life and education ==
In 1992, she graduated from the University of California at San Diego with a bachelor's degree in political science and Middle East studies.

== Career ==
On May 1, 2014, President Barack Obama nominated Smith to be the U.S. ambassador to Qatar. Smith was confirmed by the Senate as the U.S. ambassador to Qatar on July 10, 2014. She presented her credentials to Tamim bin Hamad Al Thani on September 8, 2014.

Previously, she served as principal deputy assistant secretary of public affairs from 2011 to 2014 and as deputy assistant secretary for international media.

On June 13, 2017, Smith announced that she would be resigning her post later that month. State Department records indicate June 20, 2017 as her official date of departure from service. Since leaving government service, she has been highly critical of the changes in the State Department under the Trump administration, describing the situation as a "disaster waiting to happen".

Prior to her assignments in the Bureau of Public Affairs, Smith was the State Department's Regional Arabic Language Spokesperson in Dubai. She served in a number of positions including as Senior Advisor to the Director General and overseas tours of duty in Taipei (as Chief of the Public Affairs Section and Spokesperson, American Institute in Taiwan), Amman, Tel Aviv/Gaza, and Cairo.

In November 2020, Smith was named a member of the Joe Biden presidential transition Agency Review Team to support transition efforts related to the U.S. Agency for Global Media.

Smith is a member of the Defense Policy Board Advisory Committee.

== Personal life ==
Smith speaks Arabic, Chinese, Spanish and Hebrew. She is married to Diplomatic Security Officer Ray Smith and they have two children. Her brother is Jeff Shell the former CEO of Comcast.

== Publications ==
- "How to Have an Insanely Demanding Job and 2 Happy Children". The Atlantic, June 27, 2012.
- "US-Qatar Relations: Realizing the Full Potential of a Growing Strategic Partnership". The Ambassadors Review, Spring 2015.

== See also ==
- List of ambassadors of the United States

Diplomatic posts
Preceded by Susan Ziadeh	United States Ambassador to Qatar; 2014–2017	Succeeded by Timmy T. Davis
