= Michael Meldman =

American businessman (born 1958)

Michael S. Meldman
- Meldman in 2021
- Born: December 30, 1958 (age 67); Milwaukee, Wisconsin, U.S.
- Occupation: Businessman
- Children: 3

Michael S. Meldman (born December 30, 1958) is an American businessman. He is the founder and chairman of Discovery Land Company. He is also a co-founder of Casamigos and, later, Crazy Mountain, as well as a minority owner of the Las Vegas Raiders.

== Early life ==
Meldman was born in Milwaukee, Wisconsin and grew up in Phoenix, Arizona. His father worked in insurance and his mother was a writer and book reviewer. He graduated from Stanford University in 1981, where he studied history. He was a member of Theta Delta Chi. He later worked as a blackjack dealer in Lake Tahoe.

== Career ==
After Meldman graduated in 1981, he began a career in real estate in the Bay Area of Northern California. His first position was as a commercial broker. Meldman financed his first property, a 300-acre lot in Portola Valley, California named Blue Oaks, through three friends in the 1980s.

In 1994, he launched Discovery Land Company. Two years later, he opened his first resort development, The Estancia Club, in Scottsdale. Meldman and Discovery Land Company operates over 35 high-end residential communities globally, as of 2024.

In 2007, Meldman launched the Discovery Land Company Foundation to support non-profit organizations that benefit children and families in the communities that surround the developments. He credits his sons as his influence for his properties, as the locations are catered toward families.

In 2012, Meldman partnered with Rande Gerber and George Clooney to create Casamigos tequila. In June 2017, it was sold to Diageo for $1 billion.

In 2019, he and Gerber were among the investor group that prevented the closure of Nate’n Al’s Jewish deli on Beverly Drive in Beverly Hills.

In 2022, he was noted by Forbes as having perfected the model of private, luxury golf community.

In December 2024, Meldman purchased a 7.5% stake in the Las Vegas Raiders. In May 2026, he increased his stake to 12.9% minority ownership of the team.

In March 2026, it was announced Meldman had again partnered with Gerber and Clooney to create a non alcoholic beer Crazy Mountain.

== Personal life ==
Meldman has three sons.
