= Charles Dunbar =

Charles Dunbar may refer to:

- Charles Dunbar (Royal Navy officer) (1849–1939), British admiral
- Charles Dunbar (British Army officer) (1919–1981), British general
- Charles Davidson Dunbar (1870–1939), pipe major
- Charles Franklin Dunbar (1830–1900), American economist
- Charles Franklin Dunbar (diplomat) (born 1937), American diplomat
- Charles O. Dunbar (1871–1939), American newspaper publisher and politician in California
