= Freedom of religion in Qatar =

In Qatar, the Constitution, as well as certain laws, officially provide for freedom of association, public assembly, and worship "in accordance with the requirements of public order and morality". Notwithstanding this, the law prohibits proselytizing by non-Muslims and places some restrictions on public worship. Islam is the state religion, and challenging this status is punishable by up to ten years in prison. Apostasy from Islam is punishable by the death penalty (although this has never been put into practice), and blasphemy is punishable by up to seven years in prison.

== Religious demography ==
In 2022, the population is estimated to be 2.5 million people. Citizens make up approximately 11% of the population, while noncitizens (mainly foreign workers) account for approximately 89%. Most citizens are Sunni Muslims.

The U.S. government estimates that as of 2020, Muslims make up 62.5% of the total population, Christians 13.7%, Hindus 15.9%, and Buddhists 3.8%. Boston University’s 2020 World Religions Database states Muslims are 78.5% of the population, Christians 13.1%, Hindus 3%, atheists and agnostics 2.2%, and Buddhists 1.8%. There is also a Baháʼí Faith community in Qatar.

While the Government does not release demographic figures regarding religious affiliation, some membership figures are available from Christian community groups. Accordingly, the Christian community includes Catholics (80,000), Eastern and Greek Orthodox, Anglicans (10,000), Copts (3,000), and other Protestants. The Hindu community is almost exclusively Indian, while Buddhists include South, Southeast, and East Asians. Most Baháʼís come from Iran.

No foreign missionary groups operate openly in the country.

== Status of religious freedom ==
=== Legal and policy framework ===
In 2007 it was noted that the Constitution, as well as certain laws, provide for freedom of association, public assembly, and worship in accordance with the requirements of public order and morality. However, the law prohibits proselytizing by non-Muslims and places some restrictions on public worship. The state religion is Islam. While most Qataris are Sunni, Shi'a Muslims freely practice their faith, the nationality law does not impose any restrictions on religious identity.

The Government and ruling family are linked inextricably to Islam. Non-Muslims, however, serve in government posts. The Ministry of Islamic Affairs controls the construction of mosques, clerical affairs, and Islamic education for adults and new converts. The emir participates in public prayers during both Eid holiday periods and personally finances the Hajj for citizens and noncitizens pilgrims who cannot afford to travel to Mecca.

Religious groups must register with the Government for legal recognition. The Government has granted legal status to Sunni and Shia Muslims, Roman Catholics, Anglicans, Greek Orthodox, Syrian Orthodox, Coptic Orthodox, Maronite, evangelical Protestants, and the Interdenominational Christian Churches.

The government maintains an official register of approved religious groups. To be recognized, each group must have at least 1,500 members in the country. While evangelical congregations are not legally recognized because they individually lack the required membership, they worship freely and are provided physical security for their celebrations by the Ministry of Interior when required.

Both Muslims and non-Muslims are tried under the unified court system, incorporating both secular law and Shari'a (Islamic law). Convicted Muslims may earn a sentence reduction of a few months by memorizing the Qur'an. Litigants in civil cases may request the Shari'a courts to assume jurisdiction. In 2005 a panel was established in the courts for the Shi'a. The panel decides cases regarding marriage, divorce, inheritance, and other domestic matters. In matters involving religious issues, the new Family Law applies, which is not restricted to one branch of Islam.

Islamic instruction is compulsory for Muslims in state-sponsored schools. While there were no restrictions on non-Muslims providing private religious instruction for children, most foreign children attended secular private schools. Muslim children were allowed to go to secular and coeducational private schools.

The Government regulates the publication, importation, and distribution of all religious books and materials. However, in practice, individuals and religious institutions were not prevented from importing holy books and other religious items for personal or congregational use.

The Islamic holy days of Eid al-Fitr and Eid al-Adha are national holidays.

Qatar does not require non-Muslims to fast during Ramadan, but all restaurants are closed during daylight hours and no-one can drink, smoke, or chew gum in public.

=== Restrictions on religious freedom ===
Government policy and practice contributed to the generally free practice of religion, although there were some restrictions.

Converting to another religion from Islam is considered apostasy and is technically a capital offense; however, since the country gained independence in 1971, there has been no recorded execution or other punishment for such an act. Qatar's blasphemy laws include imprisonment for seven years for an individual convicted of blasphemy, and an individual running an organisation that challenges the state religion of Islam can face up to ten years in prison.

The Government regulates the publication, importation, and distribution of non-Islamic religious literature. Individuals and religious institutions are allowed to import Bibles and other religious items for personal or congregational use. Christian religious literature, with the exception of Bibles, is readily available in English in local bookstores. In addition, religious materials for use at Christmas and Easter are readily available in local shops.

Religious services were held without prior authorization from the Government; however, congregations have been asked not to advertise them in advance or use visible religious symbols such as outdoor crosses. Christian services are regularly held and open to the public. Some services, particularly those on Easter and Christmas, drew more than 1,000 worshippers.

Christian clergy reported no problems wearing traditional religious clothing in public. While disclosure of religious affiliation is required when applying for a passport or other identity documents, affiliation is not reflected in the issued documents.

Hindus, Buddhists, Baháʼís and members of other religious groups do not operate as freely as Christian congregations.

According to the Criminal Code, individuals caught proselytizing on behalf of an organization, society, or foundation, for any religion other than Islam, may be sentenced to a prison term of up to 10 years. Proselytizing on behalf of an individual for any religion other than Islam can result in a sentence of up to 5 years. Individuals who possess written or recorded materials or items that support or promote missionary activity can be imprisoned for up to two years.

While discrimination against expatriates in the areas of employment, education, housing, and health services occurred, nationality was usually the determinant rather than religion.

There were no reports of religious prisoners or detainees in the country, although in 2021, a member of the Baháʼí Faith community was sentenced in absentia to one month in prison and a fine of 10,000 riyals (US$2,700) for collecting and wiring donations without authorization in violation of laws regulating charitable activities. Qatar has been accused of using the law for the 'ethnic cleansing' of Baháʼís.

==== Treatment of the Baháʼí community ====
The Baháʼí community of Qatar has existed since the 1940s and numbers between approximately 200 and 300 members of more than thirty nationalities, including Qatari citizens. Human Rights Watch has documented at least 14 deportations of Baháʼís between 2003 and 2025 that, according to the organisation, occurred for no apparent reason other than the deportees' religious identity, together with terminations of employment and refusals of the "certificate of good conduct" required for employment in Qatar. The Qatari government has not recognised the community or designated a governmental intermediary to liaise with it.

A Baháʼí cemetery has existed in Qatar since 1953; in 1974 the remains were relocated to the Thumama district of Doha to make way for a new road. In 2009, the Doha municipality bulldozed and dug up Baháʼí graves before the work was halted by order of the Emir; the identities of some disinterred remains were lost in the process. Alternative cemetery sites identified at al-Rayyan (2010) and Wadi Aba Salil in al-Wakra (2015) have not received construction permission. Baháʼí marriage and other personal-status documents issued by the National Spiritual Assembly of the Baháʼís in Qatar are generally not authenticated by the Ministry of Justice, forcing community members to travel abroad to attest such documents.

In April 2021, a Qatari court tried Remy Rowhani, chair of the National Spiritual Assembly of the Baháʼís of Qatar, in absentia and without notice on charges of violating Law No. 15 of 2014 (Regulating Charitable Activities) for collecting community donations in 2013 and 2014. He was sentenced to one month's imprisonment and a fine of 50,000 Qatari riyals (~$10,100 USD, equivalent to $13,700 in 2025); the Court of Cassation confirmed the sentence on 30 May 2022. On 23 December 2024, Rowhani was arrested at Hamad International Airport and served the one-month sentence, after which he was released in January 2025. He was re-arrested on 28 April 2025 under article 8 of the Cybercrime Prevention Law (No. 14 of 2014) (Note: Article 8 dictates a punishment of three-year imprisonment, plus a fine of 500,000 QAR (~$101,002 USD, equivalent to $137,400 in 2025), to be imposed on any person who "manages through an Information Network or any information technology technique to have an unlawful access to a website or an information system belonging to a state authority, body or entity or any affiliated corporation."), article 259 of the Penal Code (Note: "Whoever opposes or doubts any of the basics or tenets of Islam, or calls upon, or favors or promotes another religion, cult or concept shall be punished with imprisonment for a term not exceeding five years."), and article 47(b) of the 1979 Law on Publications and Publishing (Note: "[The following shall not be published] (b) Any material that could endanger the internal and external security of the State, including any propaganda to adopt any destructive principles.") — charges relating to a Baháʼí community account on X — and sentenced on 13 August 2025 to five years' imprisonment. On 30 September 2025, the Qatari court of appeal reversed the conviction, and Rowhani was released on 4 October 2025.

In April 2022, the International Religious Freedom or Belief Alliance issued a joint statement, carried by the U.S. Embassy in Doha, noting an "increased pattern of repression and discrimination against members of the Baháʼí community". In June 2022, the U.S. Commission on International Religious Freedom published a factsheet describing "increasing religious freedom restrictions on Baha'is in Qatar" and stated that the community was, in its assessment, "at risk of being eradicated from the country." The UK Foreign, Commonwealth and Development Office stated that month that British officials in Doha had raised Baháʼí concerns with the Qatari Ministry of Interior and Ministry of Foreign Affairs. On 31 July 2025, seven UN Special Procedures mandate-holders — including the Special Rapporteur on freedom of religion or belief Nazila Ghanea, the Working Group on Arbitrary Detention, and the Special Rapporteur in the field of cultural rights — issued a joint statement of "grave concern" about what they described as a "broader and disturbing pattern of disparate treatment of the Baháʼí minority in Qatar." In September 2025, the International Bar Association's Human Rights Institute, in a joint letter signed by Baroness Helena Kennedy, called for Rowhani's conviction to be quashed, citing alleged violations of ICCPR multiple legal articles and detailing breaches of due process.

On 30 April 2026, the Baháʼí International Community stated that "over 40 percent of Qatar's Baháʼí population faces imminent expulsion" and characterised the recent wave of measures as, in its words, a "deliberate campaign of religious erasure." In June 2026, Human Rights Watch reported that since March 2026 the authorities had ordered at least four people holding roles in the community's institutions to leave the country without due process or any avenue of appeal, one of them detained for a week while awaiting deportation.

=== Changes and developments in religious freedom ===
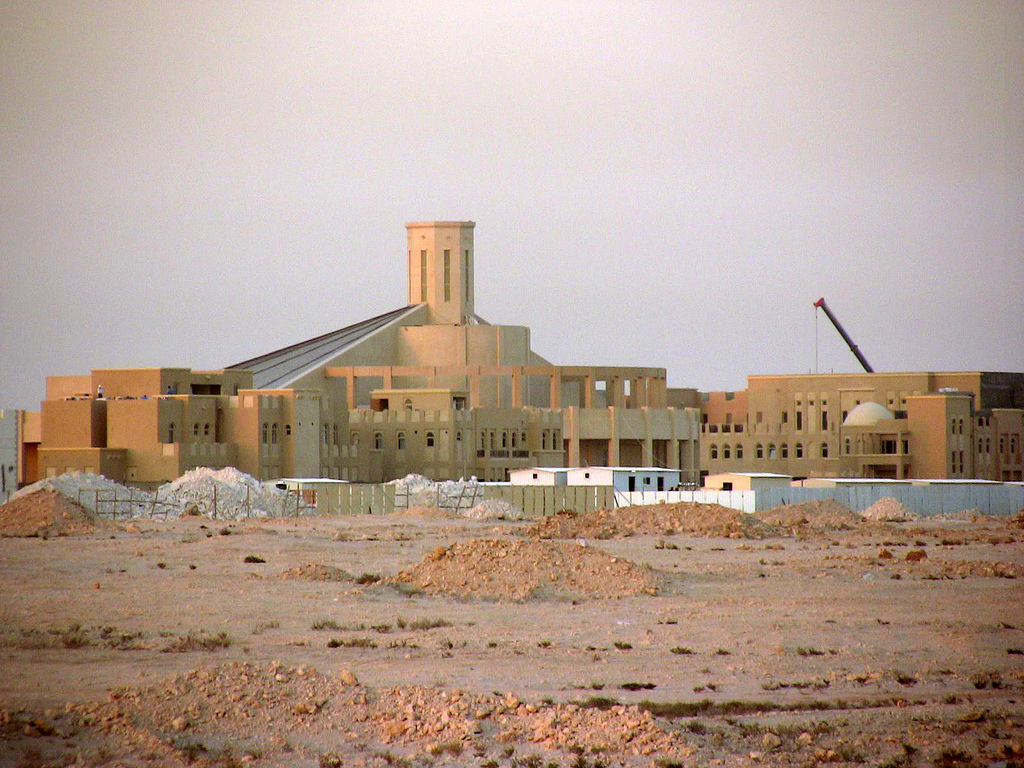
Catholic Church of Our Lady of the Rosary in Mesaimeer

In September 1988, the Qatari government lifted its prohibition against public worship by Christians and other non-Islamic groups, following negotiations between US Ambassador Joseph Ghougassian and Emir Khalifa bin Hamad Al Thani.

The Amir and other top government officials allowed the construction and establishment of churches. The Government assigned a coordinator in the Ministry of Foreign Affairs to speed up and facilitate the process, although some restrictions have been imposed on the use of certain religious symbols on buildings.

In May 2005, representatives of Christian churches in the country signed an agreement with the Government for a 50-year lease on land near Doha, where they intend to erect 6 churches. The leases will be nominal. Our Lady of the Rosary, the first Catholic church in Qatar and the first in an Arab Muslim emirate, was dedicated on March 14, 2008.

The Government granted each church permission to apply for visas for visiting clerics to preside over, and assist in, church services. There were no restrictions on religious ceremonies. Plans for large events were reported to the Ministry of Foreign Affairs, which in turn requested the Ministry of Interior to provide appropriate physical security measures.

== Inter-faith dialogue ==
The Fifth Conference of Inter-Faith Dialogue took place in Doha on May 7–9, 2007. Christian, Muslim and Jewish representatives were invited. Invitations were extended to the Catholic, Anglican, Coptic and other Orthodox denominations, as well as the Middle East Churches Council and Jewish rabbis, among others. Rabbis from the United States and other countries participated. During the conference, the Government announced the establishment of the "Doha International Center for Inter-Faith Dialogue". The center will be financed by the Government but will function as an independent entity. Its purpose will be to follow up on conference resolutions, papers, and studies, and engage local and international research centers and universities. The Center was established in 2010.

== World rankings ==
In 2023, Qatar was ranked as the 34th most dangerous country to be a Christian.

Qatar was also given a score of 2 out of 4 in the area of freedom of religious worship.

== See also ==
- Human rights in Qatar
- Religion in Qatar
- Islam in Qatar
- Christianity in Qatar
- Catholic Church in Qatar
- Protestantism in Qatar
- History of the Jews in Qatar

== Source ==
- United States Bureau of Democracy, Human Rights and Labor. Qatar: International Religious Freedom Report 2007. This article incorporates text from this source, which is in the public domain.
