= Joseph LeBaron =

American diplomat

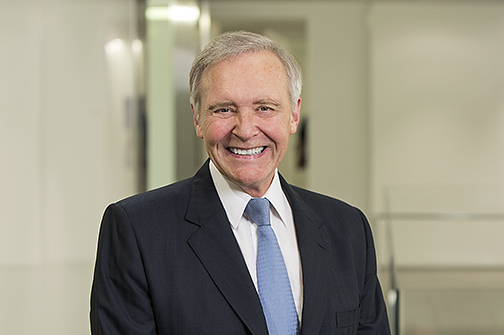

United States Ambassador to Qatar
- In office July 18, 2008 – July 29, 2011
- President: George W. Bush; Barack Obama
- Preceded by: Chase Untermeyer
- Succeeded by: Susan L. Ziadeh

United States Ambassador to Mauritania
- In office September 1, 2003 – November 22, 2007
- President: George W. Bush
- Preceded by: John W. Limbert
- Succeeded by: Mark Boulware

Personal details
- Born: September 3, 1947 (age 79)
- Spouse: Elinor R. Drake LeBaron
- Children: Petra Drake LeBaron
- Education: Portland State University; Princeton University
- Profession: Diplomat

Joseph Evan LeBaron (born September 3, 1947) is the former United States ambassador to the State of Qatar (July 18, 2008 – July 29, 2011) and to the Islamic Republic of Mauritania (September 1, 2003 – November 22, 2007).

In September 2011, LeBaron joined the law firm of Squire Patton Boggs as senior advisor. He is active in the practice areas of public policy and international business, with an emphasis on the Middle East, especially the Persian Gulf. LeBaron is the founder and CEO of GulfScape Arabia, LLC, a private consulting firm based in Washington, D.C. He is also the vice chairman of Daruna for Real Estate Brokerage & Development, a Qatar-based company focused on building migrant worker housing that meets all international standards. In October 2015, Daruna signed a $219.4 million deal to build a residential complex for 12,000 workers housed on a 150,000 square meter plot. LeBaron is also an adviser for Omnipoynt LLC, a private consulting firm with a focus on 4IR technology.

== Diplomatic biography ==
LeBaron was sworn in as United States ambassador to Qatar by Chief Justice Paul J. De Muniz of the Oregon Supreme Court on July 18, 2008, in a ceremony at the Simon Benson House of Portland State University in Portland, Oregon. PSU interim president Michael J. Reardon presided over the ceremony. The event is believed to be the first time a career U.S. diplomat has been sworn in as ambassador in a public ceremony that was held in the United States outside Washington, D.C.

== The State of Qatar ==
While in Qatar as ambassador, LeBaron introduced the doctrine and practice of "interagency synchronization in the field," a strategic framework for embassy operations. In a report released by the Department of State's Office of the Inspector General after its routine inspection of the embassy in April 2010, the OIG called it "an idea worth considering by other chiefs of mission."

The report described the approach in detail: "The Ambassador and DCM place a high priority on teamwork among the agencies and sections of the mission. Their emphasis is not just on coordination, but on working together to achieve clearly laid out goals. The primary vehicle for this priority is the Ambassador's synchronization process, which is an innovative approach to strategic planning and execution that draws on his recent experience working with the U.S. military." The report went on to say that "the Ambassador's experience, both in the region and as a political advisor to U.S. Special Operations Command, contributes to the embassy's close and productive coordination with the military."

"The process begins with an examination of agency-specific strategic planning documents relevant to Qatar," the report continued. "Additional guidance is obtained from Presidential policy statements, such as the June 2009 Cairo speech and the U.S. National Security Strategy."

"The Ambassador holds a semiannual interagency offsite meeting to analyze trends in Qatar and their implications for U.S. policy objectives. This meeting provides the basis for the creation of interagency synchronization groups with clearly defined goals and timelines for achieving them. The groups cover issues such as security and counterterrorism, the National Export Initiative, critical infrastructure protection, and Muslim community outreach. The groups adjust their objectives or conclude operations when their goals are achieved. All groups are chaired by the DCM and meet every two weeks or, in some cases, less frequently," the report said.

The report did acknowledge that some organizations within the embassy team felt the frequency of meetings distracted them from operational coordination (the report cited the frequency of meetings: "The Ambassador chairs a weekly country team meeting [and] he meets bi-weekly with agency heads and section chiefs."), "but given the Ambassador's strong commitment, [the agencies and section chiefs] want to do all they can to support the process."

"This process sounds complicated at first, but it provides clarity and focus to interagency goals and is heavily results-oriented. It promotes teamwork and helps agencies and sections see how their own agendas can be reinforced through cooperation with their counterparts in the embassy. It also helps the embassy enlist the growing number of high-level visitors to advance the embassy's objectives in meetings with Qatari officials," the report noted.

The report concluded: "The process is compatible with the Mission Strategic and Resource Plan process and is an idea worth considering by other chiefs of mission for possible adaptation to their own circumstances."

Although the OIG report characterized LeBaron as "a distant figure to some of the staff," it praised the efforts of his team. For example, it said "[the Ambassador] presides over embassy-wide gatherings, such as hail and farewell ceremonies," but it recommended "[his] briefing sessions could be used as more formal means to solicit LE (Locally Employed) ideas. The front office and political/economic officers could also hold an off-site discussion with LE staff... [and] in addition to information sharing, an off-site would enhance report and cooperation... The OIG team made an informal recommendation to address this issue."

In a July 2011 interview with the Wharton School of the University of Pennsylvania, LeBaron said, "for the three years that I've been Ambassador in Qatar, therefore, I have focused on establishing Embassy synchronization groups to achieve the strategic goals and objectives of the U.S. government at the planning and programmatic levels." He continued, commenting on his leadership approach: "Ambassadors are responsible for managing and, where appropriate, deepening the relationship between two states — across the entire range of issues, whether those issues are commercial, military, educational, political, or cultural."

"One of the biggest challenges I have faced as an Ambassador is synchronizing in the host country the programs and activities of the Executive Branch of the United States. What I've seen over the years as a professional diplomat is a tendency towards uncoordinated planning and programmatic action in the Executive Branch. That lack of synchronized planning and operations at the tactical level can confuse and mislead host countries about the nature and intent of U.S. policies in the region."

He said, referring to doing business in the Gulf, "Frequent, clear communication about your goals and your intent is key; a concise message often repeated in a variety of ways and venues. Carefully chosen themes and points, repeated so that people eventually internalize what you say. You need to have a clear sense of where you want to go and you need to communicate that direction clearly to others, identifying the shared interests that exist as you do."

As LeBaron was preparing to leave Qatar in July, 2011, and join the private sector, he was also asked during his Wharton interview for his recommendations to the business sector. LeBaron noted that there is a high barrier to entry to Gulf markets, particularly for small and medium-sized companies, in quite a few countries in the region. "Knowing the business conditions; understanding how business is done; identifying a local partner; determining how to structure one's presence in the country — all are important and often difficult commercial steps. They are not simple and straightforward. The region can be a difficult, complex commercial operating environment, particularly for small and medium size enterprises (SME's)."

"I certainly know our Commercial Office at the U.S. Embassy in Qatar does not advise small companies to begin their overseas activities with the Middle East region. There are communication problems as well," he continued. "Once you make that decision on presence, a whole host of decisions necessarily follows: how is your business presence to be structured, for example. Will it be a branch office or a representative office? With whom, if anyone, will you partner? Does it make sense to be in a duty free zone? There are several issues that must be addressed, and these often vary by country. The one approach I would strongly advise against is coming in angling for a quick sale and moving on. That is usually the wrong way to approach the Gulf. Establishing relationships, making a commitment to doing business in the country, and staying involved in the region are extremely important. The companies that I see coming to the region usually understand this; they have a quite realistic and knowledgeable approach to the region. I find U.S. business representatives to be an impressive group.

== Controversies ==
During his time as ambassador in Qatar, LeBaron was involved in a diplomatic incident with Turkish Ambassador Fuat Tanlay that occurred on the outskirts of a meeting between Secretary of State Hillary Clinton and Turkish Prime Minister Tayyip Erdogan (an "altercation" described as a "yelling match" and a "violent fight").

In July 2015, Doha News reported that Daruna for Real Estate Brokerage and Development, where Lebaron holds a vice chairmanship, was under fire for purchasing technology to track workers. A Human Rights Watch representative criticized the purchase, saying "Passport confiscation, recruitment fees, sponsorship-based employment, the prohibition of trade unions, and absence of grievance mechanisms combine to a toxic effect in Qatar. The last thing we need is yet another control mechanism." An Amnesty International representative said, while "the new technology may have some positive uses... the Qatari authorities, Daruna and the developers must ensure its application respects the rights of migrant workers, particularly the rights to privacy and freedom of movement, and does not enable businesses to tighten existing conditions of forced labor."

== The Islamic Republic of Mauritania ==
While Ambassador to Mauritania, LeBaron organized the first bilateral consultations in the then 45-year history of US-Mauritanian diplomatic relations. He also mounted extensive disaster relief for a locust invasion and helped start a long-delayed political dialogue between the Mauritanian government and opposition parties, journalists, and human rights groups. He also launched the first US-Mauritanian Business Council and helped secure the largest US aircraft sale to Mauritania ever.

When a huge locust invasion struck the Trans-Sahara region in 2004, LeBaron campaigned early on for a prompt international response to meet the consequent food crisis. The U.S. Agriculture Department subsequently agreed to supply 17,000 metric tons of wheat and rice, the first Title I commodities to Mauritania in over 17 years, as well as $10 million more in Title II relief. That more than tripled the U.S. government's food aid to Mauritania.

== Personal ==
LeBaron received a BS in sociology from Portland State University and an MA and PhD in Near Eastern Studies from Princeton University. LeBaron served in the United States Air Force during the Vietnam War. From 2006-2008, he served as the Political Advisor to the Commander, U.S. Special Operations Command, MacDill AFB, Tampa, Florida. From 2001-2003, he served as a faculty member at The George Washington University's Elliott School of International Affairs.

He is married to Elinor R. Drake LeBaron and has one daughter, Petra Drake LeBaron.

Diplomatic posts
Preceded by Chase Untermeyer	United States ambassador to Qatar; 2008–2011	Succeeded by Susan L. Ziadeh
