= Christianity in Qatar =

The Christian community in Qatar is a diverse mix of European, North and South American, Asian, Middle Eastern and African expatriates. In 2023, they form around 15.4% of the total population. Many of them are from the Philippines, Europe, and India. Most Christians in Qatar are not Arab Christians.

Qatar's Christian community originated in pre-Islamic times, and the modern-day region of Qatar was once part of a historical Christian region in eastern Arabia known as Beth Qatraye.

The constitution provides for religious liberty. Proselytizing by non-Muslims is prohibited by law. No foreign missionary groups openly operate in the country. Religious groups must register with the government for legal recognition.

== History ==
Many of the inhabitants of Qatar were introduced to Christianity after the religion was dispersed eastward by Mesopotamian Christians from 224 AD onwards. Monasteries were constructed in Qatar during this era. During the latter part of the Christian era, Qatar was known by the Syriac name 'Beth Qatraye'. A variant of this was 'Beth Catara'. The name translates to 'region of the Qataris'. The region also included Bahrain, Tarout Island, Al-Khatt, and Al-Hasa. In the fifth century AD, Beth Qatraye was the main centre of the Nestorian Christian Church of the East, which ruled the southern shores of the Persian Gulf. The Nestorians were often persecuted for being viewed as heretics by the Byzantine Empire, but Eastern Arabia was outside the control of the Byzantine Empire and the region provided some security. In 628, most of the Arab tribes converted to Islam.

It is likely that some settled populations in Qatar did not immediately convert to Islam. Isaac of Nineveh, a 7th-century Syriac Christian bishop regarded as a saint in some churches, was born in Qatar. Other notable Christian scholars dating to this period who hailed from the Qatari Peninsula include Dadisho Qatraya, Gabriel of Qatar, Gabriel Arya and Ahob of Qatar. In 674, the bishops of Beth Qatraye stopped attending synods; although the practice of Christianity persisted in the region until the late 9th century.

In September 1988, the Qatari government lifted its prohibition against public worship by Christians and other non-Islamic faiths, following negotiations between US Ambassador Joseph Ghougassian and Emir Khalifa bin Hamad Al Thani.

== Denominations ==
Among the denominations mentioned in the World Christian Encyclopedia, second edition, Volume 1, p. 617–618 are the Roman Catholic Church, Coptic Orthodox Church, Greek Orthodox Church, Syriac Orthodox Church, Ethiopian Orthodox Tewahedo Church, Anglican Churches, Malankara Orthodox Syrian Church, Malankara Catholic Church, Syro-Malabar Church, Assemblies of God in India, India Pentecostal Church of God and Jacobite Syrian Christian Church.

The Coptic minority in Qatar is substantial; they have a renovated church, St. Paul & St. Peter Coptic Orthodox Church at the Religious Complex in Qatar. Qatar's Anglican population is estimated at 7,000 to 10,000.

In 2023, there were about 350,000 Catholics in Qatar (including nine priests), under the jurisdiction of the Apostolic Vicariate of Northern Arabia.

== Religious Complex, Doha ==
In May 2005, representatives of Christian churches in Qatar signed an agreement with the Qatari Government for a fifty-year lease on a large piece of property in Mesaimeer, on the outskirts of Doha, on which they intended to erect six churches at their own expense. The churches were expected to pay nominal lease fees of a few hundred dollars a year, renewable after ten years. The property was expected to include an Anglican church that may also be used by other Protestant denominations, a church to serve thirty-four Indian-Christian congregations, a church for the country's small but influential Coptic community, and a site for two Orthodox churches, one Greek and one Eastern Rite.

In December 2005, the foundation stone for the Catholic Church was laid and the ground-breaking took place at the end of April 2006. A board composed of members of all the Christian churches liaises directly with the Ministry of Foreign Affairs regarding church matters. Each church has been granted permission to apply for visas for visiting clerics to preside over and assist in church services. Previously, Catholics and other Christians were limited to informal group meetings in homes.

The Anglican Church of the Epiphany was officially opened on 21 September 2013 and consecrated on 28 September 2013. The church sanctuary can accommodate up to 650 worshipers. The Anglican Centre, managed by the Anglican Church in Qatar, accommodates 59 additional Evangelical, Pentecostal and Protestant congregations.

The St. Isaac and St. George Greek Orthodox Church serves the Orthodox communities, numbering about 10,000 people from Africa, Asia, and throughout the Middle East including Syria.

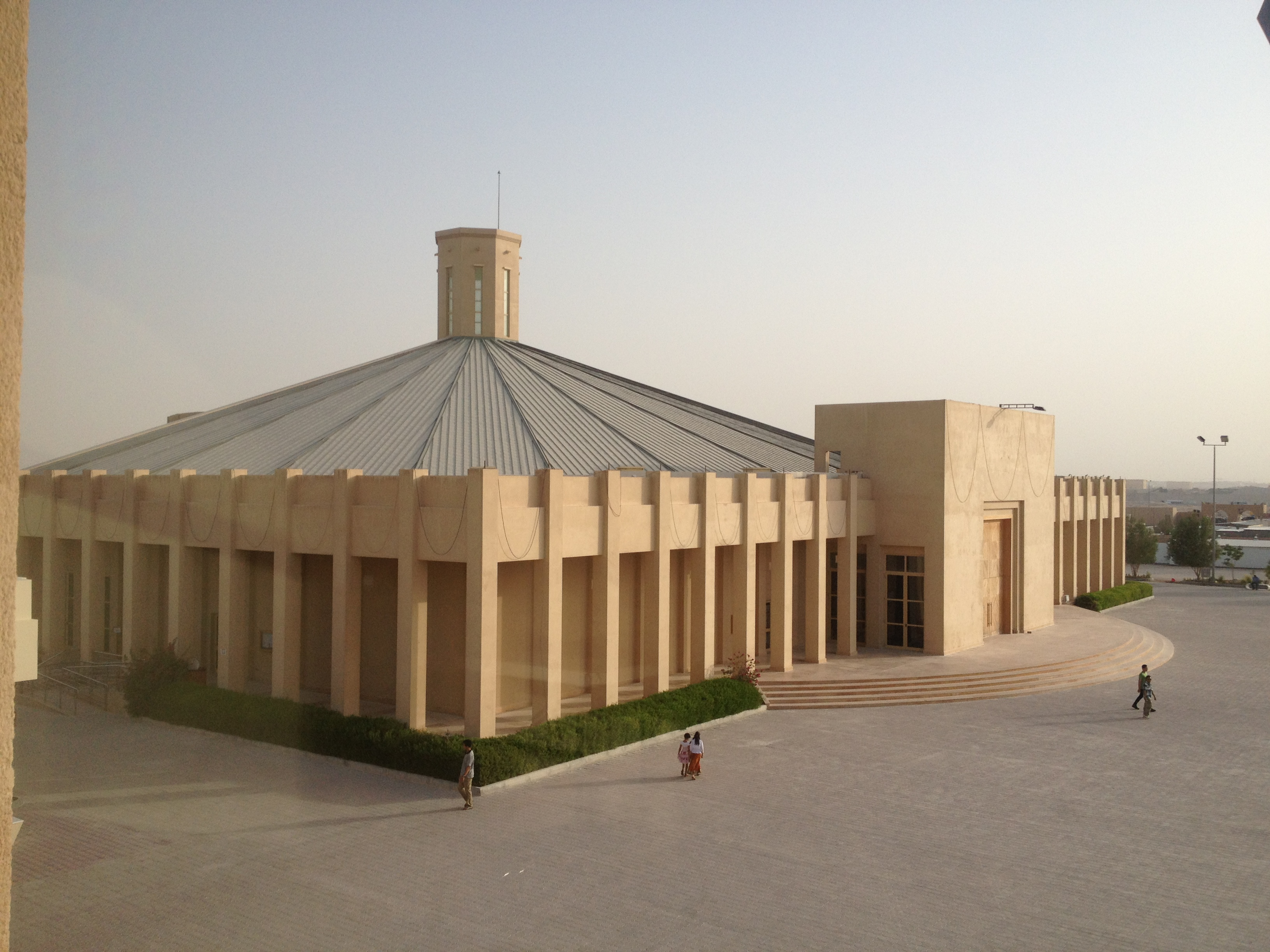
Church of Our Lady and Rosary

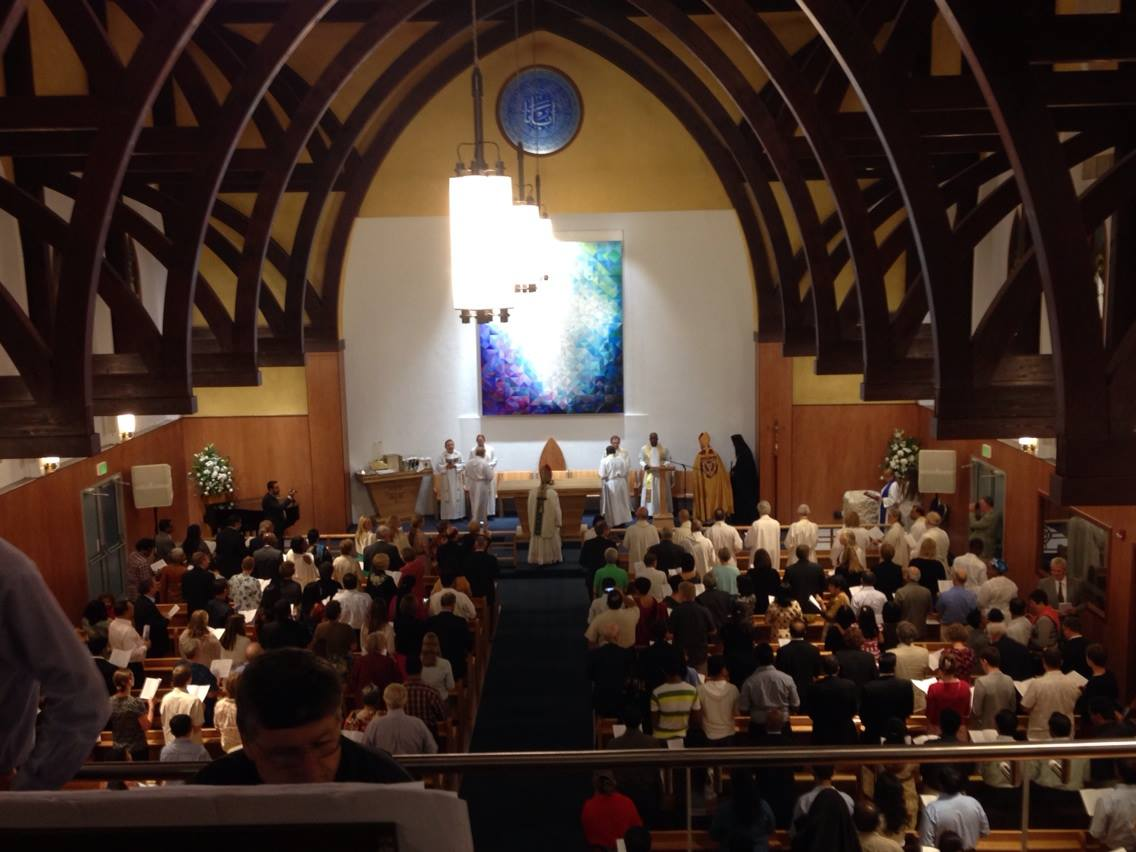
Anglican Church of the Epiphany

== See also ==
- Catholic Church in Qatar
- Christianity in Eastern Arabia
- Christianity in the Middle East
- Freedom of religion in Qatar
- Protestantism in Qatar
- Religion in Qatar
