= List of ambassadors of the United States to Qatar =

Ambassador of the United States to Qatar
- سفارة الولايات المتحدة الأميركية في دولة قطر
- Seal of the United States Department of State

- Flag of a United States ambassador

- Incumbent; Chris Hodges; Chargé d'affaires since August 6, 2026
- Nominator: The president of the United States
- Appointer: The president; with Senate advice and consent
- Inaugural holder: William Stoltzfus as Ambassador Extraordinary and Plenipotentiary
- Formation: December 9, 1971
- Website: U.S. Embassy - Doha

The United States ambassador to Qatar is the official representative of the government of the United States to the government of Qatar.

== Ambassadors ==
Name	Title	Appointed	Presented credentials	Terminated mission	Notes
William Stoltzfus – Career FSO	Ambassador Extraordinary & Plenipotentiary	December 9, 1971	March 19, 1972	August 21, 1974	
Robert Peter Paganelli – Career FSO	Ambassador Extraordinary & Plenipotentiary	June 20, 1974	August 22, 1974	July 13, 1977	
Andrew Ivy Killgore – Career FSO	Ambassador Extraordinary & Plenipotentiary	August 3, 1977	September 29, 1977	June 29, 1980	
Charles E. Marthinsen – Career FSO	Ambassador Extraordinary & Plenipotentiary	May 23, 1980	July 30, 1980	August 1, 1983	
Charles Franklin Dunbar – Career FSO	Ambassador Extraordinary & Plenipotentiary	October 7, 1983	October 30, 1983	March 23, 1985	
Joseph Ghougassian – Political appointee	Ambassador Extraordinary & Plenipotentiary	December 6, 1985	December 29, 1985	June 30, 1989	
Mark Gregory Hambley – Career FSO	Ambassador Extraordinary & Plenipotentiary	October 10, 1989	October 30, 1989	August 15, 1992	
Kenton Keith – Career FSO	Ambassador Extraordinary & Plenipotentiary	May 26, 1992	September 2, 1992	July 17, 1995	
Patrick N. Theros – Career FSO	Ambassador Extraordinary & Plenipotentiary	October 3, 1995	November 12, 1995	November 23, 1998	
Elizabeth Davenport McKune – Career FSO	Ambassador Extraordinary & Plenipotentiary	October 1, 1998	December 6, 1998	June 20, 2001	
Maureen E. Quinn – Career FSO	Ambassador Extraordinary & Plenipotentiary	August 7, 2001	September 24, 2001	July 12, 2004	
Chase Untermeyer – Political appointee	Ambassador Extraordinary & Plenipotentiary	August 2, 2004	December 7, 2004	August 19, 2007	
Joseph LeBaron – Career FSO	Ambassador Extraordinary & Plenipotentiary	June 6, 2008	November 3, 2008	July 29, 2011	
Susan L. Ziadeh - Career FSO	Ambassador Extraordinary & Plenipotentiary	July 5, 2011	October 9, 2011	August 11, 2014	
Dana Shell Smith - Career FSO	Ambassador Extraordinary & Plenipotentiary	July 10, 2014	September 8, 2014	June 20, 2017	
Greta C. Holtz - Career FSO	Chargé d'Affaires	June 14, 2020		June 16, 2022	
Timmy T. Davis - Career FSO	Ambassador Extraordinary & Plenipotentiary	August 4, 2022	September 13, 2022	June 15, 2025	
Stefanie Altman-Winans - Career FSO	Chargé d'Affaires	June 16, 2025		January 16, 2026	
Mo Barghouty - Career FSO	Chargé d'Affaires	January 17, 2026		August 5, 2026	
Chris Hodges - Career FSO	Chargé d'Affaires	August 6, 2026		Present	

== See also ==
- Qatar – United States relations
- Foreign relations of Qatar
- Ambassadors of the United States
