= EarthSpark =

EarthSpark may refer to:

- Transformers: EarthSpark, TV series
- EarthSpark International, nonprofit organization
