= Holmes Tuttle =

Holmes P. Tuttle (June 17, 1905 – June 16, 1989) was a successful California businessman and autodealer, and headed President Ronald Reagan's unofficial "Kitchen Cabinet".

== Early life and career ==
Tuttle was born in Tuttle, Oklahoma. The city is named for Tuttle's father. In 1923, at the age of seventeen, Tuttle began his automotive career by going to work at the Ford Parts facility in Oklahoma City. Although Ford had a policy of not hiring anyone under the age of twenty-one, Tuttle, who stood well over 6 feet, was referred by a banker who knew Tuttles' father. He traveled west in 1926, to Los Angeles, aboard a freight train, until he and his friend, who had talked him into moving to California, were caught by a train agent and thrown off. They convinced a well-to-do lady, whose driver had broken his leg, to let them drive her to California. He was employed as a parts manager at a Ford dealership. He opened his own dealership in 1945, which became known as Holmes Tuttle, Inc. The business was a resounding success and evolved into fourteen dealerships in California and Arizona. One of his first dealerships was located in Los Angeles. In the late 1940s Holmes was offered the national distributorship for a European manufacturer. Tuttle turned it down. He had just lost nearly a million dollars as the distributor of the English Ford and stated that "... if our returning GIs wouldn't buy a car built by our English allies, then they certainly won't buy a car built in Germany called a Volkswagen." In the mid-1950s Ford Motor Co., asked Mr. Tuttle to talk to a dealer in Tucson, Arizona, who was ill and needed to sell his Ford store. After meeting for about 15 minutes, Holmes Tuttle agreed to buy Monte Mansfield Ford. Today, more than a half century later, this dealership is still Holmes Tuttle Ford.

== Political involvement ==
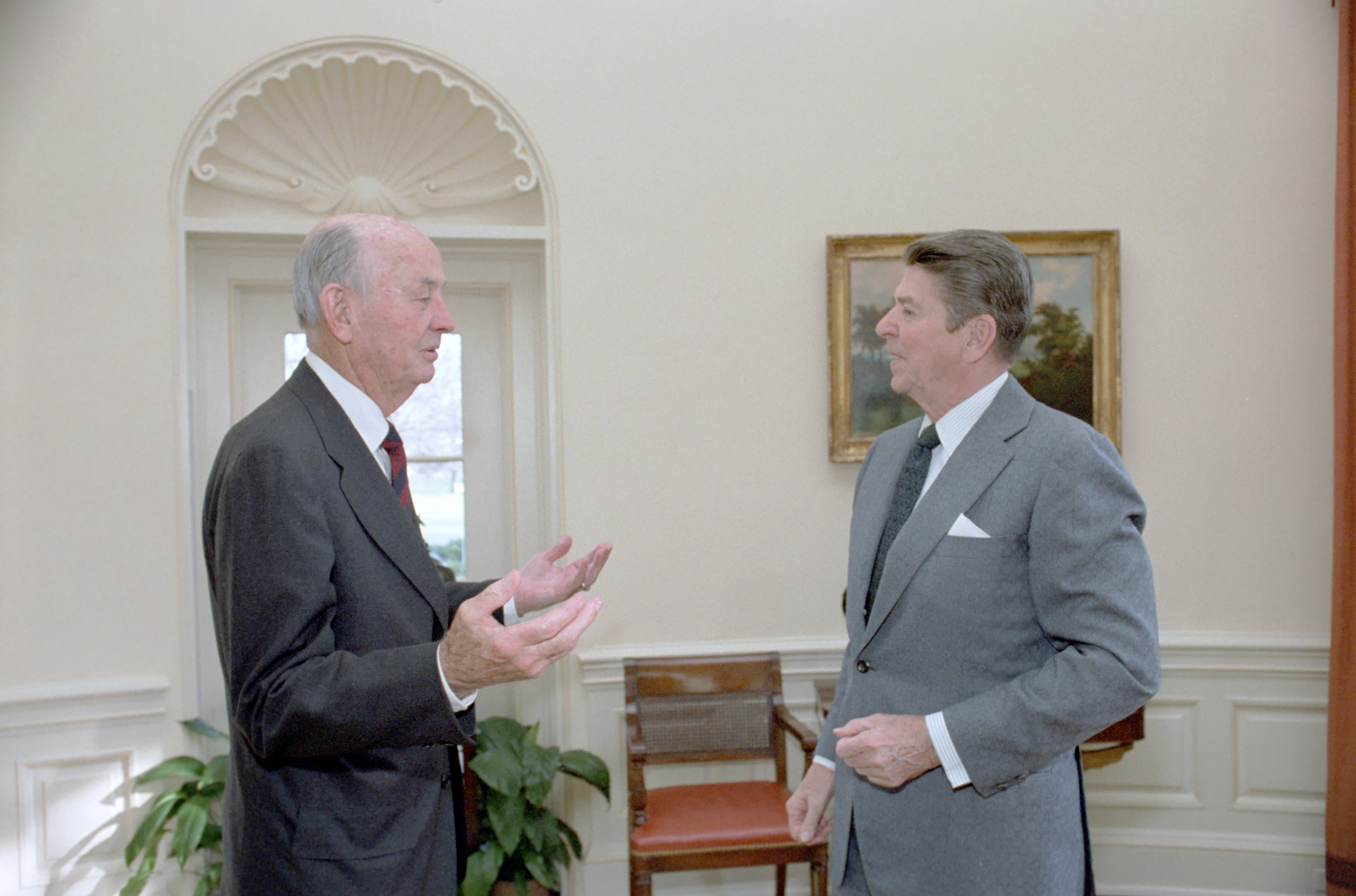
Tuttle with President Ronald Reagan in 1983

Though he never held public office, Tuttle was very involved in political affairs of the times. His political involvement began in 1952, when he campaigned for General Dwight D. Eisenhower. He later campaigned for Richard Nixon, Barry Goldwater, and Gerald Ford as well. According to his son, Robert Tuttle, Holmes was a delegate to every Republican National Convention from 1960 to 1984.

Tuttle led a group of California businessmen as they encouraged movie actor Ronald Reagan to run for Governor of California in 1966. His reasoning was, "Would you rather vote for a candidate who has spent his life in politics, has never really worked for a living, or created jobs in the private sector while clawing his way to the top and who is beholden to many other politicians for his success in Washington? Or would you rather have a candidate who is backed by very successful capitalists who have created dozens of companies and tens of thousands of jobs, people who know what it takes to attain success within our system?"

Upon Reagan's election, Tuttle assisted in screening people for cabinet positions. He later worked on Reagan's 1976 and 1980 presidential campaigns. When Reagan was sworn in as president in 1981, Tuttle and fellow businessman Justin Whitlock Dart "sat down with the President and gave our impression of the budget. We keep saying the same thing: cut, cut and then cut some more."

== Family ==
His son Robert Holmes Tuttle worked in the White House under President Reagan, and was later Ambassador to the UK during George W. Bush's second term.

His grandnephew is Jim Click, one of the largest auto dealers in southern Arizona.

Holmes Tuttle was Chickasaw and was inducted into the Chickasaw Hall of Fame in 2017.

== Death ==
Tuttle died at Cottage Hospital in Montecito, California, aged 83 in 1989. According to his son, Tuttle died of complications stemming from a stroke he suffered several weeks prior.
