= John S. Herrington =

American politician (born 1939)

John Herrington
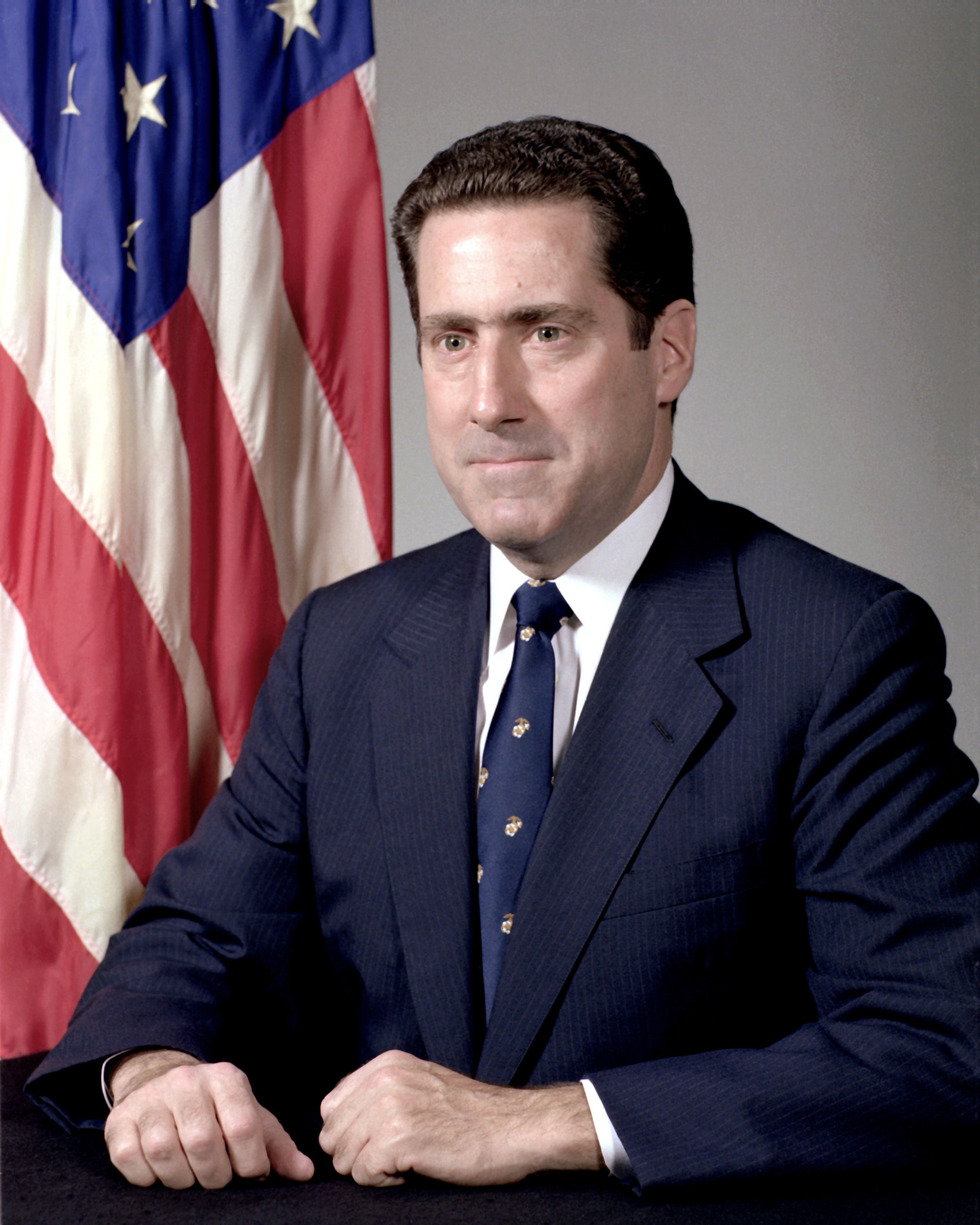

Chair of the California Republican Party
- In office 1995–1997
- Preceded by: Tirso del Junco
- Succeeded by: Michael Schroeder

5th United States Secretary of Energy
- In office February 7, 1985 – January 20, 1989
- President: Ronald Reagan
- Preceded by: Donald P. Hodel
- Succeeded by: James D. Watkins

Director of the White House Presidential Personnel Office
- In office February 1983 – February 7, 1985
- President: Ronald Reagan
- Preceded by: Pendleton James
- Succeeded by: Robert H. Tuttle

Assistant Secretary of the Navy for Manpower and Reserve Affairs
- In office October 1981 – February 1983
- President: Ronald Reagan
- Preceded by: Joseph A. Doyle
- Succeeded by: Chapman B. Cox

Personal details
- Born: John Stewart Herrington; May 31, 1939 (age 87) Los Angeles, California, U.S.
- Party: Republican
- Spouse: Lois Haight
- Children: 2
- Education: Stanford University (BA); University of California, Hastings (LLB)

Military service
- Allegiance: United States
- Branch/service: United States Marine Corps
- Rank: First Lieutenant

John Stewart Herrington (born May 31, 1939) is an American Republican politician and businessman who served as the fifth United States secretary of energy under Ronald Reagan during his second term.

== Biography ==
Herrington was born in Los Angeles, California, and earned his A.B. at Stanford University in 1961 and his LLB at the University of California School of Law (Hastings College) in 1964. While attending Stanford University, he joined the Delta Upsilon fraternity. He practiced law privately from 1965 to 1981, primarily in San Francisco, and publicly as deputy district attorney of Ventura County.

In the Reagan Administration, Herrington served as Assistant Secretary of the Navy (Manpower and Reserve Affairs) from 1981 to 1983, deputy assistant for presidential personnel from 1983 to 1985, and Secretary of Energy from 1985 to 1989.

During his tenure as Secretary of Energy, he was responsible for running the entire U.S. nuclear weapons complex at the height of the Cold War. He claims to have practiced rigorous budget oversight, noting that once while reviewing the budget, he discovered a highly classified, multi-billion dollar stealth fighter program (specifically the Lockheed F-117 Nighthawk) that had been hidden within the department's budget. Additionally, Herrington spearheaded the effort to shut down a secret Taiwanese nuclear weapons program and secured Reagan's authorization for the Superconducting Super Collider.

In 1991, Herrington was a founding board member of the Ronald Reagan Presidential Library, contributing significantly to the preservation of Reagan's legacy.

After government service, Herrington was the Chairman of Harcourt, Brace, Jovanovich, Inc. He remains active in politics in his home state, having served for a time as Chairman of the California Republican Party. He owns Vic Stewart's, a nationally recognized steakhouse, with locations in Contra Costa County: Walnut Creek and Brentwood. He also develops real estate and acts as an advisor to numerous corporations.

In the 2016 Republican Party presidential primaries, Herrington endorsed Ted Cruz. He also supported the appointment of former Texas Governor Rick Perry as Secretary of Energy by President Donald Trump in December 2016.

Herrington is an active member of the Bohemian Club.

== Personal life and family ==
Herrington and his wife, the Honorable Lois Haight, had two children.

Government offices
Preceded by Joseph A. Doyle	Assistant Secretary of the Navy for Manpower and Reserve Affairs; 1981–1983	Succeeded by Chapman B. Cox
Political offices
Preceded by Donald Hodel	United States Secretary of Energy; 1985–1989	Succeeded by James D. Watkins
Party political offices
Preceded by Tirso del Junco	Chair of the California Republican Party; 1995–1997	Succeeded by Michael Schroeder
U.S. order of precedence (ceremonial)
Preceded by William Bennett as Former U.S. Cabinet Member	Order of precedence of the United States as Former U.S. Cabinet Member	Succeeded by Edwin Meese as Former U.S. Cabinet Member
