= EarthSpark International =

US-based nonprofit organization

- Formation: 2008
- Founder: Daniel Schnitzer
- Founded at: Haiti
- Type: Nonprofit
- Purpose: Reliable Electricity, Eradicate Energy Poverty
- Headquarters: Washington, D.C.
- Location: Haiti
- Website: www.earthsparkinternational.org

EarthSpark International is a 501(c)(3) nonprofit organization focused on expanding access to sustainable energy in underserved communities, particularly in Haiti. The organization develops solar-powered micro grids to provide reliable and affordable electricity in areas lacking traditional energy infrastructure in Haiti.

== Background ==
EarthSpark International was founded in 2008 with the aim of addressing energy poverty through innovative electrification solutions. The organization worked on distributing solar-powered lanterns and cook stoves in the start before shifting its focus to community-scale micro grids. In 2012, EarthSpark launched first solar-powered micro grids in the town of Les Anglais in Haiti, providing electricity to households and businesses previously reliant on expensive diesel generators.

== Funding and partnerships ==
EarthSpark International has received support from various international agencies and development organizations. The United States Trade and Development Agency (USTDA) has backed EarthSpark's efforts to expand rural electricity access in Haiti, funding feasibility studies and technical assistance for micro grid development.

== Recognition ==
EarthSpark International has been recognized for its innovative work in sustainable energy access. The organization received the "Momentum for Change Award" from the United Nations Framework Convention on Climate Change (UNFCCC) in recognition of its Feminist Electrification approach to integrating gender considerations into rural energy development.
