= Mark Gregory Hambley =

American diplomat (born 1948)

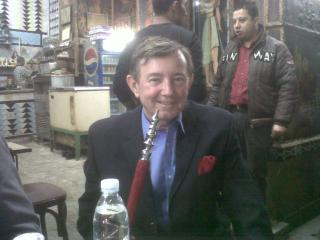
Mark G. Hambley in Benghazi

Mark Gregory Hambley (born February 12, 1948, in Boise, Idaho) is an American diplomat. During 32 years in the U.S. diplomatic service, Hon. Mark G Hambley served in fourteen different postings, many of them in Middle Eastern countries, including as U.S. Ambassador in Qatar and, later, in Lebanon and as the U.S. Consul General in Alexandria, Egypt, and in Jeddah, Saudi Arabia. Hambley was also posted in Saudi Arabia during the November 1979 Grand Mosque seizure. Other assignments took him to Vietnam, Yemen, Jordan, Tunisia and Libya during periods of war, coups, and civil unrest.

Hambley's five year service in multilateral diplomacy included his designation as the Special Representative to the UN Commission on Sustainable Development, as the U.S. representative to the Intergovernmental Panel on Forests, and as the Special Negotiator on climate change during the Kyoto process and early months of the Bush administration.

Following the September 11 attacks in 2001, Hambley served as political advisor to the commander of the U.S. Air Force deployment in the Middle East during the conflict against al-Qaeda and the Taliban in Afghanistan. He was then appointed as director of a newly-established Media Outreach Center in London in March 2003. This is a specialized unit created under the authority of the U.S. Congress in early that year. The goal of this center is to improve dialog with the pan-Arab media and to monitor the programming and coverage of various pan-Arab newspapers and satellite television networks.

Hambley left full-time government service in 2005. He still undertakes special commissions on an ad hoc basis, especially in the Middle East, North Africa and Asia. He is a founding partner of SoCoSIX Strategies LLC, a specialized risk management company. He serves on the executive committee of the Washington-based Middle East Policy Council which is well known for its Middle East Journal and its quarterly Capitol Hill conferences on Middle Eastern issues of importance to the United States.

As a trustee of the Next Century Foundation, he has undertaken private missions to war-torn Baghdad to facilitate negotiations with the late Abdul Aziz al Hakim and to Jerusalem during the 2006 Lebanon War, during which he discussed matters relating to Syrian second track negotiations. He has also been a member of delegations observing regional, provincial and national elections in Iraq since the Iraqi constitutional referendum, 2005 to the present time.

Hambley established and currently serves as Trustee and Treasurer of the Next Century Foundation/USA. In view of the destruction of important archaeological sites and the dangers confronting Yemeni heritage due to the ongoing civil war, Hambley founded The Arabia Felix Foundation (TAFF) in 2017 with the goal of preserving artifacts and images from Yemen especially and to promote the appreciation and preservation of both well into the future.

Hambley speaks and writes on topics related to the Middle East, including on the growing impact of radical Jihadi movements on the region and the United States, the continuing crisis in Yemen and the Arabian Peninsula generally, and the omnipresent danger posed by climate change and the way forward.

In 2012, he was awarded an Honorary Doctorate of Humane Letters by Elms College for his continuing work to promote peace and reconciliation among disputing parties in various corners of the world and, especially in the Middle East.

Hambley has been a special guest on The English Hour for ANN TV (Arab News Network) and appeared in numerous news items on radio and television stations ranging from the BBC to NPR, Alhurra, Al Jazeera, Al Arabiya and Press TV.

Hambley featured in an episode of Government Matters on Springfield Community Access Television. Producer and host Mike Dobbs conducted an insightful interview covering Hambley's Middle East experiences, ISIS, city governance, perceptions of Americans and religious minorities, changing US attitudes, Jerusalem recognition, Middle East power dynamics, geography education, media coverage, and the cultural loss in the region due to conflict.

Diplomatic posts
Preceded by Joseph Ghougassian	United States Ambassador to Qatar; 1989–1992	Succeeded by Kenton Keith
Preceded by Ryan Crocker	United States Ambassador to Lebanon; 1993–1994	Succeeded by Vincent M. Battle
