= Elizabeth Davenport McKune =

American diplomat

United States Ambassador to Qatar
- In office 1998–2001
- President: Bill Clinton; George W. Bush
- Preceded by: Patrick N. Theros
- Succeeded by: Maureen E. Quinn

Personal details
- Born: November 15, 1947 (age 77); Detroit, Michigan

Elizabeth Davenport McKune (born November 15, 1947, in Detroit, Michigan) is a Career Foreign Service Officer who served as the United States Ambassador to Qatar from 1998 until 2001. She retired in 2006. In 2007, she became executive director of the Sultan Qaboos Cultural Center (SQCC) in Washington, D.C.

== Early life ==
McKune's parents are Colonel Clarence M. Davenport Jr. (a West Point graduate) and Yolande Davenport (née Bradfield - a National Institute of Mental Health psychiatric social worker).

== Education ==
- B.A., Carleton College, Minnesota, 1970
- M.A., Johns Hopkins School of Advanced International Studies 1972
- National War College, with distinction, 1993
