= Robert H. Tuttle =

American businessman and diplomat

Robert Tuttle
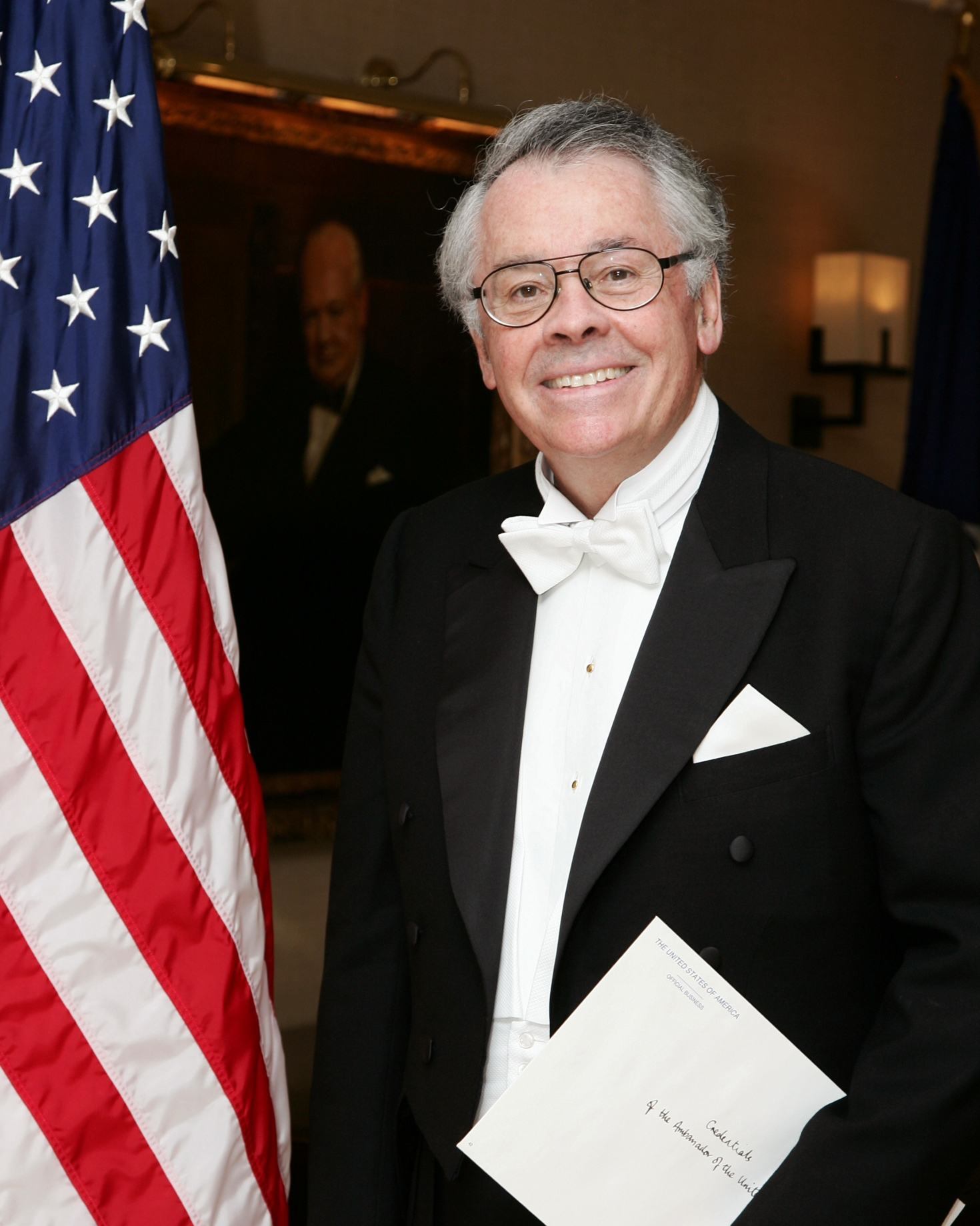

United States Ambassador to the United Kingdom
- In office October 19, 2005 – February 6, 2009
- President: George W. Bush; Barack Obama
- Preceded by: William Farish
- Succeeded by: Louis Susman

Director of the White House Presidential Personnel Office
- In office February 7, 1985 – January 20, 1989
- President: Ronald Reagan
- Preceded by: John S. Herrington
- Succeeded by: Chase Untermeyer

Personal details
- Born: Robert Holmes Tuttle; August 4, 1943 (age 82) California, U.S.
- Party: Republican
- Spouse: Maria Hummer
- Children: 2
- Education: Stanford University (BA); University of Southern California (MBA)

Robert Holmes Tuttle (born August 4, 1943) is an American businessman specializing in car dealerships. He was the United States Ambassador to the United Kingdom from July 2005 to February 2009.

== Early life and career ==
Tuttle earned a Bachelor of Arts from Stanford University, and earned his Master of Business Administration degree at the University of Southern California. Tuttle is the son of Holmes Tuttle, founder of the Southern California chain of auto dealerships and, in the 1960s and 1970s, a prominent force behind the political rise of actor Ronald Reagan. Tuttle previously worked in the White House during the Reagan administration as an assistant to the President in 1982, and director of presidential personnel in 1985. An avid tennis player, he enjoyed occasional games of tennis at the White House tennis court. Tuttle was also on the board of directors of the Woodrow Wilson International Center for Scholars.

== Diplomatic career ==
=== United States Ambassador to the United Kingdom ===
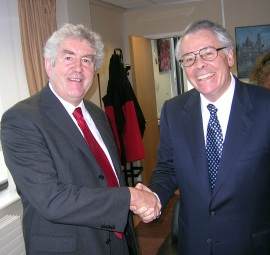
Former First Minister of Wales Rhodri Morgan meets U.S. Ambassador Robert Tuttle on October 7, 2005, in Cardiff.

A California native, he was nominated to be ambassador by U.S. President George W. Bush. He had raised more than $200,000 for Bush's 2004 presidential campaign and inauguration ceremony. Both Tuttle and his predecessor William Stamps Farish III were both wealthy private citizens with personal and financial ties to the Bush family.

==== Controversy over congestion fee ====
Tuttle was the Ambassador to the United Kingdom during the U.S. Embassy's refusal to pay the London congestion charge. The embassy has claimed that the charge is a form of taxation, and the diplomats and their staff are therefore exempt under the 1961 Vienna Convention on Diplomatic Relations. Transport for London, which is headed by the Mayor of London, considers the charge to be a fee for service rather than a tax, and points out that other embassies in London pay it, and US embassies in other cities pay similar road charges.

In March 2006, the Mayor of London, Ken Livingstone, said that Tuttle was trying to "skive out of [paying] like some chiselling little crook". A survey published in 2007 showed that the United States owed £1.5 million in outstanding congestion charge payments. Livingstone again chided Tuttle, and called him a "venal little crook" for his refusal to pay.

=== Later career ===
Tuttle is a partner in the Tuttle-Click Automotive Group based in Irvine, California, and the Jim Click Automotive Group based out of Tucson, Arizona. He currently serves as the chairman of the board of directors of the Pacific Council on International Policy. He is a trustee of the Center for the Study of the Presidency and Congress in Washington, D.C.

In 2020, Tuttle, along with over 130 other former Republican national security officials, signed a statement that asserted that President Trump was unfit to serve another term, and "To that end, we are firmly convinced that it is in the best interest of our nation that Vice President Joe Biden be elected as the next President of the United States, and we will vote for him."

== Personal life ==
He is married to the former Maria Denise Hummer. Tuttle and his wife are both avid collectors of contemporary art.

Political offices
Preceded by John S. Herrington	Director of the White House Presidential Personnel Office; 1985–1989	Succeeded by Chase Untermeyer
Diplomatic posts
Preceded by William Stamps Farish III	United States Ambassador to the United Kingdom; 2005–2009	Succeeded by Louis Susman
