= Kenton W. Keith =

American diplomat (born 1939)

Kenton Wesley Keith (born November 12, 1939) is a former American career diplomat and ambassador to Qatar from 1992 to 1995. A U.S. Navy veteran, Keith also served as Senior Vice president of programming for the American Academy of Diplomacy. Ambassador Keith has been awarded two presidential service awards and is a Chevalier in the French Order of Arts and Letters.

== Personal life ==
Keith was born on November 12, 1939, in Kansas City, Missouri. His mother, Gertrude Keith, was a civil servant and one of the first African-American women to attend college in the United States. His father, Jimmy Keith, was a Jazz saxophonist and a legend on the Kansas City jazz scene. Keith attended the racially segregated Lincoln High School in Kansas City and was later a student at The University of Kansas where he earned a degree in International Relation and French in 1961. During his time there Keith also completed the Naval Reserve Officer Training Corps program, which later led to a career as a lieutenant in the U.S. Navy. In June 1963, Keith married Brenda Ayo. Keith and Ayo had two children a son, Vincent, and a daughter, Pamela.

Keith is a member of Alpha Phi Alpha fraternity. He is a member of the fraternity's World Policy Council, a think tank whose purpose is to expand Alpha Phi Alpha's involvement in politics and social and current policy to encompass international concerns.

Diplomatic posts
Preceded by Mark Gregory Hambley	U.S. Ambassador to Qatar; 1992–1995	Succeeded by Patrick N. Theros
