= Protestantism in Qatar =

Qatar has a population of approximately 3 million people. About 13.7% (409,000 people) are Christian. This includes a large number of migrant workers who follow Catholic, Orthodox or Protestant beliefs. In 2000, the number of Protestants was estimated at 1% of the population and the Anglicans (being classified otherwise there) at 1.4% for the same year.

A hospital was founded in Doha in 1947, in cooperation with Protestants, in particular one started by Mary Bruins Allison, (a missionary doctor from the Reformed Church of America).

In May 2005, five Christian Churches (including the Anglican Church in Qatar) were officially recognized by the Qatari government of Qatar. Smaller denominations are not recognised by the government, but are allowed to hold services if they do so under the protection of a recognised church.

The Anglican church was then given permission to build the Anglican Centre and the centre opened in 2013. The centre has 26 different worship spaces with 15,000 seating capacity and is used by more than 85 Christian groups, including several Evangelical, Pentecostal and other Protestant congregations. During a normal week, there are between 16,000-25,000 worshippers from 65 countries in over 150 worship services.

Christian religious literature in English is available in bookstores. However, proselytizing is illegal, with a punishment of up to seven years in prison.

The Evangelical Churches Alliance Qatar (ECAQ) has approximately 1,200 members who hail primarily from the Philippines, Nigeria, Kenya, India, Indonesia and Malaysia.

== Denominations ==
- Episcopal Church in Jerusalem and the Middle East, a province of the Anglican Communion
  - Diocese of Cyprus and the Gulf, the Anglican diocese in which Qatar is located
- Arab Evangelical Church
- Charismatic movement
- Christian Brethren and other free churches
- Church of South India
- Lutheranism
- Pentecostalism
- Presbyterianism
- Redeemed Christian Church of God

Qatar has granted legal status to Anglican and Filipino Evangelical and Indian Christian churches. Denominations are registered under the aegis of the Anglican Church. Ninety house churches are allocated to members of the Evangelical Church Alliance in Qatar.

== Languages of worship ==
- Arabic
- English
- German
- Hindi
- Igbo
- Indonesian
- Kannada
- Malayalam
- Nepali
- Punjabi
- Portuguese
- Sinhala
- Swahili
- Tagalog
- Tamil
- Telugu

== Public Gatherings ==
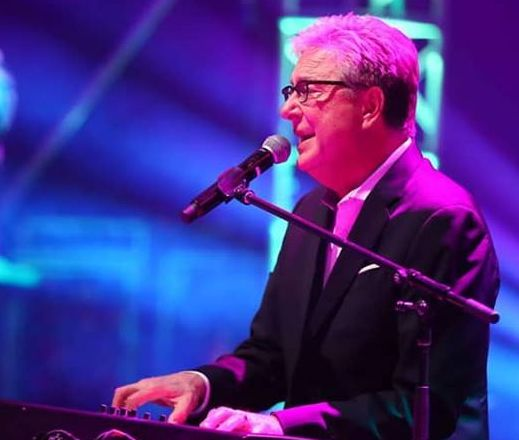
Don Moen Live in Qatar

An open air public gathering, where about 12,000 people gathered at the Asian Town Amphitheater Stadium for the Don Moen concert (festival of peace) on November 30 and December 1, 2018. It was organized by Route 58:12, a group of individuals from various church backgrounds.

Other high-profile gatherings include;

- Hillsong concert on December 10, 2016, when approximately 10,000 people gathered at Asian Town Amphitheater Stadium.
- Planetshakers concert in May 2017 with an audience of about 4,000 people at Ali Bin Hamad al-Attiyah Arena.

== See also ==
- Christianity in Qatar
- Religion in Qatar
- Catholic Church in Qatar
- Freedom of religion in Qatar
- Protestantism by country
