= Chapman B. Cox =

American politician (born 1940)

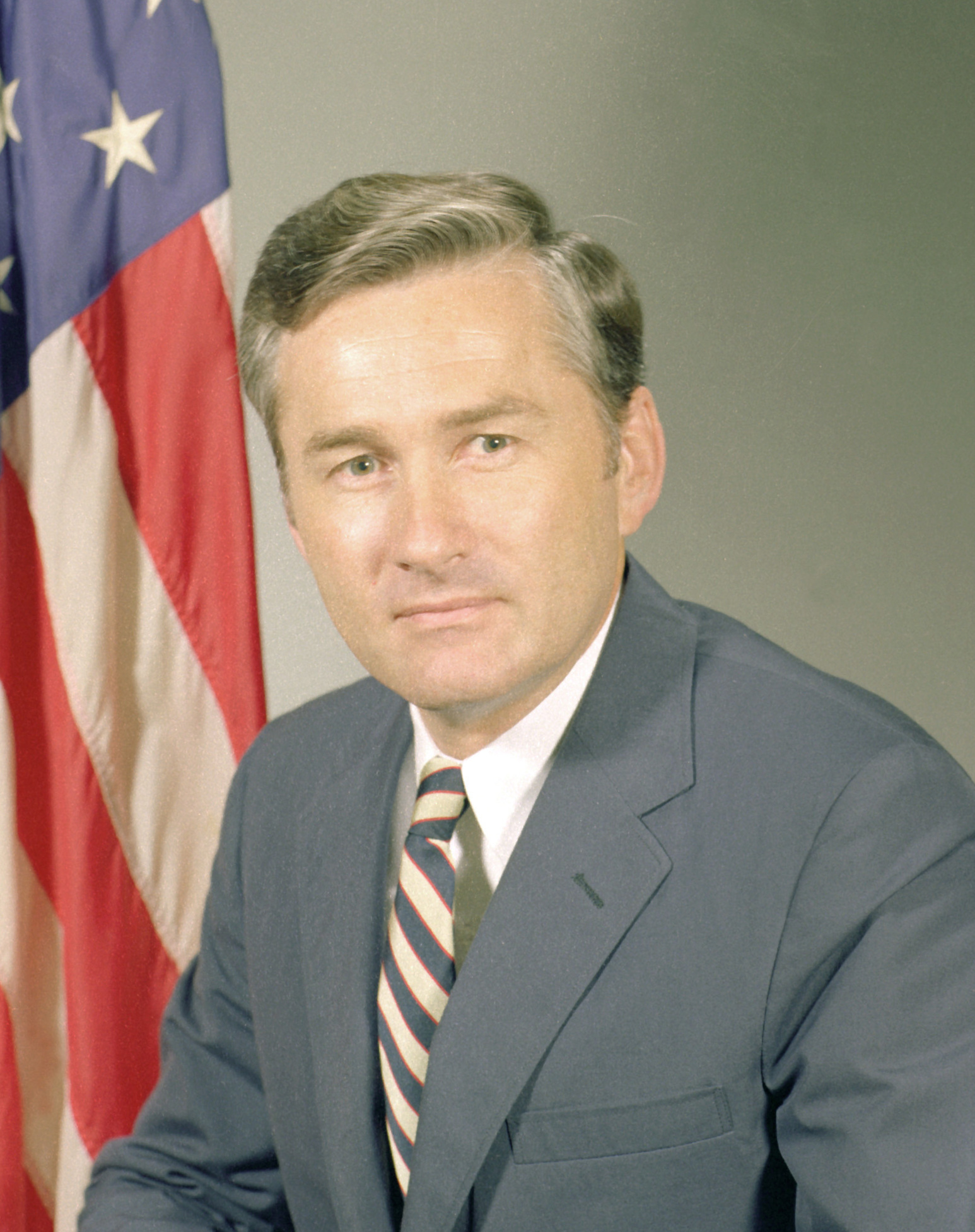
- Cox in May 1983

General Counsel of the Department of Defense
- In office May 3, 1984 – December 16, 1985
- President: Ronald Reagan
- Preceded by: Lawrence J. Korb
- Succeeded by: Henry L. Garrett III

Assistant Secretary of the Navy for Manpower and Reserve Affairs
- In office February 1983 – December 1984
- Preceded by: John S. Herrington
- Succeeded by: Chase Untermeyer

Personal details
- Born: Chapman Beecher Cox; July 31, 1940 (age 86) Dayton, Ohio, U.S
- Children: 2
- Education: University of Southern California; (B.A); Harvard Law School; (Juris Doctor)

Chapman Beecher Cox (born July 31, 1940) is an American politician who served as General Counsel of the Department of Defense from May 1984 to December 1985.

He was nominated by Ronald Reagan. He succeeded Lawrence J. Korb, and has also served as the Pentagon's Assistant Secretary for Force Management and Personnel. He previously served as the Assistant Secretary of the Navy for Manpower and Reserve Affairs from June 1983 to June 1984.

== Life ==
Chapman Beecher Cox was born on July 31, 1940 in Dayton, Ohio. Chapman graduated from the University of Southern California with a Bachelor of Arts in 1962. He then went to Harvard Law School and got a Juris Doctor degree. He has two children, and currently resides in Arlington, Virginia.
