= Catholic Church in Qatar =

The Catholic Church in Qatar is part of the worldwide Catholic Church. Building in 2008.

== History ==
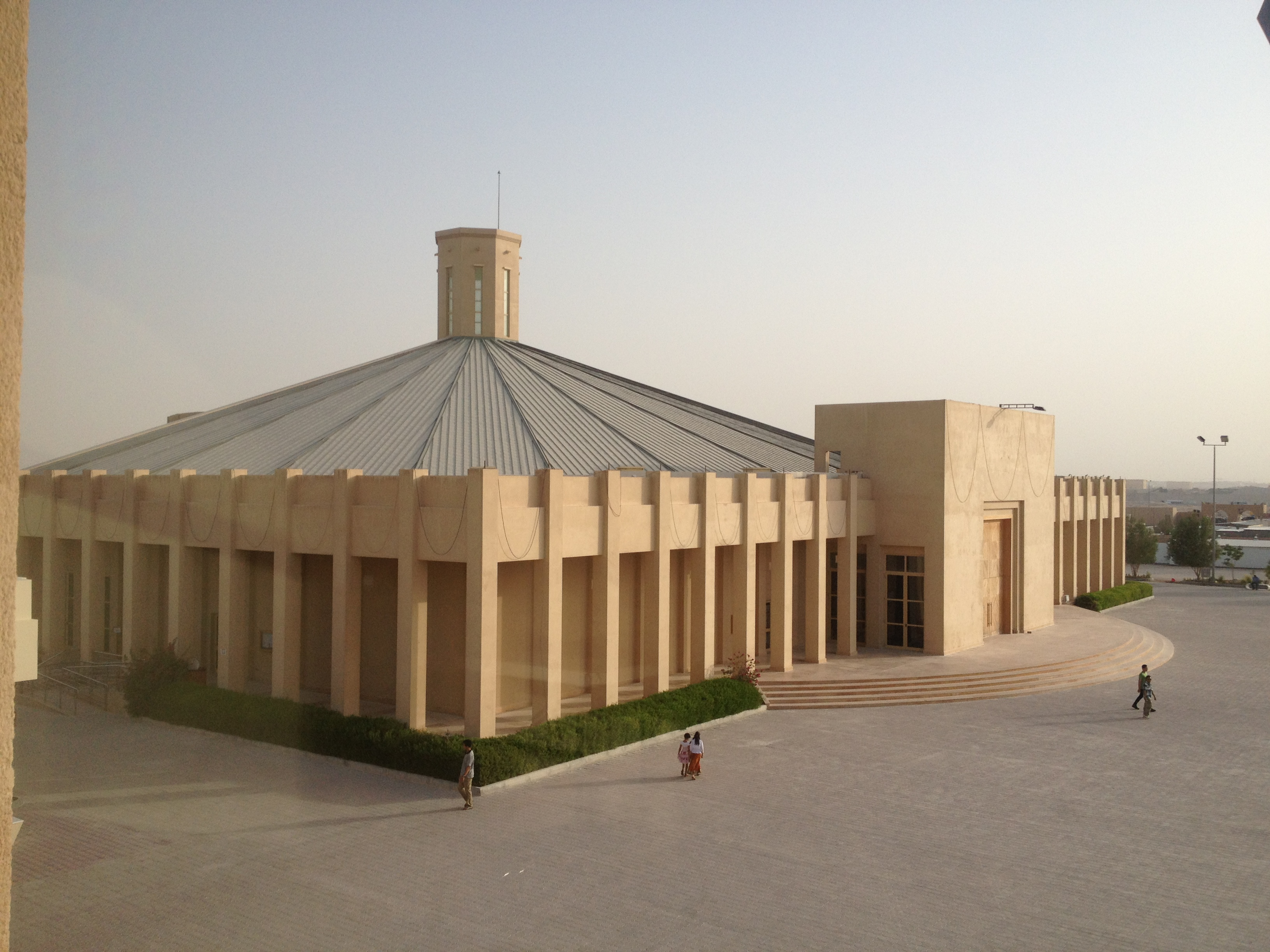
Catholic Church of Our Lady of the Rosary (Doha).

Qatar forms part of the Apostolic Vicariate of Northern Arabia.

In 2023, there are about 350,000 Catholics in Qatar (including 9 priests), most of whom are expatriate workers from the Philippines, Europe and India.

Our Lady of the Rosary, the first Catholic church in Qatar, and also the first in an Arab Muslim emirate, was dedicated in the capital, Doha, on March 14, 2008. The church cost $15 million to build and received contributions from Catholics throughout the Arabian Peninsula. Previously, Catholics and other Christians were limited to informal group meetings in homes. Catholic Mass is offered there in nine different languages. Priests have noted that most services are held on Fridays.

There are two Eastern Catholic Churches, St. Mary’s Malankara Catholic Church and St. Thomas Syro-Malabar Church.

== See also ==
- Religion in Qatar
- Christianity in Qatar
- Protestantism in Qatar
- Freedom of religion in Qatar
- Christianity in the Middle East
- Christianity in Eastern Arabia
