= Church of Our Lady of the Rosary (Doha) =

Catholic Church in Doha, Qatar

Coordinates: 25.2126°N 51.5219°E

Rosary Church, Doha
- Catholic Church of our Lady of the Rosary كنيسة سيدة المسبحة
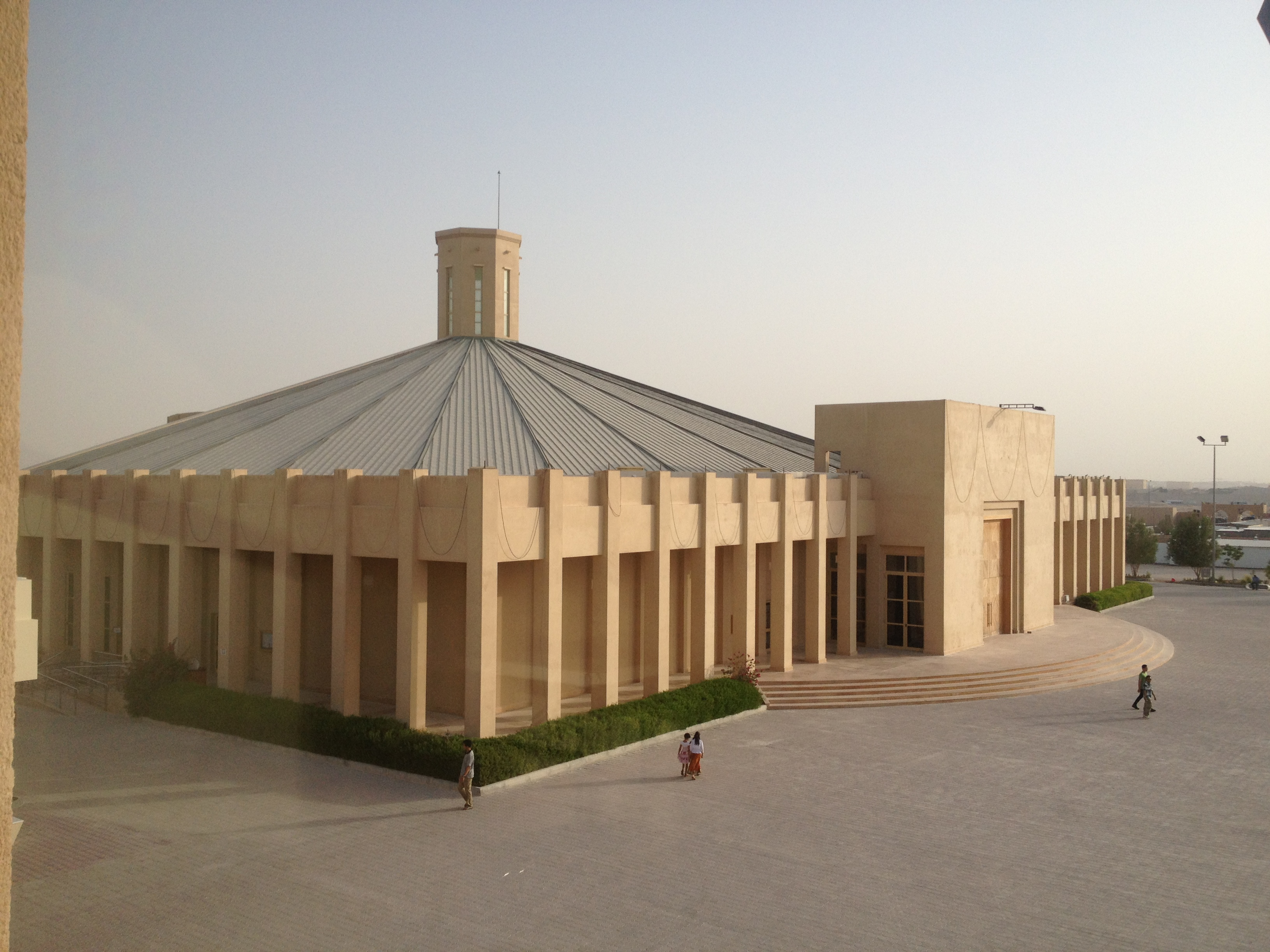
- Church facade
- Rosary Church, Doha
- Location: Abu Hamour, Doha
- Country: Qatar
- Denomination: Catholic Church
- Sui iuris church: Latin Church
- Website: https://qatarcatholicchurch.org/home

History
- Consecrated: 15 March 2008

Specifications
- Capacity: 2 700

Administration
- Division: Apostolic Vicariate of Northern Arabia

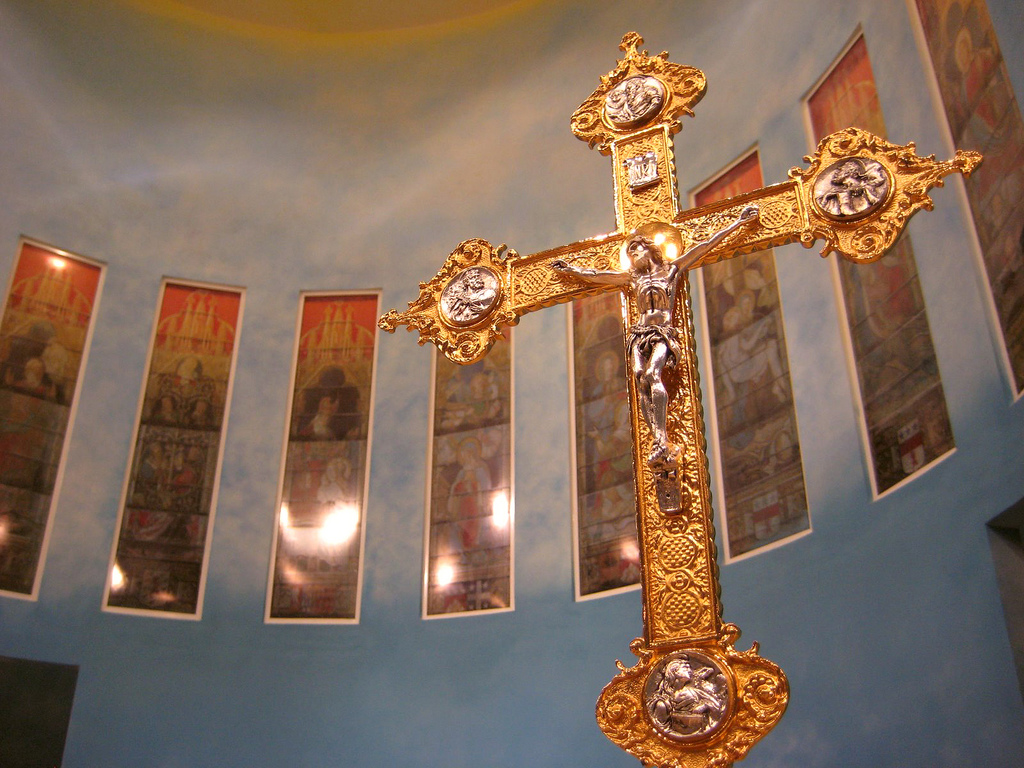
Crucifix inside the church

The Catholic Church of Our Lady of the Rosary (Arabic: كنيسة سيدة المسبحة) is a Catholic church in Doha, Qatar. It is located, along with churches of other Christian denominations, at the Religious Complex in Abu Hamour. It is the first church built in the country since the Muslim conquests in the 7th century.

The church was constructed at a cost of around $20 million on land donated by the Emir of Qatar, Hamad bin Khalifa Al Thani. Due to the laws in Islamic Qatar, the church displays no Christian symbols like crosses, bells, or a steeple on its exterior.

The church was dedicated on 14 March 2008, by Cardinal Ivan Dias, prefect of the Congregation for the Evangelisation, in a ceremony attended by Qatari Deputy Prime Minister Abdullah Bin Hamad Al-Attiyah; Archbishop Mounged Al Hachem, the ambassador of the Holy See to the Gulf; Bishop Paul Hinder, Apostolic Vicariate of Arabia; Archbishop Giuseppe Andrea, former nuncio of the Holy See to the region; and several Qatari officials.

The church is part of the Apostolic Vicariate of Northern Arabia and serves around 200,000 Catholics in Qatar, most of them migrant workers from the Philippines, India, South America, Africa, Lebanon and Europe.

== See also ==
- Catholic Church in Qatar
- Freedom of religion in Qatar
