= Chase Untermeyer =

American politician (born 1946)

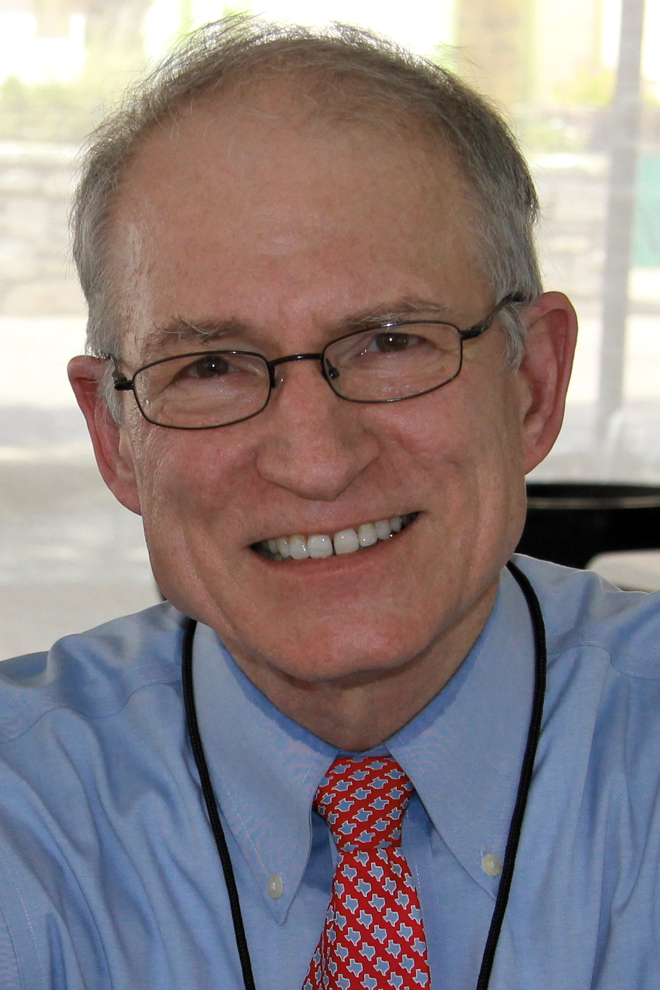

United States Ambassador to Qatar
- In office December 7, 2004 – August 19, 2007
- President: George W. Bush
- Preceded by: Maureen E. Quinn
- Succeeded by: Joseph LeBaron

Director of the White House Presidential Personnel Office
- In office January 20, 1989 – August 24, 1991
- President: George H. W. Bush
- Preceded by: Robert H. Tuttle
- Succeeded by: Constance Horner

Assistant Secretary of the Navy for Manpower and Reserve Affairs
- In office December 1984 – April 1988
- President: Ronald Reagan
- Preceded by: Chapman B. Cox
- Succeeded by: Kenneth Bergquist

Member of the Texas House of Representatives from the 83rd district
- In office January 11, 1977 – January 13, 1981
- Preceded by: Larry Vick
- Succeeded by: Ashley Smith

Personal details
- Born: Charles Graves Untermeyer; March 7, 1946 (age 80) Long Branch, New Jersey, U.S.
- Party: Republican
- Education: Harvard University (BA)

Charles Graves "Chase" Untermeyer (born March 7, 1946), is a former United States ambassador to Qatar. He was given a recess appointment by U.S. President George W. Bush and assumed the position on August 2, 2004. After three years, he was succeeded by Joseph LeBaron.

== Biography ==
A native of Long Branch, New Jersey, Untermeyer graduated in 1964 from Memorial High School in Houston, Texas and, later (1968), from Harvard University in Cambridge, Massachusetts. While at Harvard, he worked in the 1966 congressional campaign of future U.S. President George Herbert Walker Bush of Houston.

He entered the United States Navy after Harvard under the Naval Reserve Officer Training Corps program. He served during the Vietnam War as an officer aboard the Pacific Fleet destroyer USS Benner (DD-807) and as aide and flag lieutenant to the late Rear Admiral Draper L. Kauffman, Commander of U.S. Naval Forces in the Philippines.

Returning to Houston, Untermeyer was a reporter for the Houston Chronicle and executive assistant to the county judge of Harris County, Texas. In 1976, he was elected as a Republican to the Texas House of Representatives from Houston, serving until 1981, when he went to Washington. There he served as executive assistant to then-Vice President George H.W. Bush, 1981-1983; Deputy Assistant Secretary of the Navy for Installations and Facilities, 1983-1984; Assistant Secretary of the Navy for Manpower and Reserve Affairs, 1984-1988; assistant to the President and Director of the Office of Presidential Personnel, 1989-1991; and Director of the Voice of America, 1991-1993.

Returning once more to Houston, Untermeyer was Director of Public Affairs for Compaq from 1993 to 2002, and Vice President for Government Affairs and professor of public policy at the University of Texas Health Science Center at Houston from 2002 to 2004.

His part-time public positions include: member and chairman of the United States Naval Academy Board of Visitors, 1993-1996; member of the Houston Port Commission, 1995-1998; member of the board of directors of National Public Radio (NPR), 1996-1998; member of the Texas State Board of Education, 1999-2003, serving as chairman from 1999-2001; member of the board of the Conservation Trust of Puerto Rico (Fideicomiso de Conservación de Puerto Rico), 2002-2004; member of the Defense Health Board, 2008-2009; founding board member of the Episcopal Health Foundation, 2013-2016; and founding chairman of the Qatar-America Institute, 2017-2019. He is currently a member of the Council on Foreign Relations and chairman of the board of Humanities Texas, the state humanities council.

He married the former Diana Cumming Kendrick of Sheridan, Wyoming, in 1990. They have a daughter, Ellyson Chase Untermeyer (born in 1993).

== Works ==
- When Things Went Right: The Dawn of the Reagan-Bush Administration; Chase Untermeyer; Texas A&M University Press (August 8, 2013); ISBN 1623490138
- How Important People Act: Behaving Yourself in Public; Chase Untermeyer; Bright Sky Press (February 1, 2015); ISBN 1939055962
- Inside Reagan's Navy: The Pentagon Journals; Chase Untermeyer; Texas A&M University Press (April 7, 2015); ISBN 1623492122
- Zenith: In the White House with George H. W. Bush; Chase Untermeyer; Texas A&M University Press (August 24, 2016); ISBN 9781623494360

Government offices
Preceded by Chapman B. Cox	Assistant Secretary of the Navy for Manpower and Reserve Affairs; 1984–1988	Succeeded by Kenneth Bergquist
Political offices
Preceded by Robert H. Tuttle	Director of the White House Presidential Personnel Office; 1989–1991	Succeeded by Constance Horner
Diplomatic posts
Preceded by Maureen E. Quinn	United States Ambassador to Qatar; 2004–2007	Succeeded by Joseph LeBaron
