= Maureen E. Quinn =

American diplomat

United States Ambassador to Qatar
- In office 2001–2004
- President: George W. Bush
- Preceded by: Elizabeth Davenport McKune
- Succeeded by: Chase Untermeyer

Maureen E. Quinn is a career member of the Senior Foreign Service who served as the United States Ambassador to Qatar from 2001 to 2004. From there, she became the State Department's Coordinator for Afghanistan in the Bureau of South Asian Affairs. She was also Chargé d'Affaires in Rabat, Morocco.

== Education ==
A native of Spring Lake, New Jersey, Quinn earned a B.A. in French and Economics at Newcomb College, Tulane University and a M.S.F.S. at Georgetown University.

== Career ==
In 2011, Quinn became a Senior Adviser at the International Peace Institute. While at the State Department, Quinn also served as Acting Chief of Mission in Kabul. Stateside, her posts included Deputy Executive Secretary in the Executive Secretariat; Executive Assistant to the Under-Secretary for Economic Affairs and a Pearson Fellowship in the US House of Representatives.
