= Religion in Qatar =

Religion in Qatar (2022)
1. Islam (official) (65.2%)
2. Hinduism (15.9%)
3. Christianity (13.7%)
4. Buddhism (3.80%)
5. Other religions/Unaffiliated (1.40%)

Qatar is an Islamic state with several religious minorities, like other Arab Persian Gulf countries, which have massive non-citizen migrant worker populations. The official state religion is Sunni Islam. The religious community is made up of Sunni and Shi’a Muslims, Hindus, Christians, and small groups of Buddhists, Jews and Baháʼís. According to the 2022 USCIRF factsheet, Muslims form approximately 65.2% of the population, Hindus 15.9%, Christians 13.7% and Buddhists 3.8%, with several other small communities including Jews and Baháʼís. Qatar is also home to numerous other religions mostly from the Middle East and Asia.

Qatar hosts the Doha International Center for Interfaith Dialogue (DICID), which has organised annual conferences on interfaith dialogue between Muslim, Christian, and Jewish participants since 2003. International religious-freedom bodies have, however, noted a contrast between this public interfaith engagement and the unresolved legal status of several smaller communities, including Hindus, Buddhists, and Baháʼís, who lack authorised places of worship.

== Islam ==
The state religion in Qatar is Islam. Most Qataris belong to the Sunni sect of Islam. Shiites comprise around 10% of Qatar's Muslim population. Religious policy is set by the Ministry of Islamic Affairs and Islamic instruction is compulsory for Muslims in all state-sponsored schools.

The state mosque is the Mohammed Bin Abdul Wahab mosque, which is located in the Lejbailat neighbourhood and was designed by the Qatari architect Ibrahim Jaidah, drawing on traditional Qatari architecture.

The Abdulla Bin Zaid Al Mahmoud Islamic Cultural Center is located in the Al Souq neighbourhood of Doha, adjacent to Souq Waqif. The center provides Arabic lessons to beginners and intermediate speakers.

At the tertiary level, Islamic Studies is taught at Qatar University, and at Hamad Bin Khalifa University’s (HBKU) Faculty of Islamic Studies where a master's degree is offered. Sheikha Moza bint Nasser, the consort of the Father Emir and mother of the current Emir, is among its graduates.

Education City is also home to the Center for Islamic Legislation and Ethics (CILE), a think tank founded in 2012 and headed by Swiss political philosopher Professor Tariq Ramadan of the University of Oxford.

Islam’s role in scientific discovery has also been an area of interest for the Qatar Foundation, and recently, the Society for Muslim Scientists was established. In 2010, the joint venture between Bloomsbury Publishing and the Qatar Foundation began, publishing the book ‘Science in Islam’.

== Other religions ==
=== Hinduism ===
Hindus make up about 15.9% of Qatar's population per the 2022 USCIRF factsheet. Many Hindus are from South and Southeast Asia.

=== Christianity ===
The Christian community in Qatar is a diverse mix of European, North and South American, Asian, Middle Eastern and African expatriates. According to the 2022 USCIRF factsheet, Christians form approximately 13.7% of the total population, mainly made up of foreign workers from the Philippines, Europe, and India.

No foreign missionary groups operate openly in the country. In May 2005, the Qatari Government leased a piece of property on the outskirts of Doha to the representatives of Christian churches in the country for the construction of Church buildings. Eight Christian denominations are formally registered with the Ministry of Foreign Affairs; smaller congregations under 1,500 members cannot register independently and must affiliate as sub-groups of one of these registered denominations, worshipping at the Mesaymeer (also transliterated Maysameer) religious complex on the outskirts of Doha. A 2015 study estimates some 200 believers in Christ from a Muslim background, though not all of those are necessarily citizens.

=== Buddhism ===
In 2020, Buddhism was represented by between 1.8–3.8% of the population of Qatar, mainly comprising migrant workers from South, Southeast and East Asia, and estimated at approximately 100,000 adherents.

=== Baháʼí Faith ===
A small Baháʼí Faith community has been present in Qatar since the 1940s, predating the establishment of the modern Qatari state. USCIRF estimates the community at between 200 and 300 members of more than 30 nationalities, administered by a National Spiritual Assembly. The Qatari government has not granted the community legal recognition; the community has sought such recognition for approximately 80 years.

Since the early 2000s, UN Special Rapporteurs and Human Rights Watch have documented a pattern of deportations and non-renewal of residency permits targeting the community. In April 2026, the Baháʼí International Community reported that more than 40% of Qatar's remaining Baháʼí population was facing imminent expulsion through coordinated non-renewal of work permits. The community's National Spiritual Assembly chair, Remy Rowhani, was prosecuted and sentenced to five years in prison in August 2025, before being acquitted on appeal in October 2025. In July 2025, UN Special Rapporteurs issued a joint statement describing a "continuous pattern of targeted discrimination and persecution" against the community.

== Freedom of religion ==
In 2023, the country was scored 2 out of 4 for religious freedom by Freedom House.

== See also ==
- Catholic Church in Qatar
- Christianity in Qatar
- Freedom of religion in Qatar
- History of the Jews in Qatar
- Islam in Qatar
- Protestantism in Qatar
