= Patrick N. Theros =

American diplomat

Patrick Nickolas Theros (born August 21, 1941) is an American diplomat. He served as the United States Ambassador to Qatar from 1995 to 1998.

== Career ==
Theros was a career Foreign Service Officer from 1963 to 1999. Key positions he held in the Foreign Service include Ambassador to the State of Qatar, 1995–1998; Deputy Coordinator for Counterterrorism, responsible for the coordination of all U.S. Government counter-terrorism activities outside the United States, 1993–1995; Political Advisor to the Commander in Chief, Central Command, 1993 -1991; Deputy Chief of Mission and Political Officer in Amman, 1987–1991; Director, Politico-Military Affairs, State Department, 1983–1986; Chargé d'affaires and Deputy Chief of Mission in Abu Dhabi, 1980–1983; and Economic and Commercial Counselor in Damascus, Syria, 1976–1980. He also served in other diplomatic positions in Saudi Arabia, Lebanon, and Nicaragua, as well as in the Department of State.

In non-governmental positions, Theros served as the President, US Qatar Business Council, Washington, 2000-2017; General Partner, Theros & Theros LLP, Washington; Representative of the Greek Orthodox Patriarch of Jerusalem to the United States; Member of the Board of Advisors, Center for Contemporary Arab Studies, Georgetown University in Washington; Former Member of the Board of Directors, Qatar Foundation International; Member of the Council on Foreign Relations; Member of the Arab American Bankers Association of America; Member of the Washington Institute of Foreign Affairs; and Owner's representative, West Bank-Gaza-Jordan Fund. Member of the Order of St. Andrew.

Theros is active in promoting ties between the United States and Qatar. Upon retiring from the US Qatar Business Council in 2017, Theros took on responsibilities as Strategic Advisor to the Gulf International Forum, a Washington DC think tank focused on the Persian Gulf.

During the run-up to the 2003 invasion of Iraq, he spoke out strongly in opposition. He also appeared on many TV and radio programs speaking strongly against the invasion. He writes regular op-ed pieces for the Greek-American newspaper, The National Herald, in New York. He also appears as a guest speaker on AlJazeera, Al-Hurra and Al-Araby TV Satellite channels.

He is fluent in Spanish, Arabic, and Greek. Ambassador Theros is married to the former Aspasia Pahigiannis. They have one son and two daughters. Ambassador Theros attended public schools in Michigan, Ohio, and the District of Columbia. He graduated from Georgetown University's School of Foreign Service in 1963 and has done advanced study at the American University in Washington, D.C., and the Universidad Centroamericana in Managua. Ambassador Theros has also completed the Armed Forces Staff College at Norfolk, Virginia, and was appointed a Research Fellow at the National Defense University.

== Awards and honors ==
Theros has received four State Department Superior Honor Awards (1967, 1983, 1986, and 1992).

In 1967 he was awarded a Superior Honor Award for his heroic efforts to reach and rescue 147 American citizens trapped in crossfire between insurgents and the Nicaraguan National Guard in the Gran Hotel in Managua during an uprising in that year. He has also been awarded the Ellis Island Medal of Freedom (2003), Secretary of Defense Medal for Meritorious Civilian Service (1993), and the President's Meritorious Service Award for Career Officials (1992). State Department Superior Honor Awards:

Theros was awarded the President's Meritorious Service Award for Career Officials and the Secretary of Defense Medal for Meritorious Civilian Service in 1992, the Ellis Island Medal of Freedom in 2003, and was named a Knight Commander of the Order of the Holy Sepulchre in 1983, 1986, and 1992.

Greek Prime Minister Kyriakos Mitsotakis awarded Theros the rank of Commander, Order of the Phoenix, at a ceremony on September 23, 2026 in New York.

Diplomatic posts
Preceded by Kenton Keith	United States Ambassador to Qatar; 1995–1998	Succeeded by Elizabeth Davenport McKune
