= Louis Susman =

American diplomat

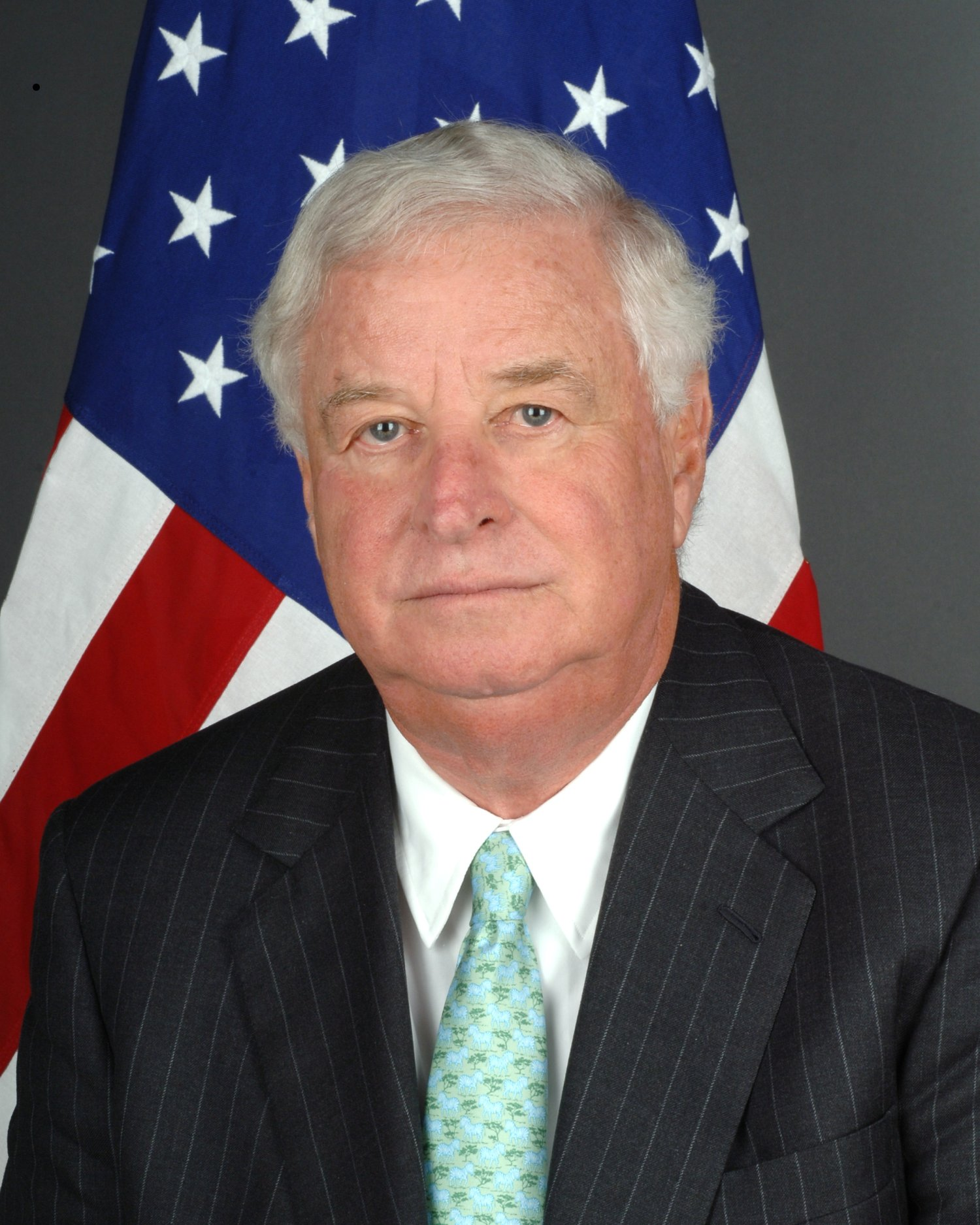
- official portrait, 2009

United States Ambassador to the United Kingdom
- In office October 13, 2009 – April 3, 2013
- President: Barack Obama
- Preceded by: Robert H. Tuttle
- Succeeded by: Matthew Barzun

Personal details
- Born: November 19, 1937 (age 88) St. Louis, Missouri, U.S.
- Party: Democratic
- Spouse: Marjorie (née Sachs)
- Education: University of Michigan; Washington University in St. Louis
- Profession: Attorney; Investment banker

Louis B. Susman (born November 19, 1937) is an American lawyer, retired investment banker, and the former United States Ambassador to the United Kingdom. Nominated by President Barack Obama, he was confirmed by the Senate on July 10, 2009, and sworn in by Secretary of State Hillary Clinton.

== Early life and education ==
Louis Susman was born on November 19, 1937. He graduated from the University of Michigan and earned his law degree from Washington University School of Law. He is a brother of Zeta Beta Tau.

== Career ==
Susman practiced law for 27 years and was a senior partner at the St. Louis-based law firm of Thompson & Mitchell, focusing on mergers and acquisitions and general corporate law.

Susman served on the Board of Directors and Management Committee for the St. Louis Cardinals baseball franchise from 1975 to 1989. He was appointed to the U.S. Advisory Commission on Public Diplomacy by Ronald Reagan in 1988, and served as a director of the Center for National Policy in Washington, D.C.

Susman later served the managing director and vice chairman of Citigroup Corporate and Investment Banking. In 2009, he retired as vice chairman of Citigroup Global Markets in Chicago.

Susman served as the U.S. Ambassador to the United Kingdom from 2009 to 2013. He had been a longtime fundraiser for Democratic Party candidates, including President Obama and 2004 presidential nominee John Kerry.

Susman served as a member of the Whitney R. Harris World Law Institute's International Council.

== Personal life ==
Susman married Marjorie Sachs. Their daughter, Sally Susman, is the executive vice president of corporate affairs at Pfizer.

Diplomatic posts
Preceded by Robert H. Tuttle	U.S. Ambassador to the United Kingdom; 2009–2013	Succeeded by Matthew Barzun
