= Joseph Ghougassian =

American diplomat (born 1944)

United States Ambassador to Qatar
- In office December 29, 1985 – June 30, 1989
- President: Ronald Reagan
- Preceded by: Charles Franklin Dunbar
- Succeeded by: Mark Gregory Hambley

Personal details
- Born: March 6, 1944 (age 82) Cairo, Egypt
- Party: Republican
- Education: Pontifical Gregorian University (BA, MA); UCLouvain (PhD); University of San Diego (JD, MA)
- Profession: Diplomat, academic

Joseph Antoine Ghougassian (born March 6, 1944) is an Egyptian Armenian-American academic, diplomat, and politician. Ghougassian served as the United States Ambassador to Qatar from 1985 to 1989.

== Education ==
Ghougassian received his bachelor's and master's degrees from Gregorian University in Rome, a PhD in philosophy from the University of Louvain, Belgium and a JD and MA in international relations from the University of San Diego.

== Foreign policy ==
In 1981, Ghougassian became a senior White House advisor on immigration and refugee policy. He advocated accommodations for temporary migrant workers approximating the lapsed Bracero Program, which Ronald Reagan eventually signed into law under the Immigration Reform and Control Act of 1986.

Ghougassian served as Peace Corps director in North Yemen from 1982 to 1985.

When he was confirmed in 1985, Ghougassian became the first naturalized United States citizen from the Middle East to become a U.S. Ambassador. Ghougassian made at least two protests to Emir Khalifa bin Hamad Al Thani over Qatar's refusal to return American-made FIM-92 Stinger missiles purchased on the black market, but received no response. This catalyzed a congressional ban on weapons sales, lasting until Qatar agreed to destroy the missiles during the coalition buildup for the 1991 Persian Gulf War. In September 1988, Ghougassian persuaded the Qatari government to end its prohibition against public Christian worship. As a result, he was made a Knighthood Commander of the Order of St. Gregory the Great by Pope John Paul II in 1989.

Ghougassian was an education advisor to the Coalition Provisional Authority during the Iraq War. As deputy of John Agresto in the Ministry of Higher Education and Scientific Research, his purview was reconstructing universities. Ghougassian supported the restoration of the Iraqi Museum of Natural History from looting damage. Ghougassian accompanied 25 Iraqi Fulbright Scholars to the White House for a meeting with President George W. Bush.

In August 2006, Ghougassian was appointed manager of USAID projects to strengthen the delivery of public utilities in Baghdad. In 2008, he was USAID's project leader for Afghanistan, introducing an "improved wheat" program to combat the cultivation of opium poppies. In 2009, Ghougassian was the acting director of the Office of Constitutional and Legislative Affairs at the United States Embassy in Baghdad.

== Academic career ==
From 1966 to 1980, Ghougassian was a professor of philosophy and psychology at the University of San Diego. While US Ambassador to Qatar, Ghougassian founded the American School of Doha. In 1997, Ghougassian was hired as provost of the Christian psychology-focused Trinity College of Graduate Studies at Mission San Luis Rey.

== Political involvement ==
In 1990, Ghougassian sought the Republican nomination for the U.S. House of Representatives in California's 44th congressional district, losing to former US Navy Commander Duke Cunningham. The Cunningham campaign was accused of racism for a mailer which tied Ghougassian to images of Muammar Ghaddafi, the Saudi royal family, and an oil barrel dripping dollars. Ghougassian was the Republican nominee in the December 28, 1993 special election for California's 40th senatorial district, but was defeated by Democratic Assemblyman Steve Peace.

== Personal life ==
In retirement, Ghougassian is a commercial tangelo grower in Escondido. During and since the COVID-19 pandemic, he has donated his harvests to food security nonprofit ProduceGood, totaling 3,700 pounds of fruit in 2024 alone.
