= National Export Initiative =

Economic strategy

The National Export Initiative (NEI) is a strategy created by the Obama administration to double U.S. exports between 2010 and the end of 2014 and support 2 million domestic jobs through increased intergovernmental cooperation in export promotion. The initiative was created by Executive Order 13534 after President Barack Obama called for the doubling of U.S. exports in his 2010 State of the Union address.

To further this initiative in its final months, President Obama signed Executive Order 13659 to streamline imports-exports. Among its requirements, the order created a timeline to change the U.S. trade data system from a paper to an electronic collection system. It is expected that import-export permit wait times will be cut from days to minutes.

== Departments ==
The NEI established the Export Promotion Cabinet, to be made up of the heads of at least 14 executive branch departments, agencies, and offices:

- Secretary of State
- Secretary of the Treasury
- Secretary of Agriculture
- Secretary of Commerce
- Secretary of Labor
- Director of the Office of Management and Budget;
- United States Trade Representative;
- Assistant to the President for Economic Policy;
- National Security Advisor;
- Chair of the Council of Economic Advisers
- President of the Export-Import Bank of the United States;
- Administrator of the Small Business Administration;
- President of the Overseas Private Investment Corporation;
- Director of the United States Trade and Development Agency; and
- heads of other executive branch departments, agencies, and offices as the President may, from time to time, designate

Trade Resources for Exporters:

- ExportUSA
- ThinkGlobal B2B Trade Leads

== Goals ==
The NEI goal of doubling U.S. exports between 2010 and the end of 2014 is intended to be accomplished by addressing eight specific items:

1. Increase export assistance to small and medium-sized enterprises (SMEs)
2. Promote federal resources currently available to assist U.S. companies
3. In consultation with state and local government officials, as well as the private sector, lead trade missions to promote American exports
4. Increase commercial advocacy by the federal government
5. In partnership with the Export-Import Bank, increase access to financing for SMEs who are looking to export
6. Macroeconomic rebalancing, by promoting balanced and strong growth in the world economy through international partnerships
7. Reduce barriers to trade and improve market access for domestic producers, by opening new markets and enforcing trade agreements
8. Create a framework to promote services trade
