= United States Trade and Development Agency =

Independent Agency of the United States Federal Government

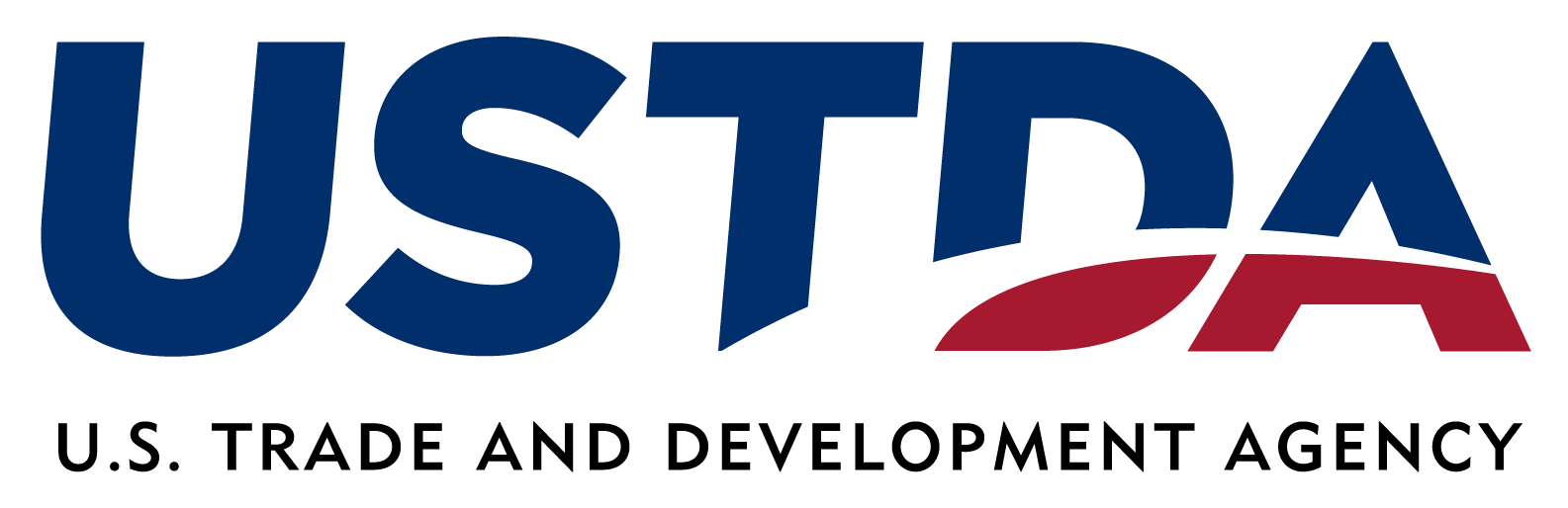

Agency overview
- Formed: 1992; 34 years ago
- Headquarters: 1101 Wilson Blvd., Arlington County, Virginia, U.S.
- Employees: 80
- Annual budget: $87 million (FY 2026)
- Website: www.ustda.gov

The United States Trade and Development Agency (USTDA) is an independent agency of the United States government, formed in 1992 to advance economic development and U.S. commercial interests in developing and middle income countries.

== History ==
USTDA's roots date to the 1970s, when the United States Agency for International Development (USAID) coordinated a government-wide "Reimbursable Development Program" (RDP) to provide foreign countries continued access to U.S. development advice, U.S. technical assistance, U.S. equipment, and U.S. technology "even after they have reached the stage where they no longer need to rely on concessional financing for their further development." Though well-intentioned, RDP became lost in USAID's mission and culture of international economic and humanitarian assistance. The Congressional Research Service described the problem as follows: "…AID's expenditures for [RDP program] activities linking U.S. business to development in 1976 and 1977 fell to only about $1 million annually. By the end of the 1970s, however, there was a growing sense in Congress that the U.S. private sector should be more active in development programs. In 1978, Congress directed AID to increase emphasis on U.S. private sector involvement in development assistance."

In 1980 and 1981, the United States Agency for International Development and the Overseas Private Investment Corporation (OPIC) were linked in the International Development Cooperation Agency (IDCA) – an "umbrella agency tasked with coordinating U.S. development assistance programs." RDP was carved out as a "separate part" of IDCA and re-named the Trade and Development Program (TDP) to "further underscore the link between private sector and U.S. development activities." Congress codified these actions in 1981.

In 1988, in the Omnibus Foreign Trade and Competitiveness Act, Congress again reaffirmed its support of the TDP and its dual missions by making the program a separate component agency within the IDCA, headed by a presidential appointee. The complete separation from USAID was underscored by transferring to TDP a tied aid credits program earlier administered by USAID that was meant to assist U.S. companies competing against subsidized foreign competition. Congress also made clear its intention that "The Trade and Development Program should serve as the primary Federal agency to provide information to persons in the private sector concerning trade and development and export promotion related to bilateral development projects."

=== USTDA as an independent agency ===
The 1992 Jobs Through Exports Act renamed TDP as the Trade and Development Agency and revised and expanded its mission, charter and authorities. In taking these actions, Congress described USTDA as "one of the most successful government export promotion programs," and increased USTDA's budget authorization, saying "by increasing the amount of funding available, [Congress] is not only demonstrating its support for the program, but acknowledging the increased need for its services." USTDA's independence and character were again reaffirmed when Congress said it "would expect that the increase in TDA's authorization will discourage attempts by other agencies and departments within the executive branch to duplicate the work of the TDA."

USTDA's charter has not changed much since its establishment in 1992, with the exception of a 1999 Congressional designation of energy, transportation, telecommunications and environment as "special emphasis…economic sectors with significant United States export potential".

== Structure ==
The U.S. Trade and Development Agency (USTDA) was created under the (22 U.S.C. §2421) to "promote United States private sector participation in development projects in developing and middle-income countries" and to "provide opportunities for the use of United States exports." With these Congressional mandates, USTDA's dual mission is unique among foreign assistance agencies: while the Agency promotes outcomes in infrastructure and economic development, it is mandated to help create American jobs through exports.

== Programs ==
The agency's legal basis is section 661 of the Foreign Assistance Act of 1961, as amended (22 USC 2421). USTDA's mission is to "promote economic growth in developing and middle income countries, while simultaneously helping American businesses to export their products and services, thereby creating U.S. jobs".

USTDA's programs are designed to help countries establish a favorable trading environment and a modern infrastructure that promotes sustainable economic development. According to USTDA, the agency's development assistance has always involved building partnerships between U.S. companies and overseas project sponsors to bring proven private-sector solutions to developmental challenges. As part of its programs, USTDA funds various forms of technical assistance, early investment analysis, training, orientation visits, and business workshops in the areas of trade capacity building and sector development, and project definition and investment analysis.

USTDA works closely with other federal agencies to advance host country development objectives, but unlike U.S. Agency for International Development (USAID), USTDA gives preference to projects that promote the export of U.S. goods and services. Most USTDA projects are located in Africa, Latin America, and Asia. The agency's activities span a wide variety of sectors, although projects in the transportation and energy and power sectors account for 43% of the funding in 2008. In 2008, USTDA obligated over a total of $46 million in support of projects in 66 host counties around the world, including 67 technical assistance activities, 41 feasibility studies, and 24 orientation visits.

In 2010, President Barack Obama signed an executive order, the National Export Initiative, in an attempt to double the amount of US exports through 2015. To support this project, the USTDA launched the International Business Partnership Program, a program that helped connect American manufacturers with international trade partners around the world.
