= Charles Dunbar (Royal Navy officer) =

Paymaster Rear-Admiral Charles Augustus Royer Flood Dunbar CBE (30 June 1849 – 7 May 1939) was a Royal Navy officer. He saw service during the Boxer Rebellion and the First World War.
