= Susan L. Ziadeh =

American diplomat

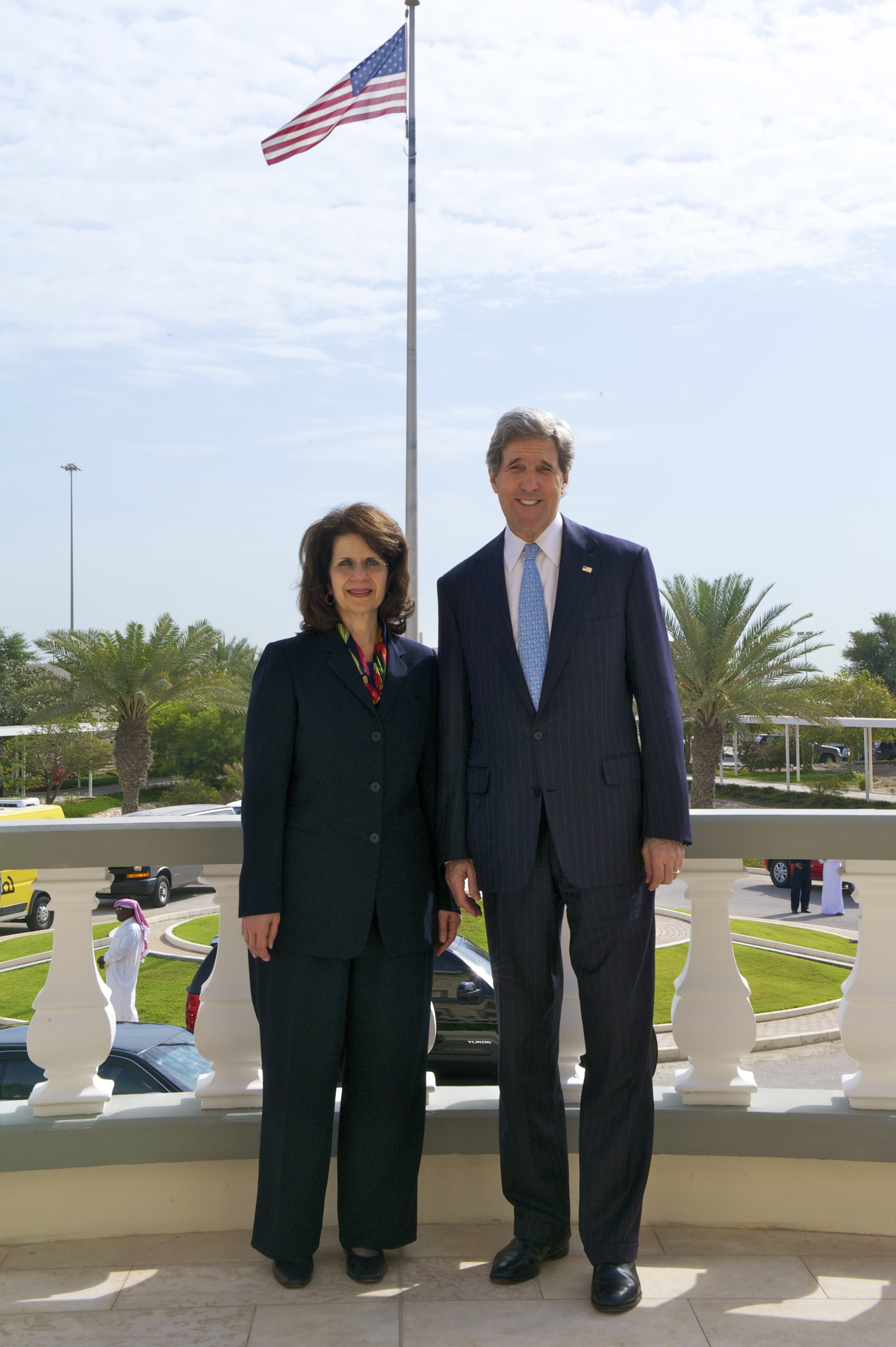
Ziadeh with then-U.S. secretary of state John Kerry at the U.S. Embassy in Doha, Qatar, March 2013

Susan L. Ziadeh (born 1951) is a member of the Middle East Institute’s board of governors who served as the U.S. ambassador to Qatar from 2011 to 2014. Her rank was as a career member of the Senior Foreign Service, class of minister-counselor.

== Education ==
Ziadeh earned a PhD in history from the University of Michigan, an M.A. from the American University of Beirut, and a B.A. from the University of Washington. In 2004, she graduated with distinction from the National War College, National Defense University with an M.S. in national security strategy. Ziadeh was a Fulbright scholar in Egypt and Lebanon.

== Career ==
Before retiring after 23 years in the Foreign Service, Ziadeh served as the deputy assistant secretary of state for Arabian Peninsula affairs in the Bureau of Near Eastern Affairs. Other posts included deputy chief of mission at the U.S. Embassy in Riyadh, official spokesperson at the U.S. Embassy in Baghdad, and deputy chief of mission at the U.S. Embassy in Bahrain. She is also a is a non-resident fellow at the Arab Gulf States Institute in Washington and an adjunct professor at Georgetown University’s Walsh School of Foreign Service’s Center for Contemporary Arab Studies (CCAS).
