= Charles Franklin Dunbar (diplomat) =

American diplomat (born 1937)

Charles Franklin Dunbar (born April 1, 1937) is an American former diplomat who was a career Foreign Service Officer. He served in a number of capacities, including Chargé d'Affaires ad interim (Afghanistan) (January 1982 – May 1983), Ambassador Extraordinary and Plenipotentiary to Qatar (October 7, 1983 – March 23, 1985), and Ambassador Extraordinary and Plenipotentiary to Yemen (June 16, 1988 – June 13, 1991).

== Early life and education ==
Dunbar was born in Cambridge, Massachusetts, on April 1, 1937.

- A.B., history Harvard College, 1959
- M.I.A. from the School of International Affairs, Columbia University, 1961
- A year of State Department-sponsored graduate study at the Woodrow Wilson School of Public and International Affairs, Princeton University, 1980–81

== Career ==
From 1962 to 1981, he was assigned to the American Embassies in Tehran, Kabul, Rabat, Algiers and Nouakchott, Mauritania as well as the American Consulate in Isfahan, Iran. Dunbar held several other posts until 1998 when he served as the UN Secretary-General's Special Representative for Western Sahara.

Dunbar went on to serve as President of the nonprofit Cleveland Council on World Affairs from 1993 to 2000. He was an adjunct professor of political science at Case Western Reserve University, Warburg Professor in International Relations at Simmons College (2001–2004) and professor (later lecturer) in International Relations at Boston University 2004–2012).

== Publications ==
- The Unification of Yemen: Process, Politics, and Prospects Middle East Journal Vol. 46, No. 3 (Summer, 1992), pp. 456–476
