= Haus zur goldenen Waage =

Timber-framed house

Coordinates: 50°06′38″N 8°41′04″E

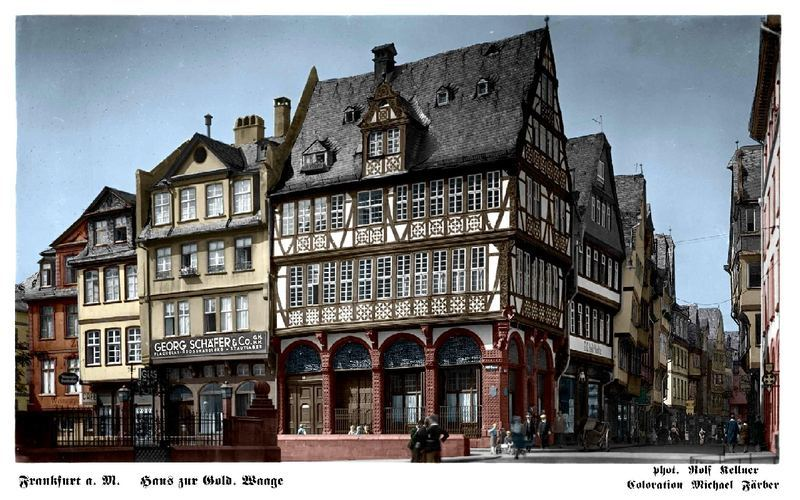
Goldene Waage (front building in the middle) on coloured photochrom print around 1900

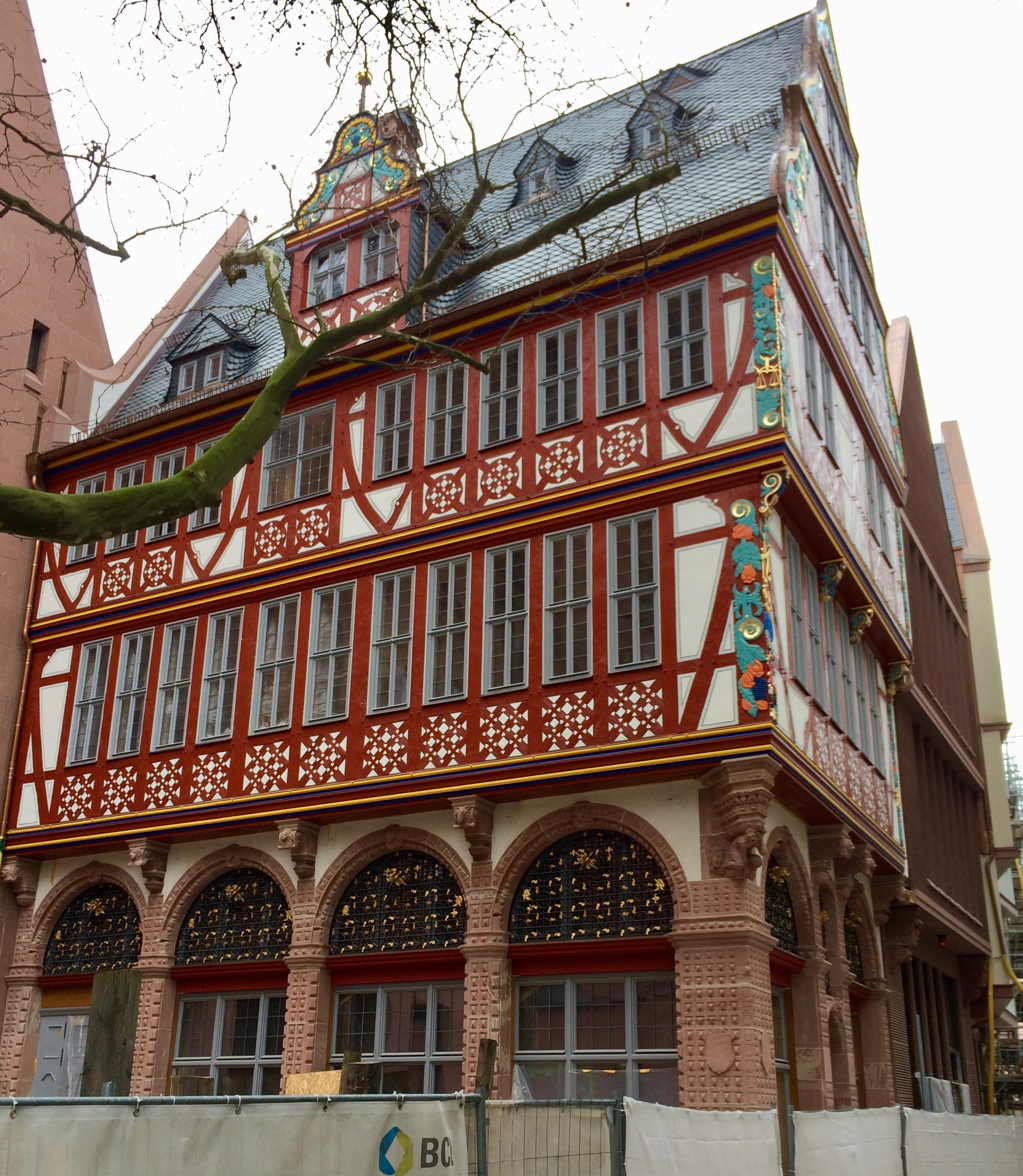
Reconstruction of the Goldenen Waage in January 2018

The Haus zur Goldenen Waage is a medieval half-timbered house in the old town of Frankfurt am Main, which was destroyed in the air raid on 22 March 1944. Because of its high architectural and historic value, it is one of the most famous sights of the city. It is situated in front of the main entrance of the cathedral on the corner of the narrow Höllgasse, which leads from the cathedral square to the Römerberg and Altstadtgasse.

The detailed Renaissance facade dates from 1619. The remains of the house, which would have allowed reconstruction after the war, were eliminated in 1950. However, the archways remained preserved as part of a private library in Götzenhain. For more than 20 years the land was fallow. Then in 1972–73, during the construction of the subway station Dom / Römer, the Archaeological Garden was created, allowing access to excavations of the Roman settlement on Cathedral hill and the Carolingian Royal Palace Frankfurt.

In 2007, reconstruction of parts of the former old town became part of the Dom-Römer Project, which included the rebuilding of the Goldenen Waage. Work did not start until 2014. During the reconstruction, the Archaeological Garden was covered over but remains accessible via the neighbouring townhouse on the market square.

In December 2017, the half-timbered facade, the Renaissance ceiling and the belvedere were completed. There are plans to open the restored building to the public in 2019, along with a café and a local office of the Historical Museum.

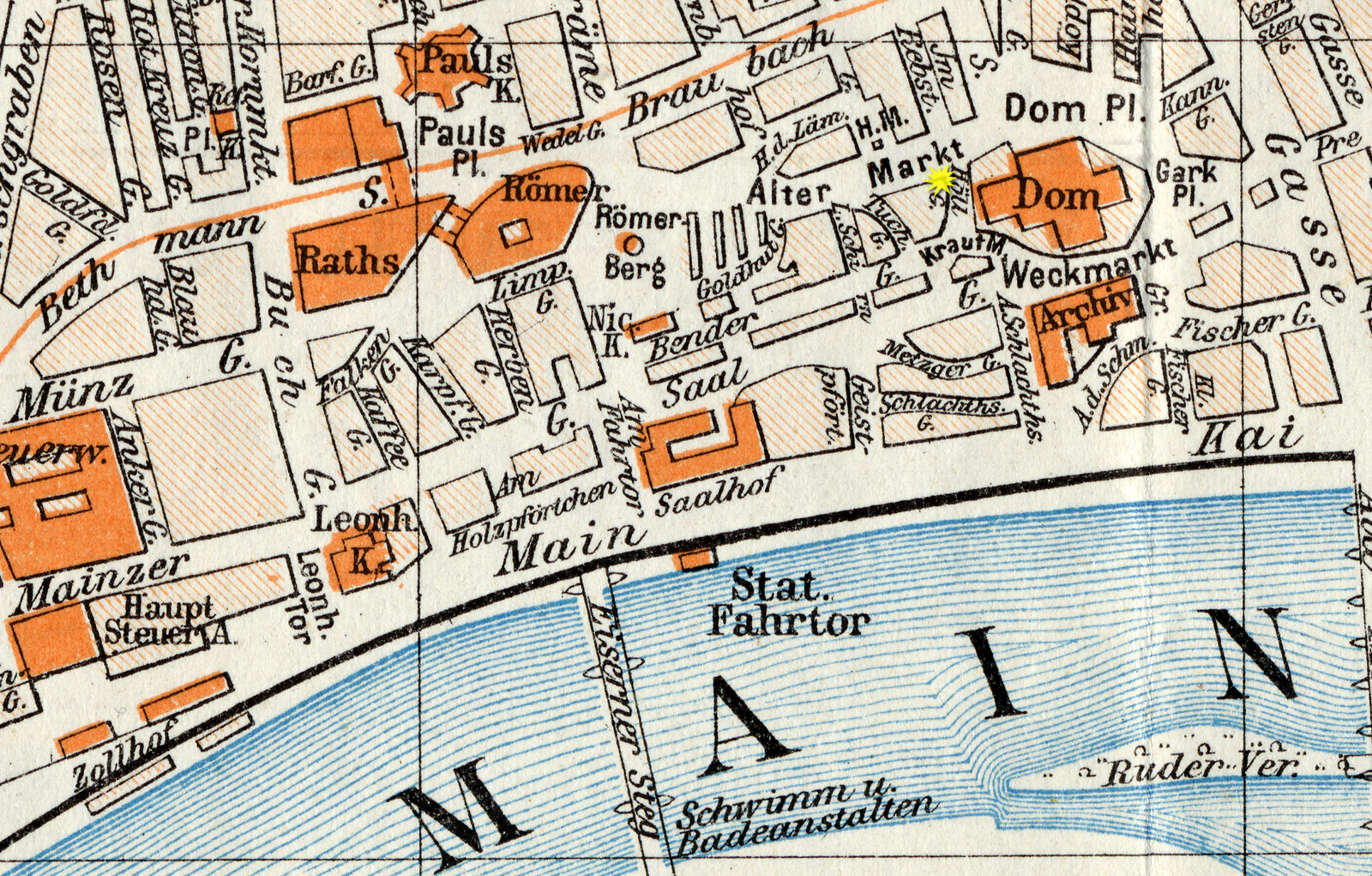
Location of the building in Frankfurt's old town

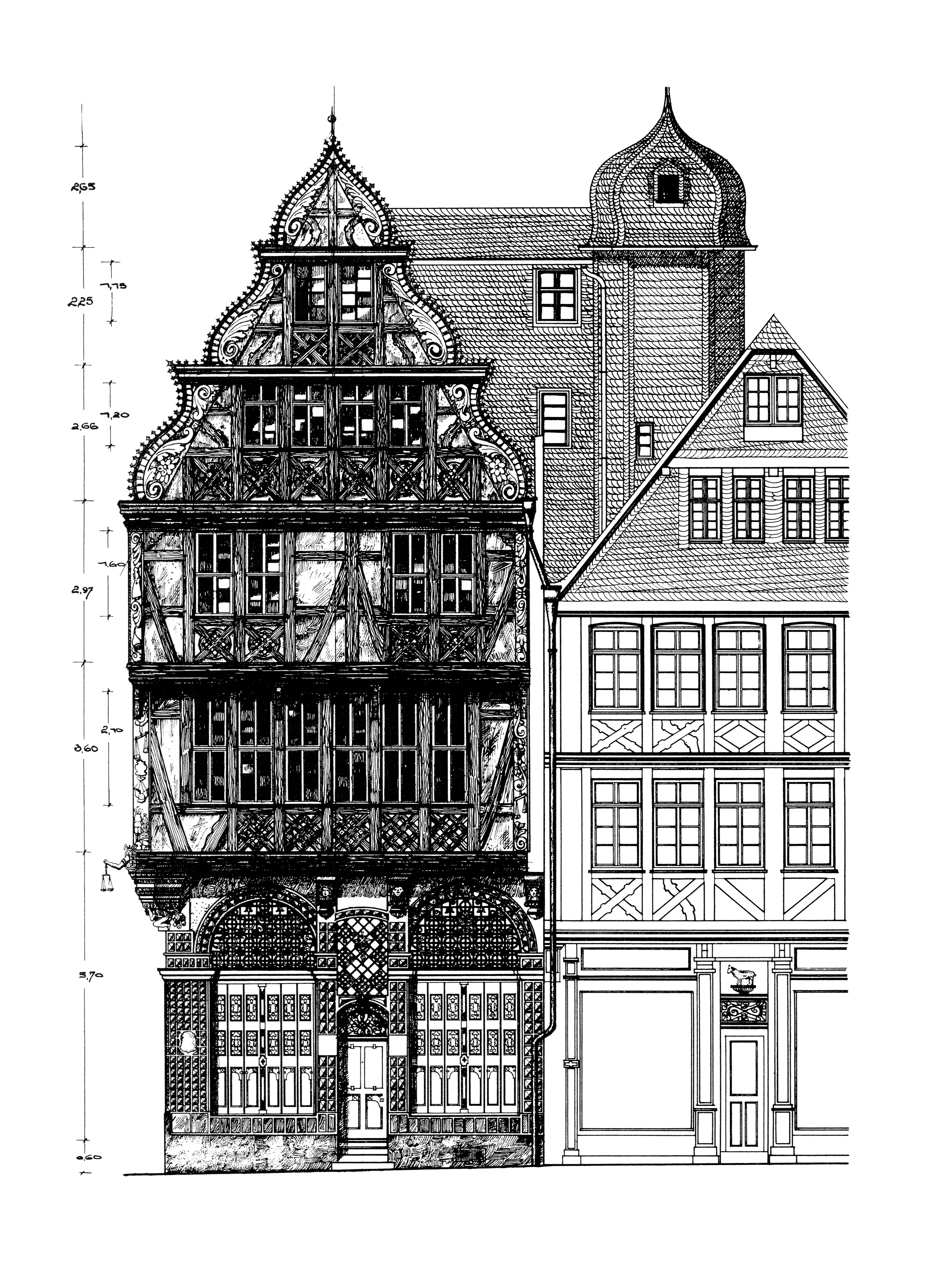
Measurement of the facade on the market square, around 1910

== History ==
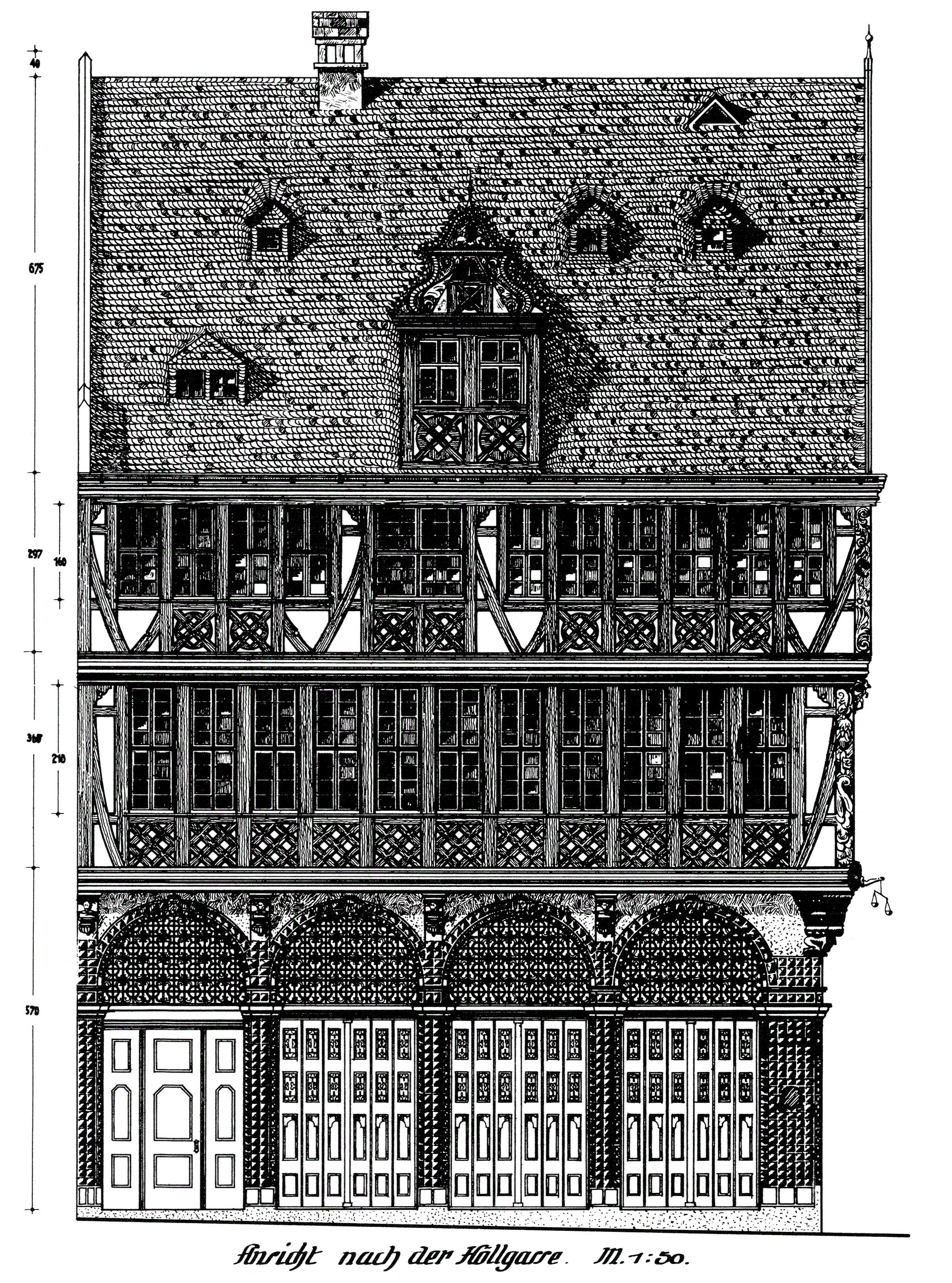
Measurement of the facade on Höllgasse, around 1910

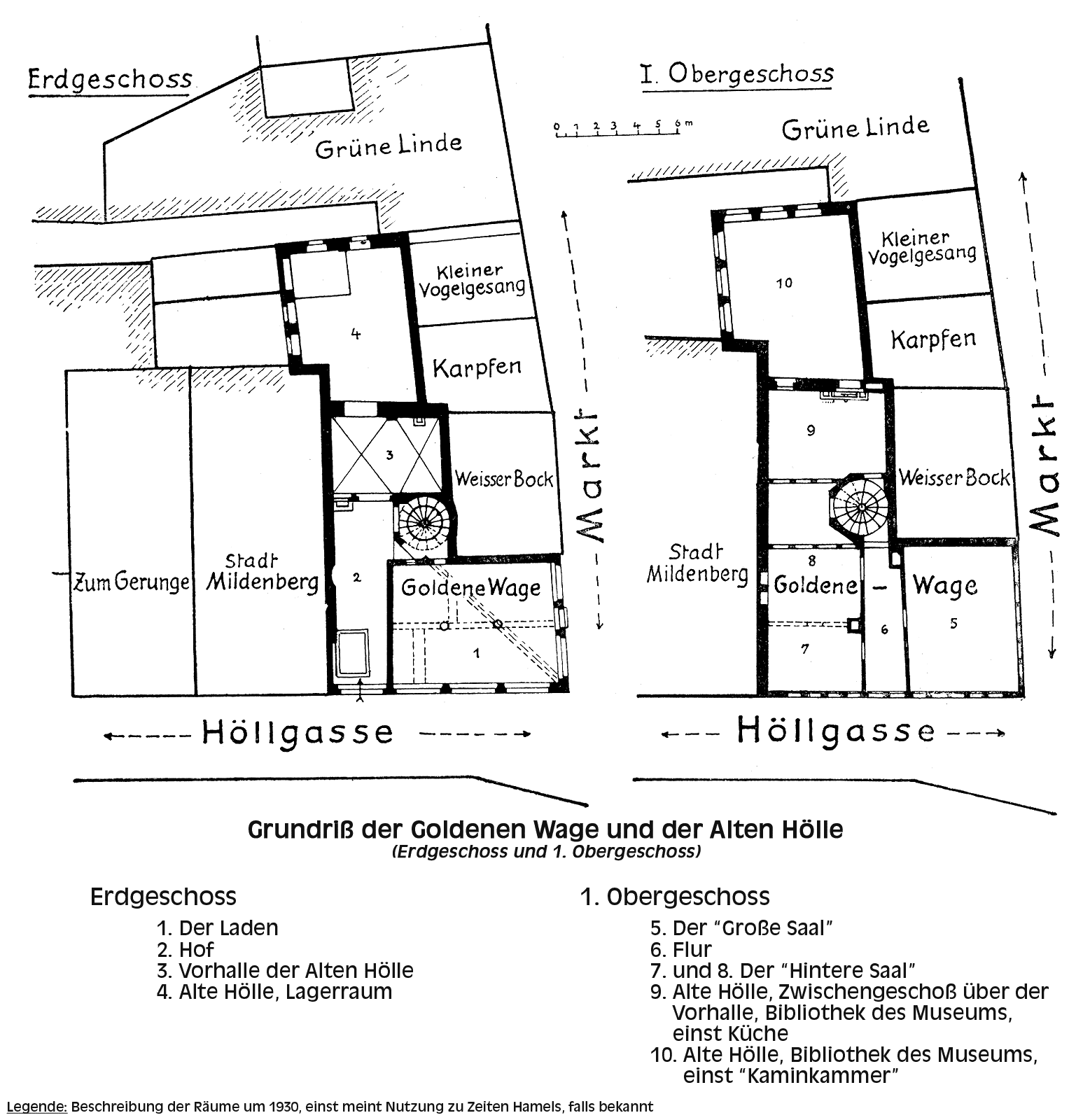
Floor plan of ground floor and first floor

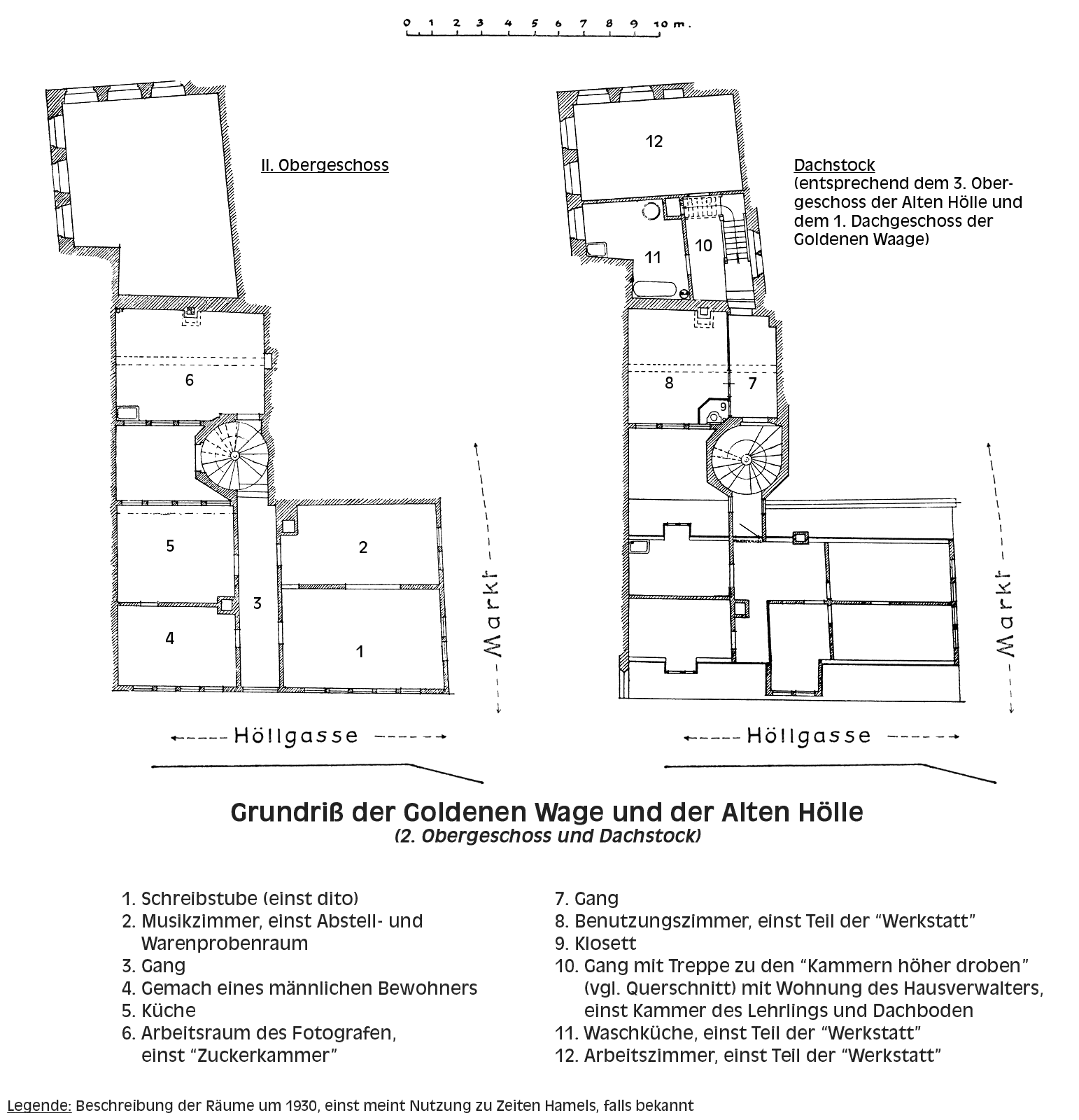
Floor plan of 2nd floor and attic

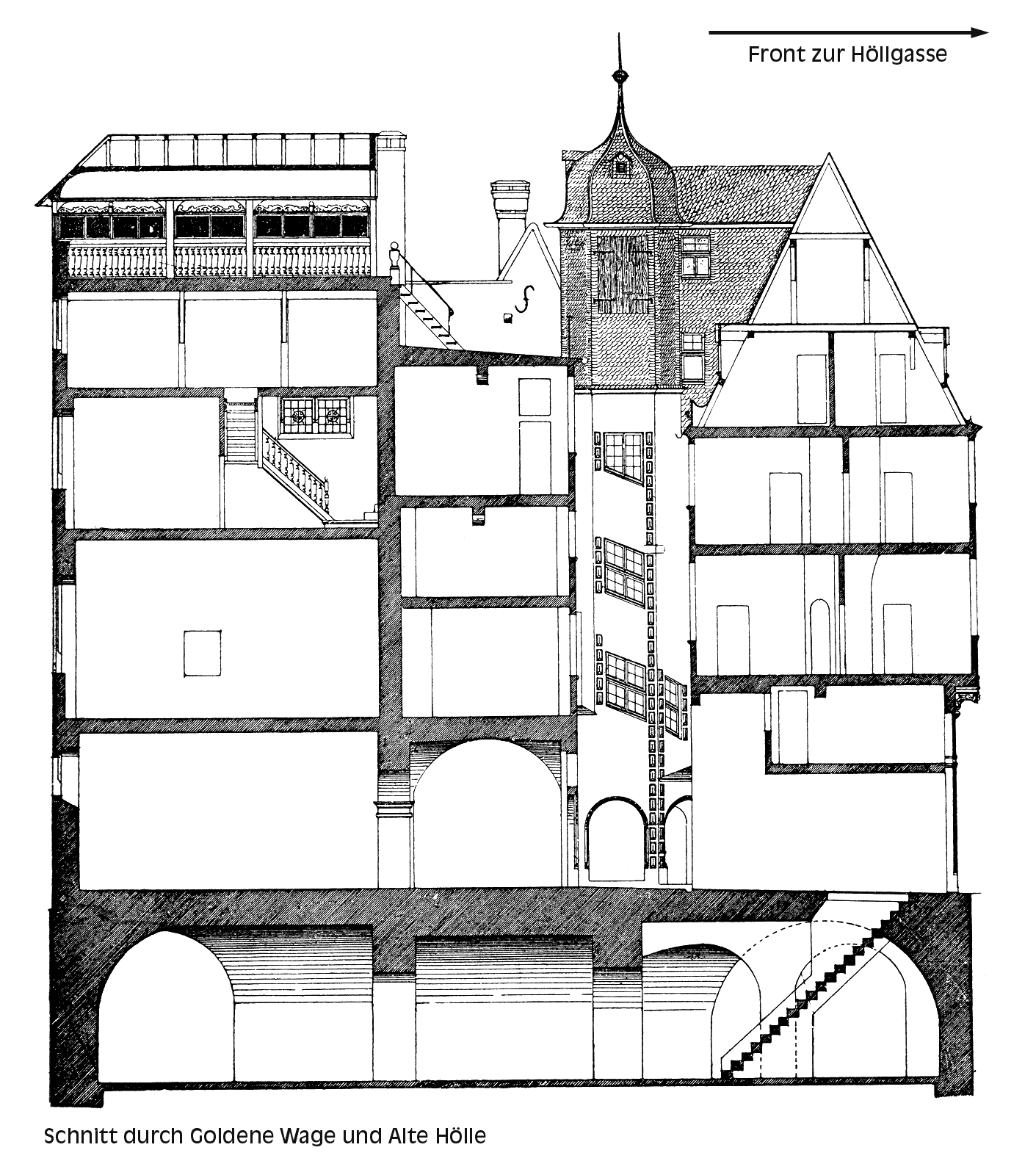
Cross-section

=== Prehistory ===
The house on the corner of Höllgasse was mentioned as early as the Middle Ages, in 1323, known as House Kulmann or Colmann after the owner. In 1405, it became one building with the house behind it, the Alte Hölle (Old Hell). Around this time the name Höllgasse (Hell's Lane) emerged, which described the densely built and extremely dark lane between the market square and Bendergasse, which was very narrow even for medieval times. There was also a house called Junge Hölle (Young Hell), located on the eastern side of Höllgasse, directly opposite Alte Hölle (Old Hell). Most of the houses on this side of the street were built with overhangs, which meant the first floor was on the property of the cathedral – much to the annoyance of the cathedral administration. The first legal case was recorded in 1299, when the goldsmith Colmann came into conflict with the clergy because his house was located on the eastern side of Höllgasse.

=== The Goldene Waage under Abraham van Hamel ===
The corner house Goldene Waage, as well as the Alte Hölle was bought by Andreas Gaßmann for 3,040 and 2,000 Guilders respectively in 1588. The confectioner and spice trader Abraham van Hamel bought the buildings from Maria Margarethe Gaßmann in 1605. Hamel came from Tournai in the Spanish Netherlands. As a member of the Continental Reformed Church and a religious refugee he travelled through Sittard near Aachen and Wesel in 1599 and arrived in Frankfurt, where his father and brother had already taken up citizenship. Despite some opposition from the guilds he was permitted to take the citizen's oath on 19 November 1599.

From 1618 to 1619, he ordered the four-storeyed front-facing house on his property to be torn down and replaced it with an elaborately designed new house. His project came in for intense resistance from the council and begrudging neighbors. The public display of prosperity was frowned upon in Frankfurt, which the owner of the similarly elaborately ornamented Salzhaus had experienced. Hamel was a provocative man who reached his goals most of the time, sometimes even by ruthless means – either by using his assets or by filing a lawsuit. However, his readiness to take legal action quickly caused him to be considered an outcast by the citizens of Frankfurt, who soon claimed that "he had to quarrel with everyone, which would justify a special council of Schepen to deal with his actions."

The dispute concerning the construction of the Goldene Waage was documented in the city archives.

In February 1618 Hamel first asked for permission to tear down his run-down house to replace it with a new four-storeyed building consisting of a ground floor and three upper floors. Even though Hamel promised to abide by the laws and regulations, including to not build above the neighbor's property, thereby not "allowing navigation caused by narrowing of alleyways and other nuisances and drawbacks". The construction of the house, according to Hamel, would have led to "quite some wealth, adornment and a good reputation" and was not permitted. The neighbors, who were all well established families of merchants and patricians from Frankfurt, objected the tall construction which, according to them, would have restricted the narrow alleyway's exposure to light and air and increased the danger of fire. They grudged the foreigner the construction. A written document states: "because of justice and appropriateness, a Dutchman, who is predestined to seek his own advantages, should not be favoured over other long-standing and local citizens."

Hamel countered that for his business the acquisition of more space was very important due to the expensive property at the market forcing him to build up to the same height to use the house to its full extent. During this time the market constituted the main shopping street, comparable to the current Zeil street in Frankfurt. Hamel lost the trial and therefore the Goldene Waage only became a three-story building, contrary to the original planing.

At the beginning of July 1618, a neighbour filed another complaint against the construction when the ground floor and the timber-framework had already been completed. An inspection by the Schöffen (judiciary executives) came to the conclusion that the ground floor was one Schuh ( literally shoe – about 28,5 cm) too high compared to the blueprints provided by Hamel. Due to this the planning permission was almost denied, but although as so often before Hamel used his wealth to get his way. He paid a fine of 100 Reichstalern for another infringement of the blueprints consisting of a speed-up of the construction to finish the house in time for the autumn fair in 1618 and was "left to it".

Nevertheless, the house was not finished by the autumn fair in 1618 because the locksmith Jacob Reynold, who created the latticework between the vaulted passages and the skylights of the ground floor, delivered so late that the house was not ready for over a year and could finally only be finished in 1619. This cost Hamel a lot of money because he had to rent several houses for his family and goods in the meantime. When the latticework was finished he sued the blacksmith because the latticework was not the same as that of the counsellor Johann Martin Hecker, as Hamel desired. Instead, according to Hamel, Reynold had "overloaded the grid with many excessive rings – which were not originally intended – in such a way that noticeable demage [sic?] would inevitably be caused through the lack of light" and furthermore "the rods so thickness should be more than enough to lock up a prisoner". He refused an evaluation of the situation by the jury of craftsmen from the outset because he believed them to be prejudiced. Thus, the locksmith received no judgement and Hamel filed another lawsuit before the local court (Schöffengericht). This time he won by submitting a declaration signed by all other workers participating in the construction, according to which he had "with benevolence and good will, paid and pleased them without any argument or misunderstanding".

Even though Hamel was a confectioner, he mostly traded with spices and dyes, which is documented by a petition by the city council which elevated him to a "trader" in 1619. Due to his extensive trade relations to the whole middle Rhine area, parts of northern Germany, but also in his homeland, he soon earned a fortune, which greatly exceeded the usual wealth of rich merchants in Frankfurt. At the time of his death on 19 January 1623 he already owned the complete western part of Hell's Lane and the bordering house of Wolkenburg (Krautmarkt 7) which was situated at the Krautmarkt (herb market).

=== From the era of Hamel to the purchase of the city ===
It was now the turn of Hamels widow and one of his younger brothers to keep on networking. This was nearly impossible due to the beginning of the Thirty Years' War. From 1631 to 1635 Frankfurt was partly occupied by Swedish soldiers. The complaints of the war reached the city, that was filled with refugees, too: From 1634 to 1636 almost 14,000 people died during the years of the Plague. During peaceful times Frankfurt had around 15,000 inhabitants, of whom many were refugees. The first three years of the pest (1634–1636) took 14,000 peoples' lives in Frankfurt. Wide parts of the population were experiencing extreme poverty and famine due to the highest inflation in history. When Widow Hamel died on 25 July 1655, her outstanding debts were as high as 60,000 Gulden and her real estate properties were highly indebted too. As a consequence of these high debts, her heirs sold the Haus zur Goldenen Waage and the Alte Hölle for 8,500 Gulden to a tradesman from Frankfurt called Wilhelm Sonnemann. The owners changed many times over the next few centuries: 1655–1699 it belonged to the Barckhausen family, 1699–1748 to the Grimmeisen merchants and from 1748–1862 to Von der Lahr family. Before it was bought in 1898 by the city of Frankfurt for 98,000 Mark, it was owned by the families Osterrieth and Scheld'

=== The Goldene Waage in the 20th century ===
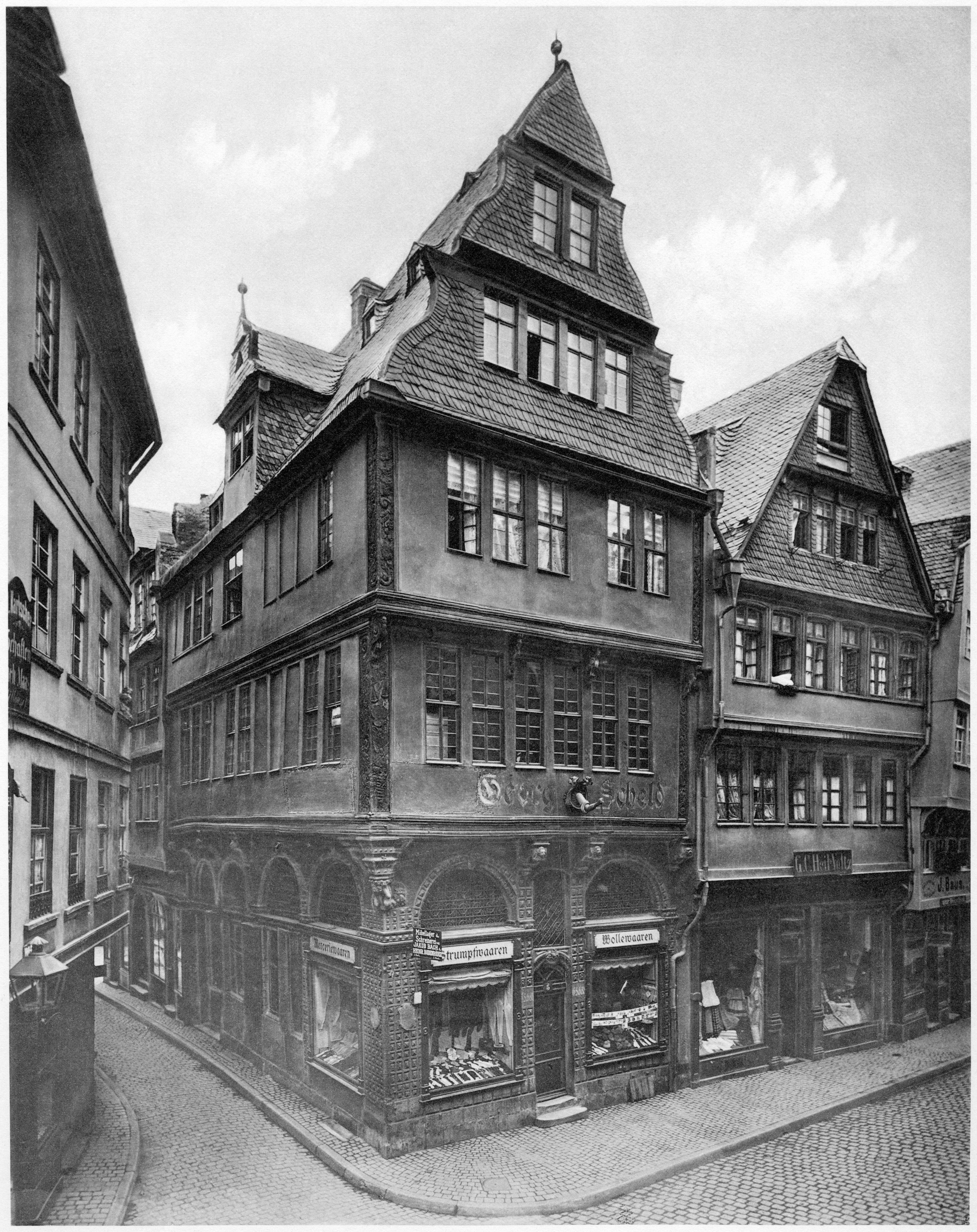
Before the restoration 1899

The building was completely renovated starting in 1899 by the builder Franz von Hoven. In the 19th century, the plaster and the slates were removed to make the old timber framing visible. Dividing walls that had been added later inside were demolished. A few years later, the buildings to the east of the narrow Höllgasse were knocked down to make the Domplatz bigger, so the Haus zur Goldenen Waage could now be seen more easily. In 1913 the city of Frankfurt gifted the historical museum with the building. In 1928 the Historical Museum furnished the house in the style of a typical townhouse in Frankfurt around the 18th century. The 18th century was chosen because the latest major extensions were made during this time. Also, the inventory was still original since the death of Hamel. It was common for the court to note down the furniture of every wealthy citizen after their death. After her death in 1635, the inventory of Hamel's wife was officially recorded. At the time, the inventory was officially recorded, the inheritance had already been split (as was the custom). Hence, it reflects almost exactly the furnishings of the house when Hamel died. This made it possible for the museum to equip the rooms original. The first airstrikes that hit Frankfurt up to 1942 did not do much damage however the Union of Old Town Frankfurt decided to keep a written record with photos of the whole existing building stock from summer 1942 onwards. With the beginning of the Combined Bomber Offensive in 1943 Frankfurt became a target for airstrikes. The Haus zur Goldenen Waage remained undamaged at first, even though the attacks of 4 October 1943, 29 January 1944, and 18 March 1944, damaged big parts of the surrounding area. All parts of the old town between Frankfurt Cathedral and Römer including the Haus zur Goldenen Waage were destroyed during the airstrike on 22 March 1944. The house collapsed to its sandstone pedestal because the beautiful timber frame was burning. The loss of many works of art, that were integrated into the building and historically and materially irreplaceable e.g. the complex ceilings of the different rooms or the tile stove on the first floor was exceptionally tragic. Major artworks exhibited by the museum survived the war without any damage because they were brought to other places before the attacks. A simplified reconstruction of the building (similar to the reconstruction of the Salzhaus) would have been possible because of the existing inventory and the intact foundation walls but the city removed the ruins completely in 1950. The arcades of the Goldene Waage were sold to a private investor from Götzenhain, who built himself a private library for his villa. The reconstruction of the old town went on from 1952 to 1960. Modern functional and residential buildings with new floorplans and traffic routes were produced. The area between Frankfurt Cathedral and Römer was left out and stayed a waste land until the 1970s. Excavations in the 1950s found a lot of evidence of Roman, Merovingian, Karolingian and late medieval buildings in the area.

== Reconstruction ==
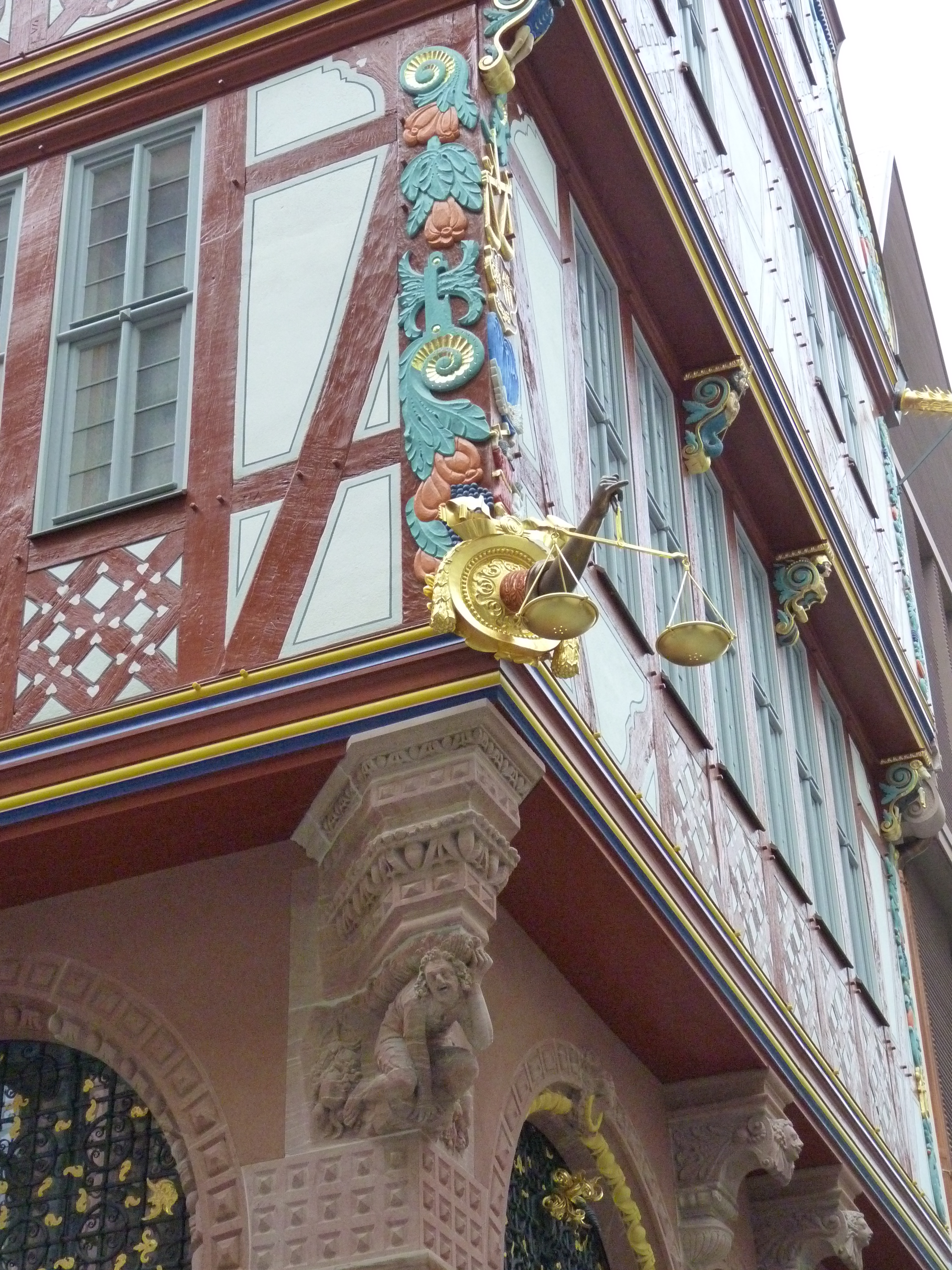
Since May 2018, the Goldene Waage has had its place again

At the beginning of the 21st century, the city started planning the future design of the old town area by the cathedral, later known as the Dom-Römer Project. In 2005 – more than 60 years after the destruction of the old town – both the inhabitants and the city council had a preference for the most exact possible restoration of the historical site with alleys, squares and courtyards, as well as the reconstruction of individual houses significant for town-planning. In a newspaper interview, Mayor Petra Roth suggested the reconstruction of four historically significant buildings, including the Goldene Waage.

In order to evaluate the technical possibilities of the reconstruction, the city set up a project to document the old town in 2006. The study found that none of the buildings could be historically reconstructed, not even the particularly well-documented Goldene Waage. A creative reconstruction, "in which the street facade and the basic layout, in particular, could be rebuilt and possibly extended," seemed possible. The historical city plan could only be partially reconstructed; in particular, because the house by the cathedral, the Goldene Waage, could no longer be rebuilt on its original site. In order to keep the excavations of the archaeological garden accessible, a superstructure was to be built, in which larger struts had to be incorporated. Further research was necessary to establish, for example, whether the historical level of the streets and ground floors could be maintained. The current building regulations had to be observed for each reconstruction, especially with regard to fire protection, energy efficiency and the possibility of safe escape routes. Stairwells had to be fire-proof and made of non-flammable materials.

On 6 September 2007, the city council decided to rebuild the Dom-Römer area. The CDU, Bündnis 90/Die Grünen, FDP and Freien Wählern (free voters) voted for this, the SPD and Die Linke against. The reconstruction of at least seven buildings, including the Goldene Waage was included in this decision.

The Jourdan & Müller office was offered the contract to reconstruct the Goldene Waage. The new Goldene Waage now connects to the townhouse to the south, and the Haus Weißer Bock to the west (Market 7), both of which are contemporary designs.

Construction began in 2014. A specialist company in Lemgo was hired for the reconstruction of the half-timbered facade, for which around 100 cubic meters of old oak from historic buildings was reused. More than a dozen spolia were found in the rubble and reused.

In December 2017, the facade of the new building (der äußerlich fertiggestellte Neubau) was completed, including the restored half-timbered facade, the Renaissance ceiling and the Belvedere, and presented at a press conference. In September 2018, the New Frankfurt Old Town was inaugurated with a two-day festival, although the interior of the Goldene Waage was not yet completed. The café on the ground floor opened in September 2019. The Historical Museum is still to be set up on the two upper floors.

== Architecture ==
=== Outside ===
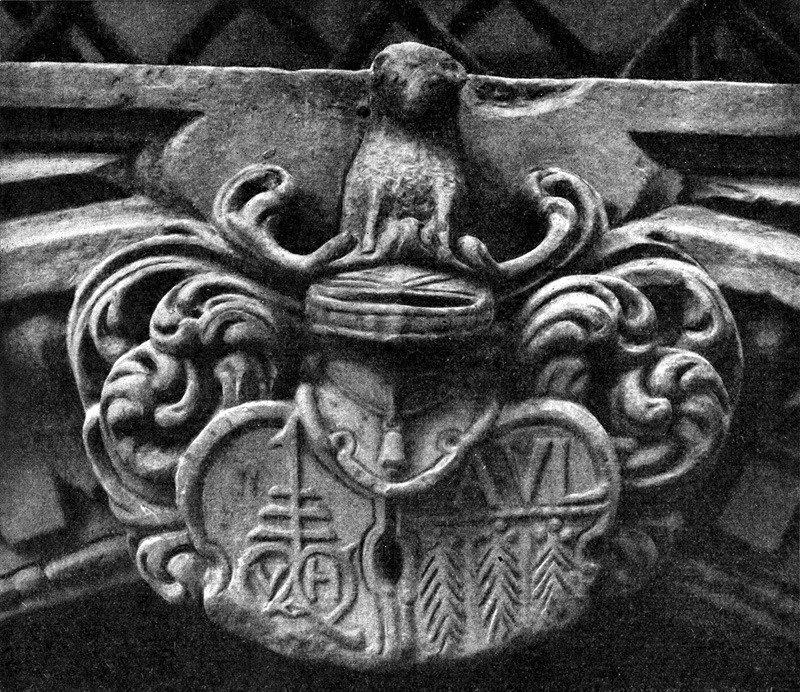
Arms of alliance above the door leading to the market

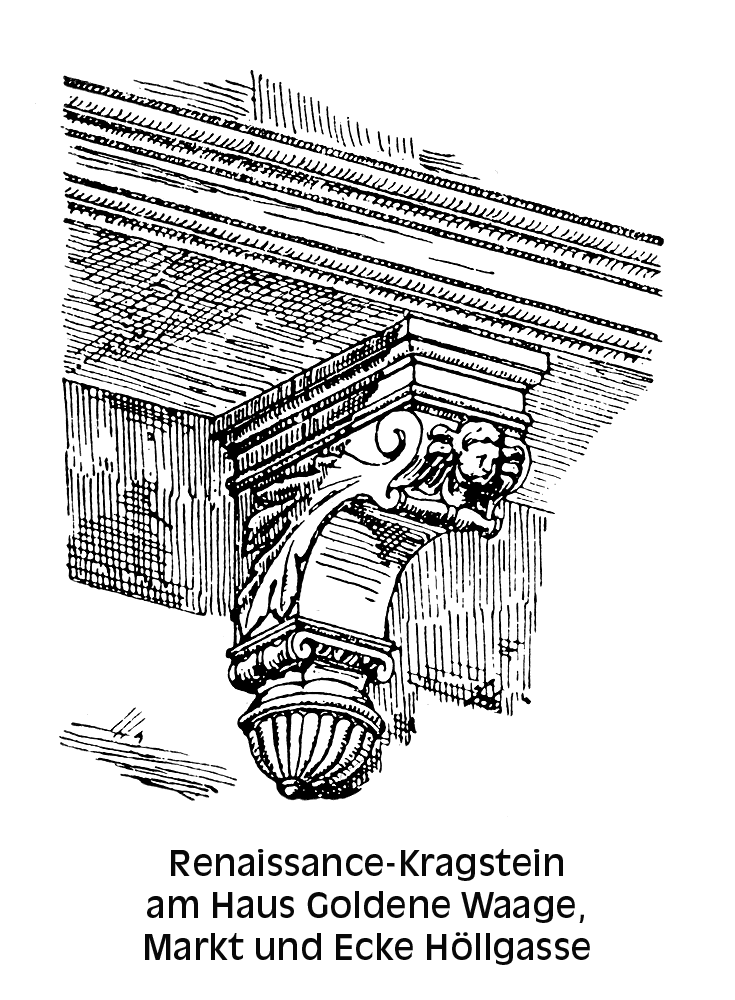
Corbel

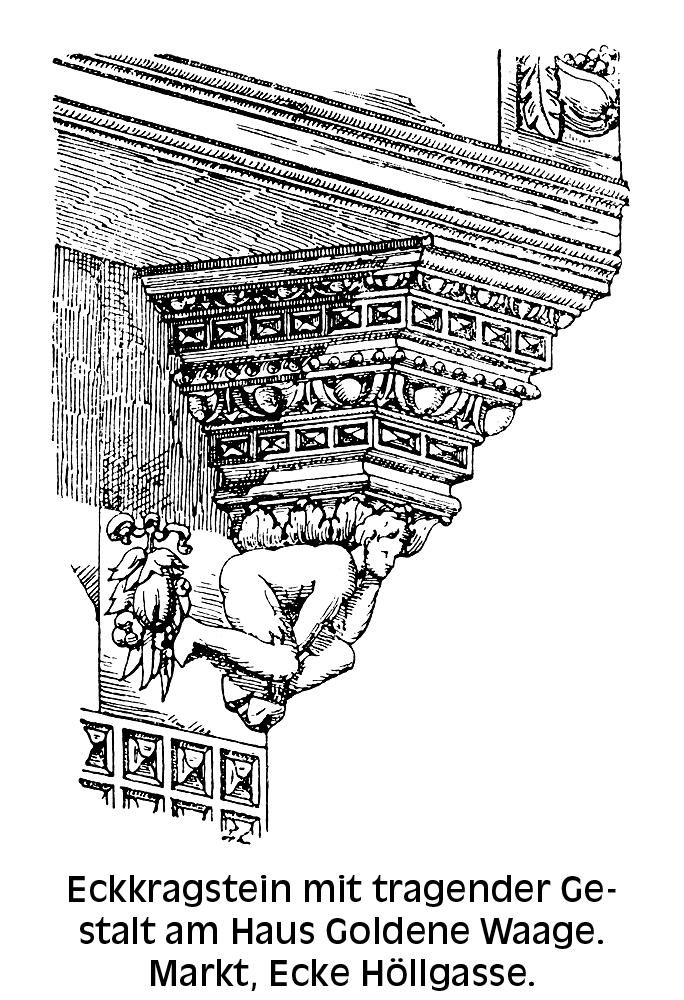
Corbel at the edge of the house

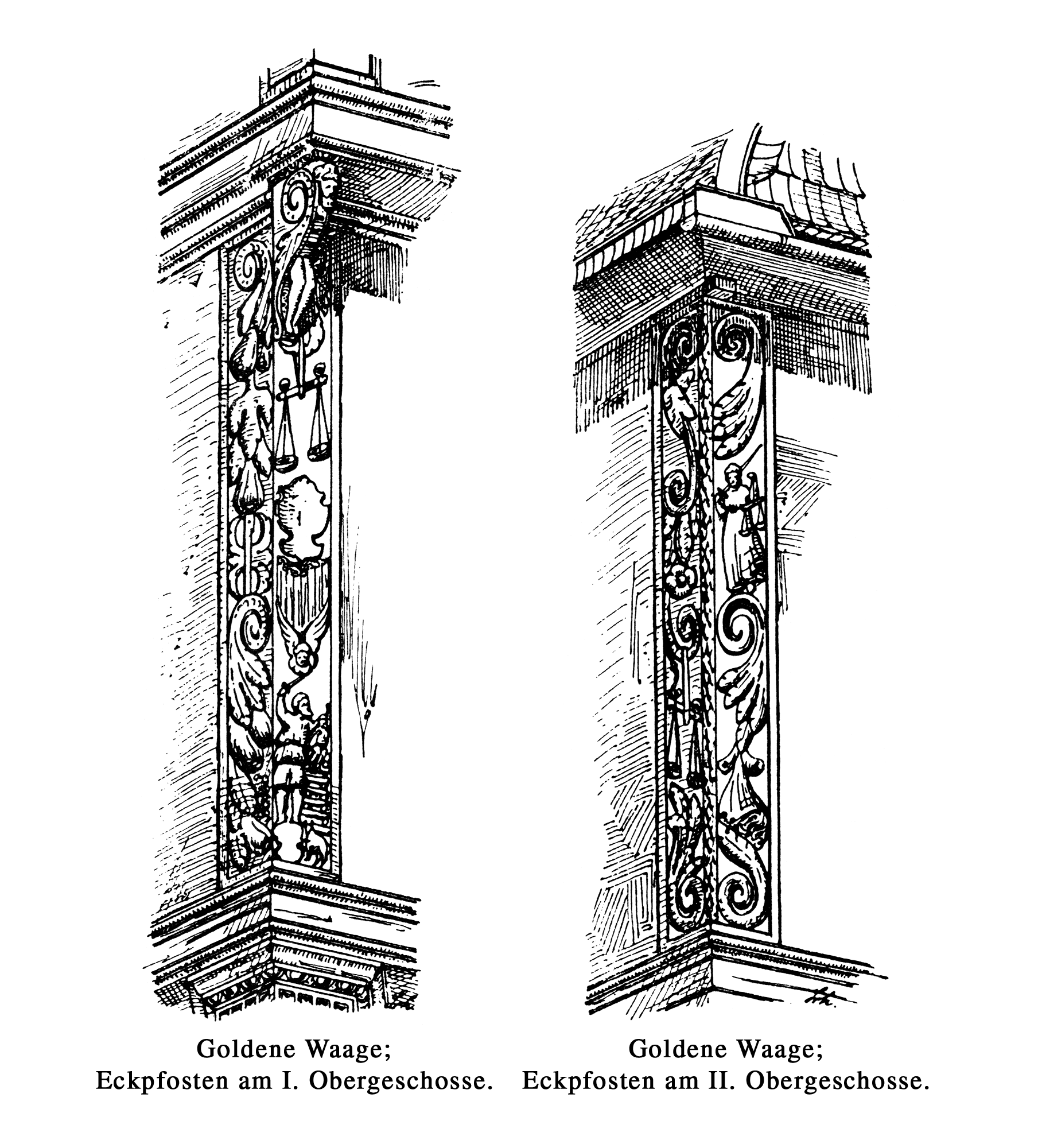
Carvings at corner posts

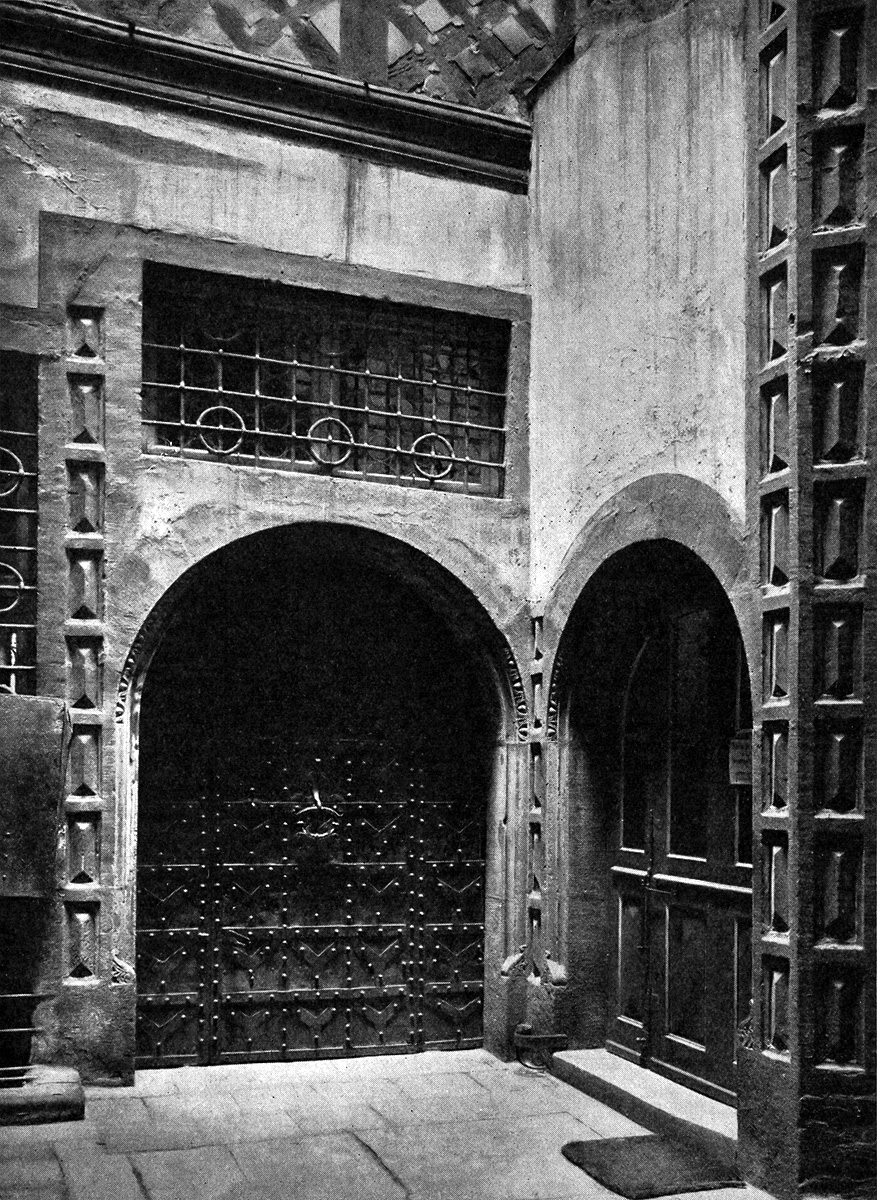
Yard on the ground floor

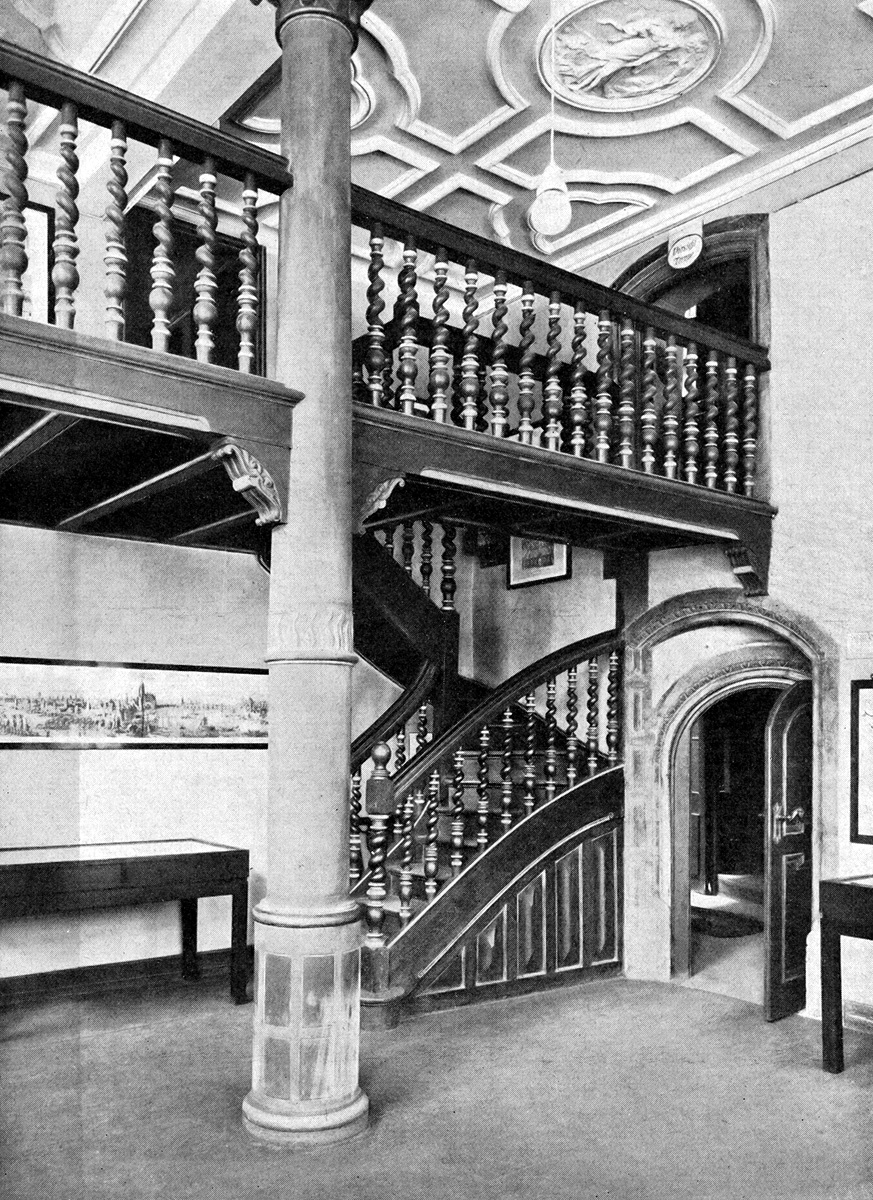
Shop and Bobbelage on the ground floor

Judging by its outward appearance, the Goldene Waage appeared to be a typical renaissance building in Frankfurt's historic city center: a tall foundation made of red sandstone that outwardly showed intricate, richly decorated arcades – four of which pointed towards Hell's Lane (Höllgasse), two towards the market. The arcades were based on widely overhanging imposts; the keystones depicted lions' heads. The front door, which was decorated by a double lintel, was located between the two arcades facing the market. While the upper one was connected to the (extended) column shafts of the arcades, the lower formed almost a straight line. Its keystone displayed the coat-of-arms of Abraham van Hamel and his wife Anna van Lith (as can be seen in the photograph). The arms of alliance coat-of-arms consisted of two men's shields directly next to each other. The right-hand shield displayed a vertical arrow with a barbed hook and three horizontal lines over the shaft. The arrow ended between two ovals, which formed the letter A(braham) with their curves and one linking line. The letters V(on) and H(amel) could be seen in the ovals themselves. The left shield displayed three stoat's tails in the lower two-thirds and the letters A(nna) V(an) L(ith) in the upper area. The helmet crest was a guardian ram (German: Hammel), undoubtedly a reference to the name of the builder.

Taking early seventeenth century conditions into account, the construction was a masterpiece of structural engineering of both the material and the construction: the open-worked arcades on the ground floor were not suitable as load-bearing elements. However, this was intentional, as it provided plenty of room on the ground floor to display the goods on sale. Thus, the Goldene Waage was essentially a house built upon pillars, but only the reinforced pillar at the north-eastern edge could be seen from outside. The remaining seven pillars on the ground floor provided structural analysis of the building and were located between the arcades. However, the pillars were so well incorporated into the arcades they seemed rather to be decorative elements. The corbels, which were located below the impost block of the shaft, had been carefully designed by the stonemason: on the biggest corbel at the north-western corner a crouching man surrounded by flowers was depicted (as can be seen in the image), the remaining seven corbels alternated between the depiction of a man's and a woman's head (as can be seen in the image). Only the stone on the outermost (most western from the top) side facing the market was particularly special in its own right, depicting a ram's head – whether this could be seen as a reference to the name Hamel (similar to Hammel, German for ram), has never been resolved. The name of the stonemason also remains unknown.

However, the name of the leading bricklayer during the construction is well-known (Wolf Burckhardt), as well as the name of the man who was responsible for the wrought iron grid between the circular arches and the skylights – locksmith Jacob Reynold. He was responsible for the wrought iron latticework between the circular arches and the skylights.

Above the kontor rooms there was a low intermediate storey on the level of the ground floor called the Bobbelage. The intermediate storey was used as a storage room for the kontor below, which was used as a salesroom. It was lit through the skylights in the arcade windows.

Above the ground floor there were two cantilevering half-timber framed floors, their gable side facing the market with two gable floors above. However, in comparison to the first floor the second floor protruded only on the side facing the market. The eastern side, facing the cathedral, displayed a very delicate design of the timber framing, which formed a pattern of saltires. The timber framing could be compared to the design at Schwarzer Stern, which had been built at Römerberg shortly before. In contrast to the Goldene Waage the Schwarzer Stern was rebuilt in the 1980s after its destruction in World War II. The timber frame of the upper floors also showed almost continuous rows of narrow windows on all sides. On the first floor there were eleven windows to the eastern side, six to the northern. On the second floor there were twelve windows to the eastern and four to the northern side. The glazing was completed around 1750.

The crossing pier, which was statically important for the timber frame, was entirely decorated with grand carvings (as can be seen in the image): Patriarch Abraham was depicted on the bottom alongside a ram with golden scales above. At the bottom of the girder a metal arm was attached to the building, holding golden scales. The name of the house seems to be derived from this object. The arm was located above the front door until 1899 and originates from the times when houses needed a clear, visual identifier due to the lack of house numbering. The scales that had been attached after the renovation was a detailed replica, while the original, which was exposed to the weather for nearly 400 years, was exhibited in the Museum for City History within the house.

The market-facing, northwestern corner pillar of the upper floors was as elaborately carved as its counterpart facing the cathedral square; however, this was mostly lost under the shadow of the overhangs of the neighboring house Weisser Bock (white buck) (house address: Market 7).

Finally, there was a wall dormer on the steeply sloping gable roof, typical of this type of houses covered with slate. The gable facing the market was curved in the typical renaissance fashion, which can also be seen on the stylistically related Salzhaus.

The names of the carpenters responsible for the construction were recorded: Friedrich Stammeler and Barthel Hilprecht, who probably also prepared the blueprints, even though this could never be proven. The roofer was called Niclaus Gebhard.

=== Inside ===
==== Ground floor and cellar ====
Two entrances led into the building: one was a door built in the southern arcade, as seen from Höllengasse (Hell's Lane); the second door was located on the market square in the middle of the northern side of the building. Entering the first door of the building, you reached a small rectangular yard that was open to the sky to the rear. A trap door leading to the basement was located directly behind the main door. Furthermore, a pump could be seen straight ahead when facing the western wall, though it was not working at the time the house was bought by the city. In addition, a well was located in the basement of the house to guarantee a water supply. Two further doors led out of the yard: a heavy wooden door on the northern wall and an even more solid, riveted wrought iron door with a door knocker on the western wall, which probably originated from Hamel's time and led directly to the vestibule of the rear building Alte Hölle (as can be seen in the image).

A barred window above the door leading to the vestibule allowed only little natural light to reach the room. At the southern wall you could see the outlines of a walled-up door leading to the neighboring house Stadt Miltenberg (Hell's Lane 11), which was once owned by Hammel just like the whole western row of houses on Hell's Lane. A further vaulted passage led from this point to the storage room of the Alte Hölle.

The ceiling of this room was decorated with paintings that originated from the second half of the sixteenth century. All in all this part of the building was older than the Goldene Waage: a walled-up archway included a keystone with the date 1577, whereas the Goldene Waage was only completed in 1619. The room was also connected to the backyards of the market by an iron door. Hamel still stored his goods in this room, later owners used it, among other things, as a stable for the horses, as proven by the mangers which were added later. Finally, various ancient vehicles were displayed in the museum. The room was a so-called Kellerhals ("basement neck") because a stairway once led from there to the basement of the Alte Hölle. The stairway became obsolete when the Alte Hölle was merged with the Goldenen Waage and part of the basement rooms was sold to die Grüne Linde located west of the market.

Changes to the house, such as the many doors which were walled-up over the centuries, the cellars, along with uncertainty as to the ownership gave rise to many myths and rumours, so people believed the Goldene Waage to be haunted.

The vestibule originally served the Alte Hölle's staircase, which revealed the very old style of construction: once, the vestibule was open towards the yard and arbor-like vestibules with wooden parapets were located in front of the upper rooms. This construction method was common for timber-framed houses in Frankfurt's historic center, even in the early 20th century. However, as part of the construction of the Goldene Waage, Hamel had ceilings installed in the vestibule and thus created further rooms above it. Since the rooms were considerably shorter than the original rooms of the Alte Hölle and also were not at the same height as the rooms of the Goldene Waage, as can be seen in the cross-section of the house, a tower containing a spiral staircase was constructed between the two buildings. On the ground floor the staircase was accessible via a wooden door in the northern wall of the yard opening to Hell's Lane.

Via the staircase one could first reach the store of the Goldene Waage located on the same level. The Museum of City History used it as a shop, as well as for special exhibitions. It could also be reached via a door in the northern wall of the house opening onto the market. Hamel had additionally used the room as a shop for his business. At the southern side one could reach the low intermediate storey, known as a Bobbelage, via a magnificently-crafted stairway (as can be seen in the image). The parapet was designed in the same style as the guard rail and was intercepted by a solid red sandstone pillar with an ionic capital as high as the room. The ceiling, situated only slightly above it, was crafted as a beautifully designed, painted coffer. This consists of two medallions framed by two strips of stucco, the eastern one depicting a female statue, scales and a sword, the western another female figure holding two snakes.

At the western wall it was again connected to the staircase. From this point, the first floor could be reached in just a few steps. Going there, one would pass the entrance to the first intermediate storey above the vestibule of the Alte Hölle to the west. According to an inventory in 1635, it was once used as a kitchen but is now, along with the room behind it, a library for the museum.

==== Second floor ====
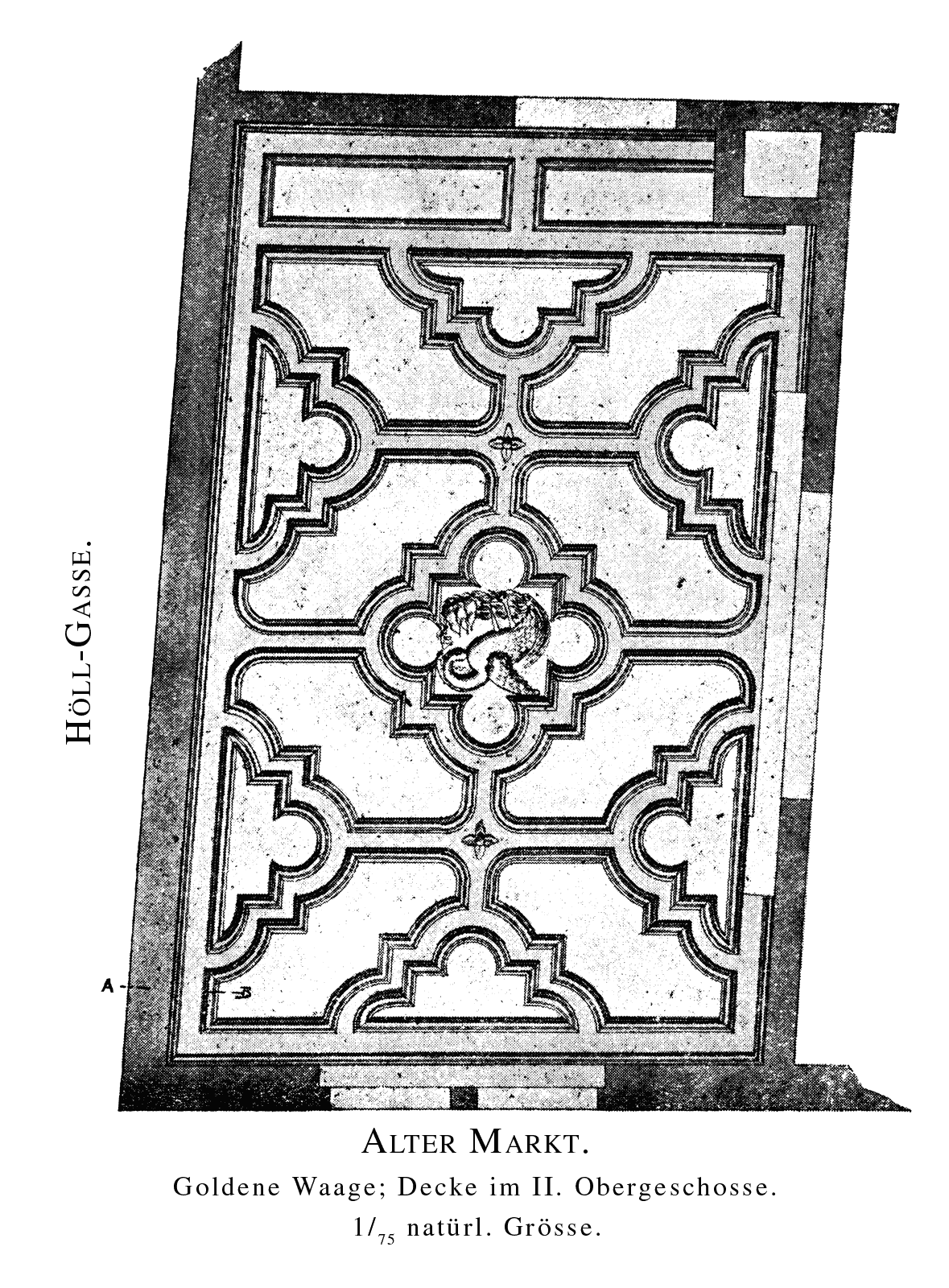
Stucco ceiling in the north-eastern room on the second floor

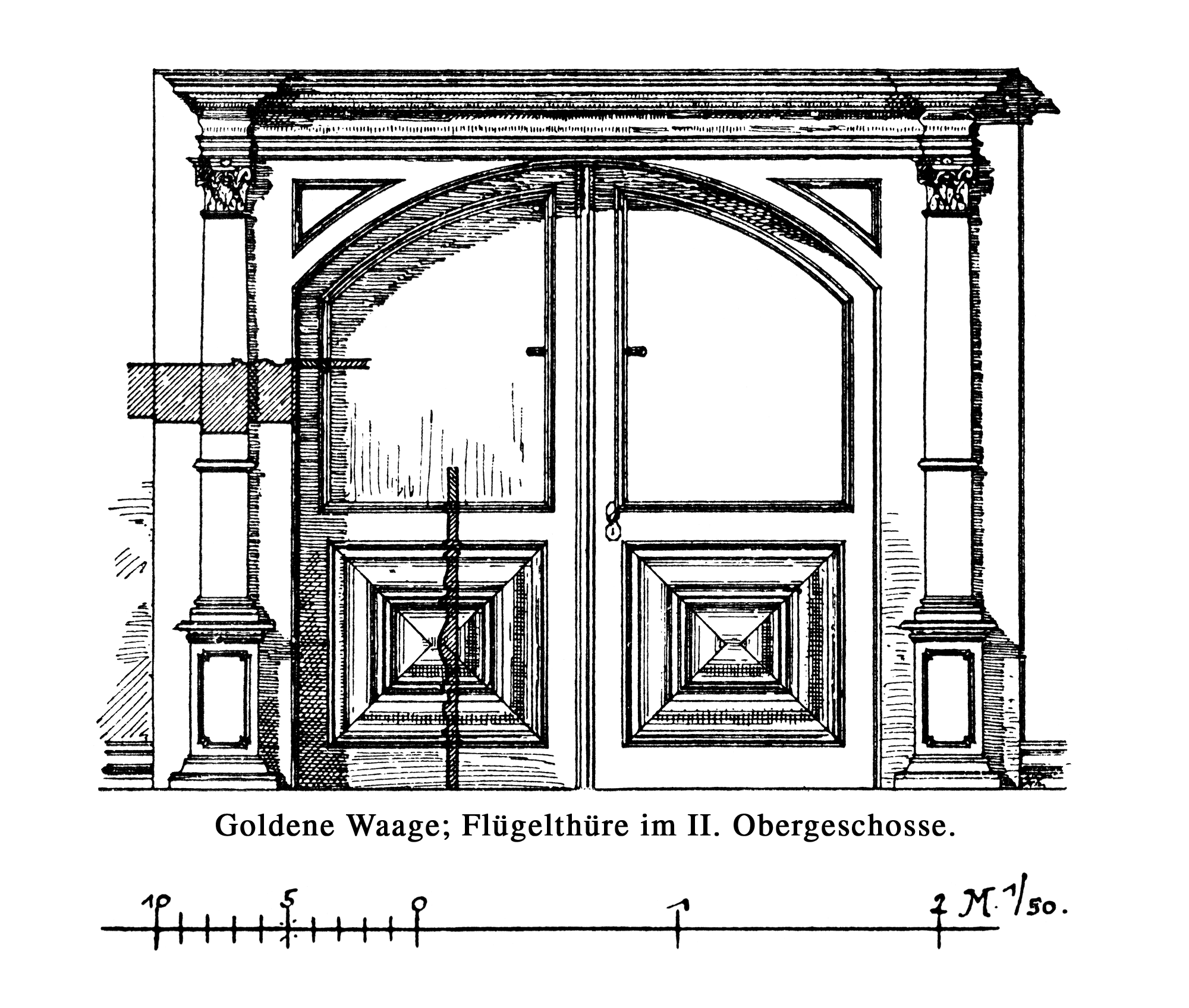
Double door on the second floor

In its structure the second floor was essentially identical with the floor below although the rooms north and south of the hallway had already been separated by intermediate walls during Hamel's time, resulting in four doors leading to four rooms in this part of the building.

At the end of the seventeenth century, when the house was owned by the Barckhausen family, additional renovations were carried out, for example, furnishing was obviously added. A rather simple stucco ceiling was built in the north-eastern room. It was divided in panels, showing a pelican feeding its fledglings – an indication that the room was used as a nursery. The pelican was also the crest of the Barckhausen family's coat-of-arms. Additionally, a big double door leading to the north-western room had been added (as can be seen in the image), flanked by detailed Corinthian pillars.

The remaining rooms on the floor were decorated far more plainly than the previous floors and included little decor originating from the earlier times of the house. Through the centuries they had been used as a bed-chamber or an office under different owners. The museum furnished them according to their presumed purposes an office, a music room, a kitchen and the chambers of a male resident, using much of the original decor.

Back in the stairwell the third intermediate floor above the vestibule of the Alte Hölle could be seen on the western side on the way to the roof. Although in contrast to the preceding intermediate floors, the western wall was open-worked here and led via a staircase to the slightly lower situated second floor above the storeroom of the Alte Hölle. In this area of the house, which was described as a workshop in an inventory in 1635, Hamel had once arranged cauldrons, pans and stoves for his original business. Via a staircase you could reach the attic of the Alte Hölle from this point. The attic was also called "chamber slightly above" in the inventory. Beside indications that a very basic sleeping area was arranged here for Hamel's apprentices, the attic was mostly used for storing the materials used in the workshop below it. The rooms, as well as both upper top floors of the Goldene Waage are now mostly used for the museum administration. The caretaker's apartment was in the extended attic of the Alte Hölle.

If you continued up the staircase, the stone steps turned into wooden ones and the timber-framed character of the stair tower revealed itself on the walls. On the southern side, a wooden hatch with a lift could also be seen, allowing the transport of goods and supplies from the courtyard to the attic.

== See also ==
- New Frankfurt Old Town
