= Heraldic courtesy =

Type of mirroring in heraldry

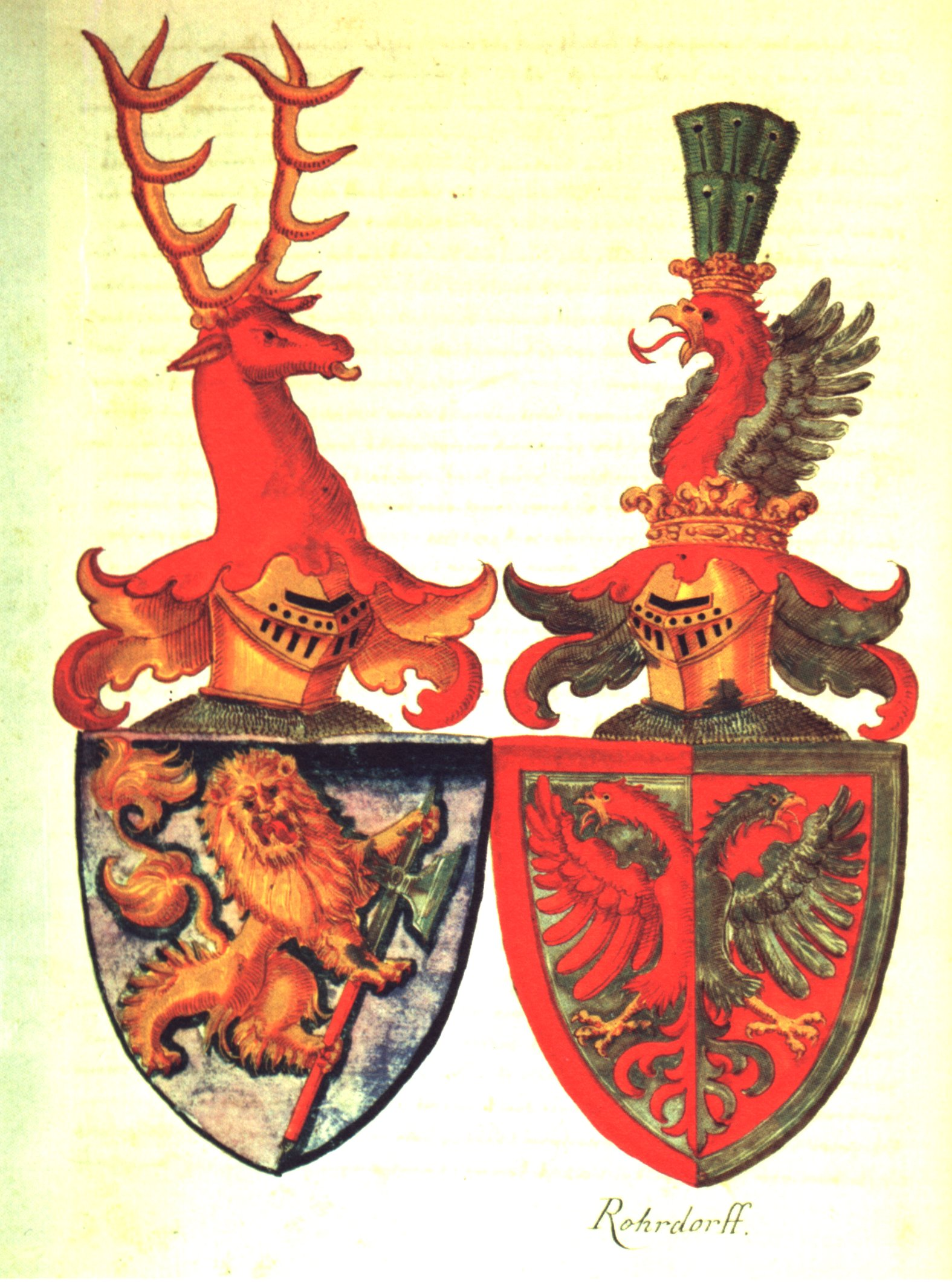
Arms of alliance; the husband's lion, which would normally face dexter, instead faces sinister toward the wife's shield

Arms of the dukes of Guelders and Jülich

Heraldic courtesy or courtoisie (French) is a practice typical of the heraldry of Germany (or more generally of the former Holy Roman Empire), in which coats of arms are mirrored if necessary so that helms and animate charges, such as lions, face the center of a composition. This may be done in arms of alliance (displaying the two shields of a married couple), as in the first illustration here; or within a single shield, such as that of the dukes of Guelders and Jülich in which the gold lion of Guelders turns to face the black lion of Jülich.

It can also be done on the left-hand side of a page of illustrations (such as in an armorial)

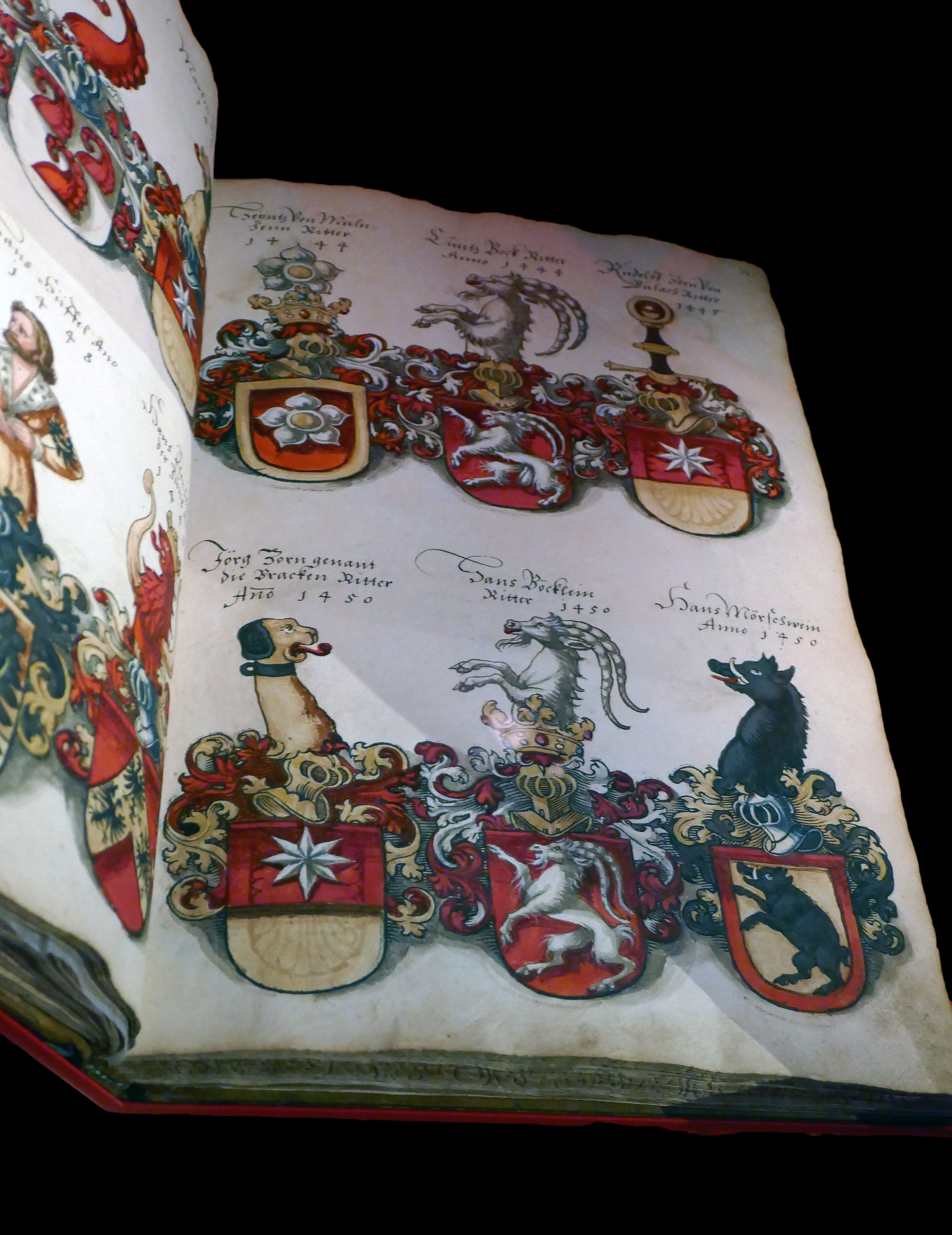
Page from an armorial showing the left-hand shields on the page drawn facing to sinister (the viewer's right). Note the top left shield which is facing to sinister as shown by the helm despite lacking animate charges.

== See also ==
- Arms of alliance
