= Arms of alliance =

Heraldic term to denote alliances by marriage

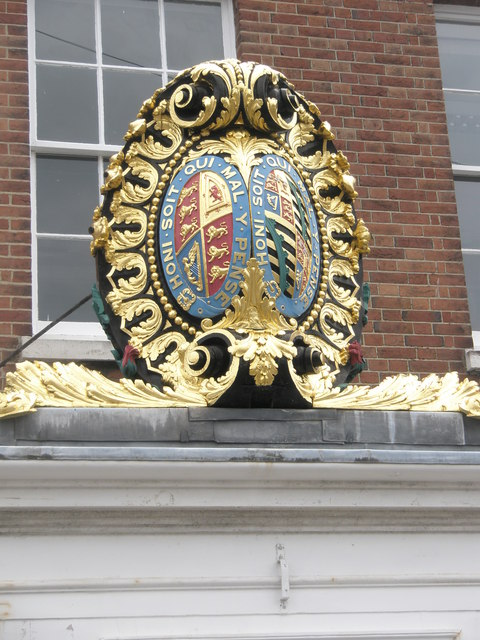
The arms of alliance of Queen Victoria, to the left, and Prince Albert of Saxe-Coburg and Gotha, to the right.

Arms of alliance refers to the heraldic practice of displaying two armorial bearings in their own right side by side, as opposed to impalement or dimidiation. Arms of alliance are acquired either by marriage or taken up by the children of heiresses to show their maternal descent. Arms of alliance are used almost exclusively by royalty and the nobility, while commoners typically impale the arms of both parties within a single shield.

== Gallery ==
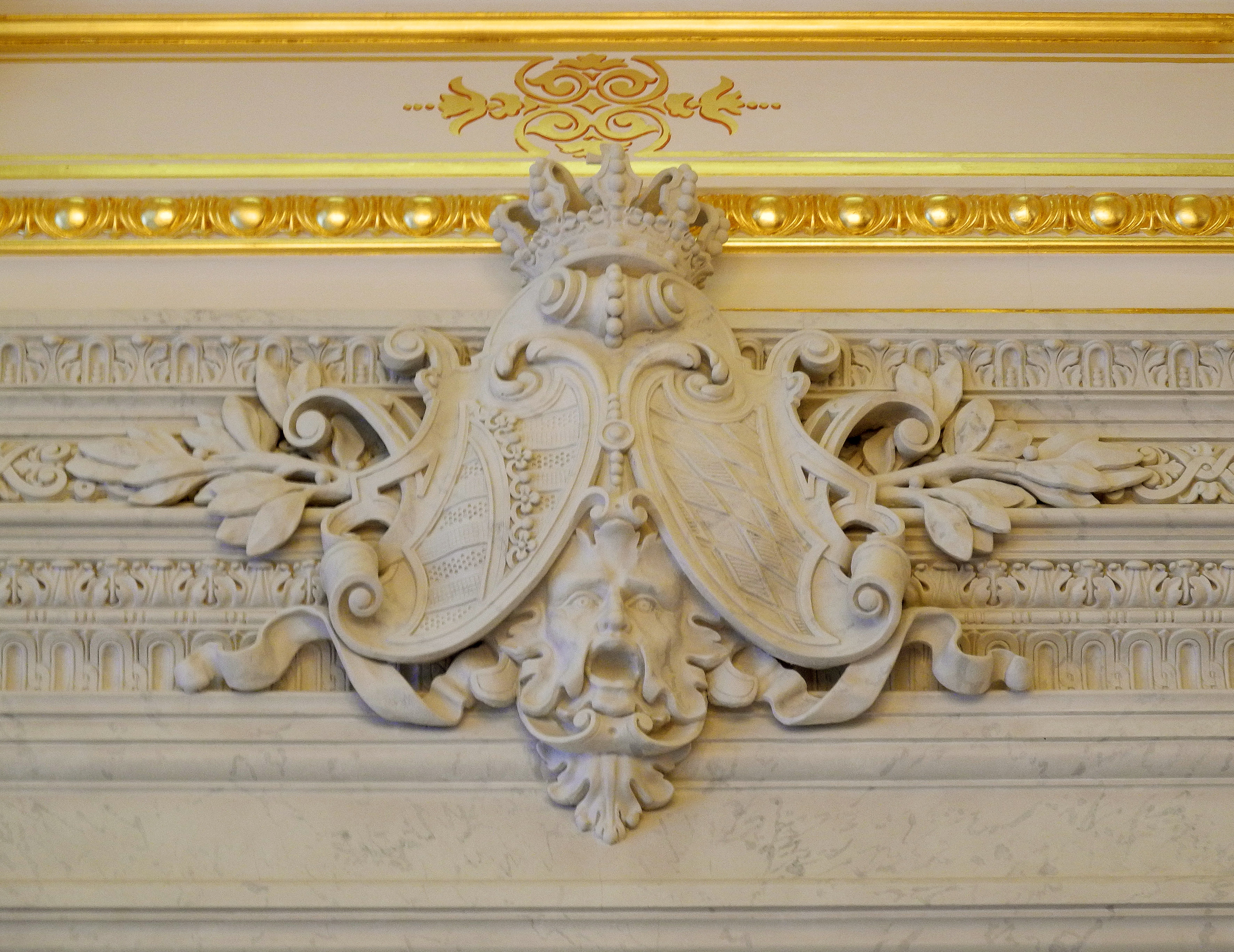
Kleiner-Ballsaal

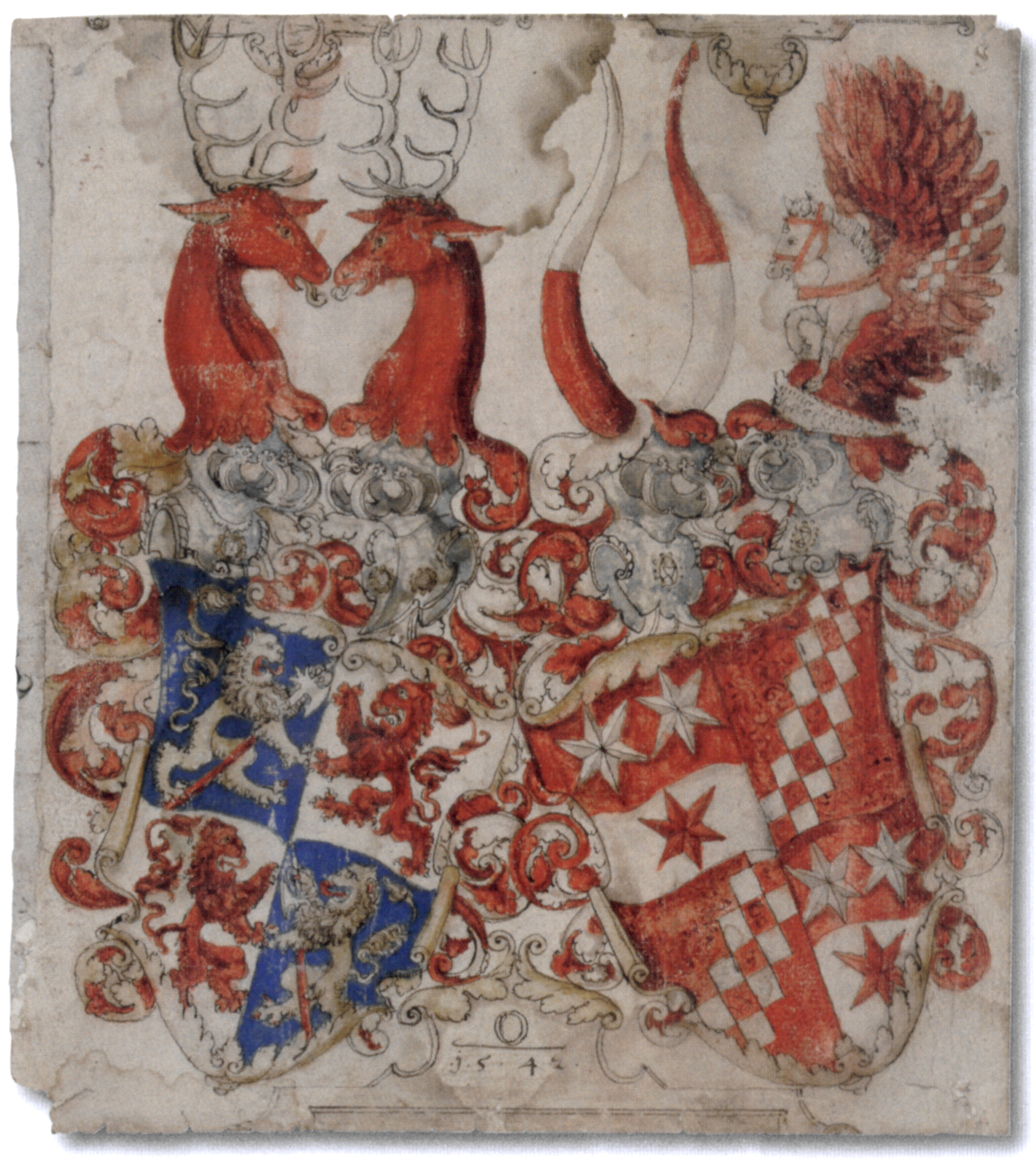
Zimmern-Erbach

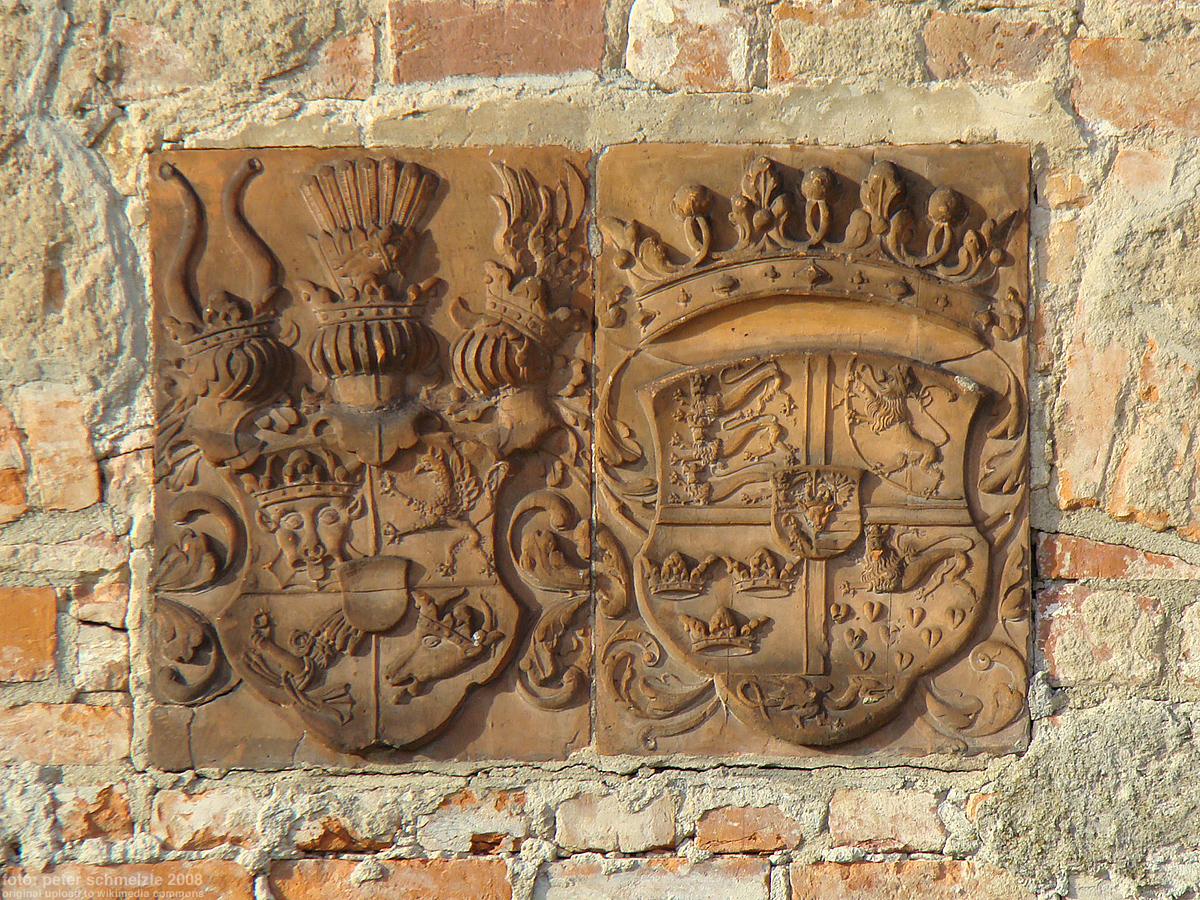
Dargun-Schloss

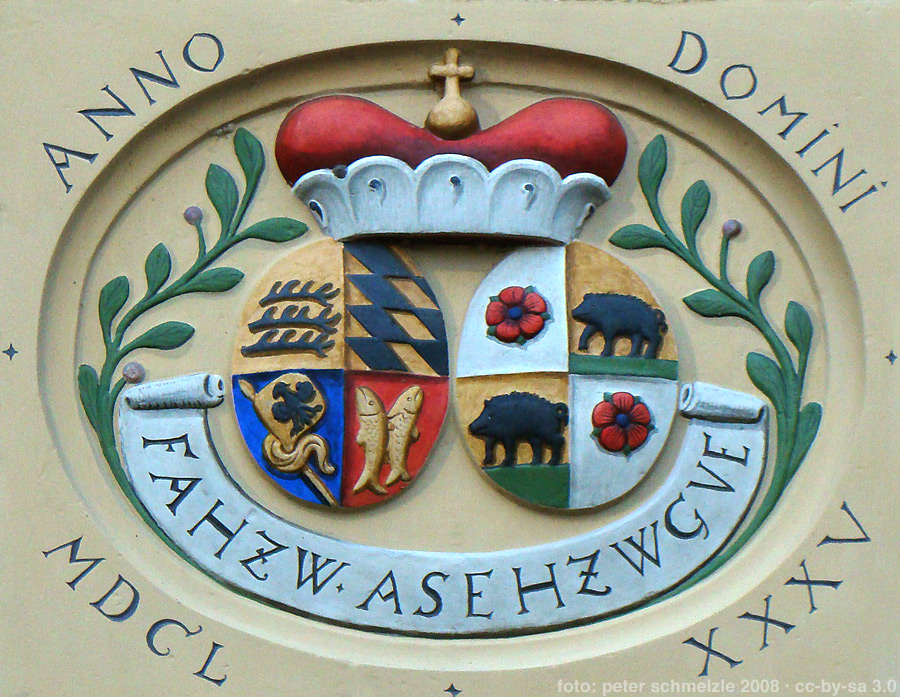
Gochsheim-Ebersteinwap

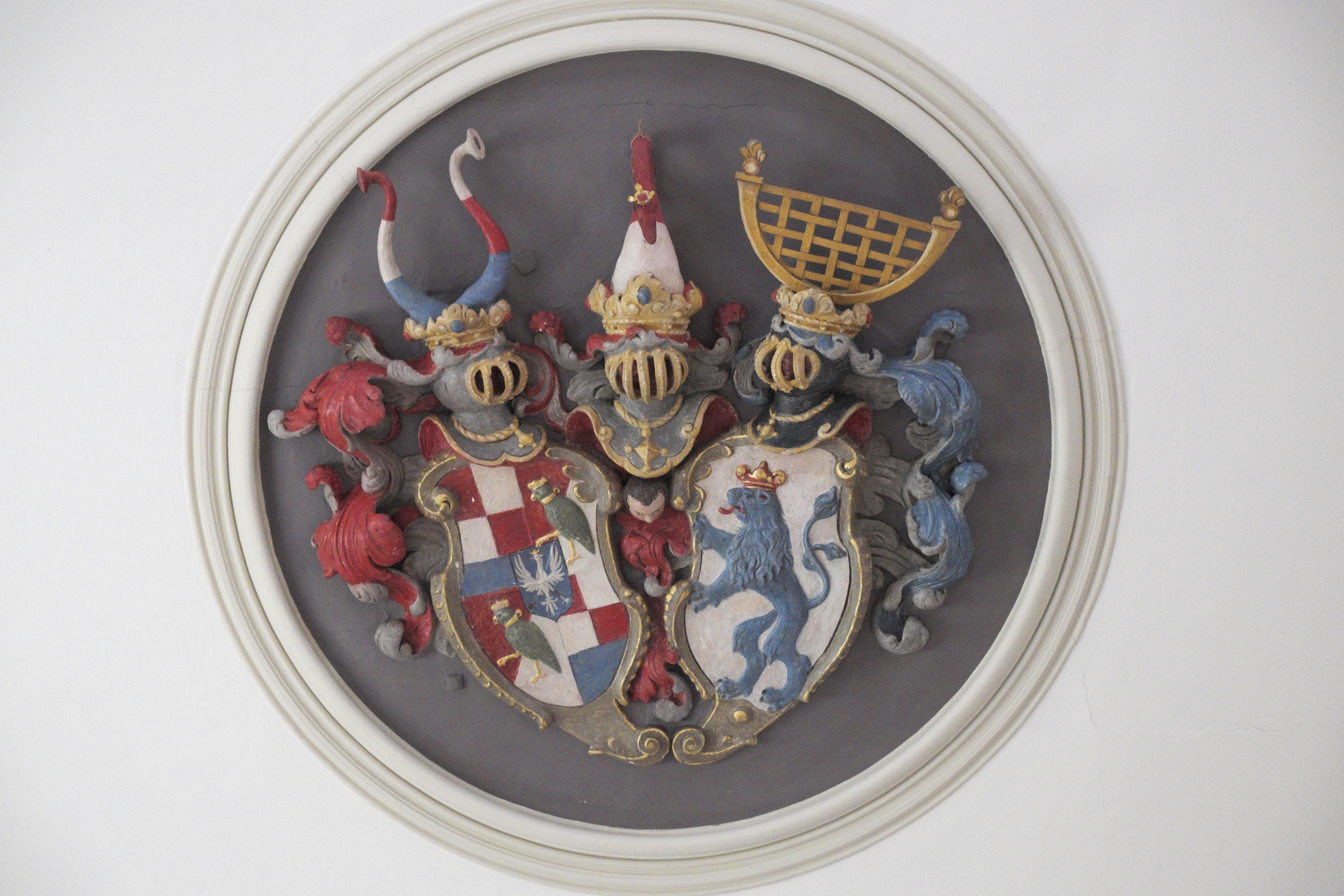
St. Cyriakus and St. Kilian

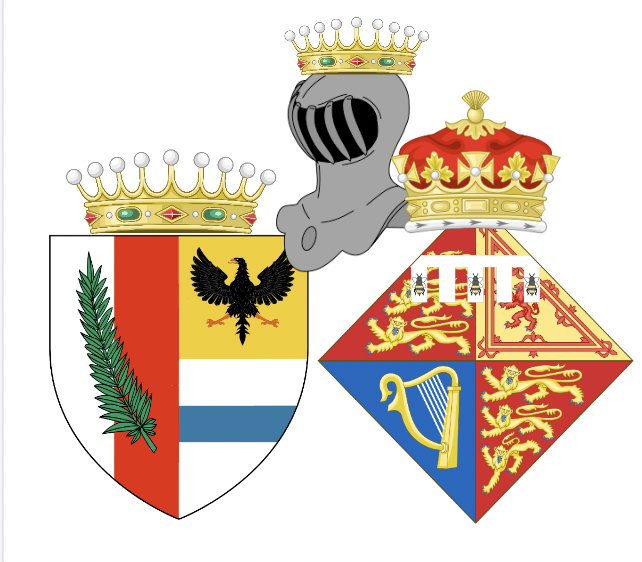
Count Edoardo Mapelli Mozzi & Princess Beatrice

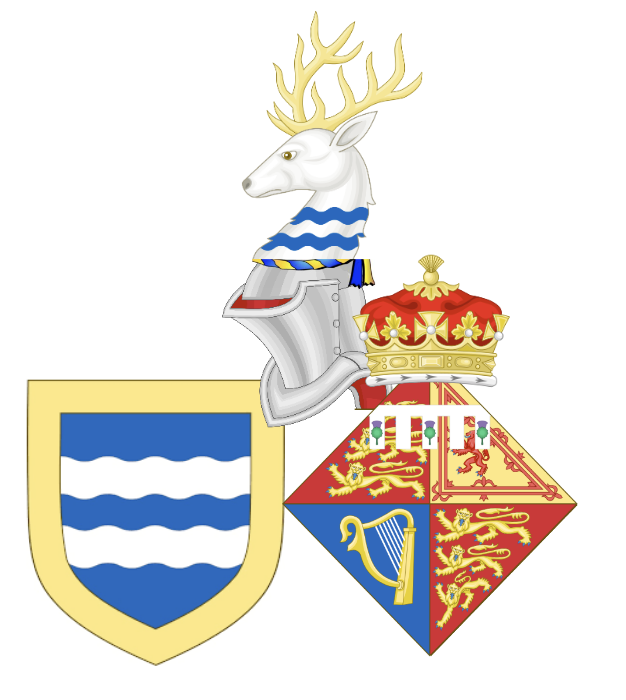
Mr. Jack Brooksbank & Princess Eugenie

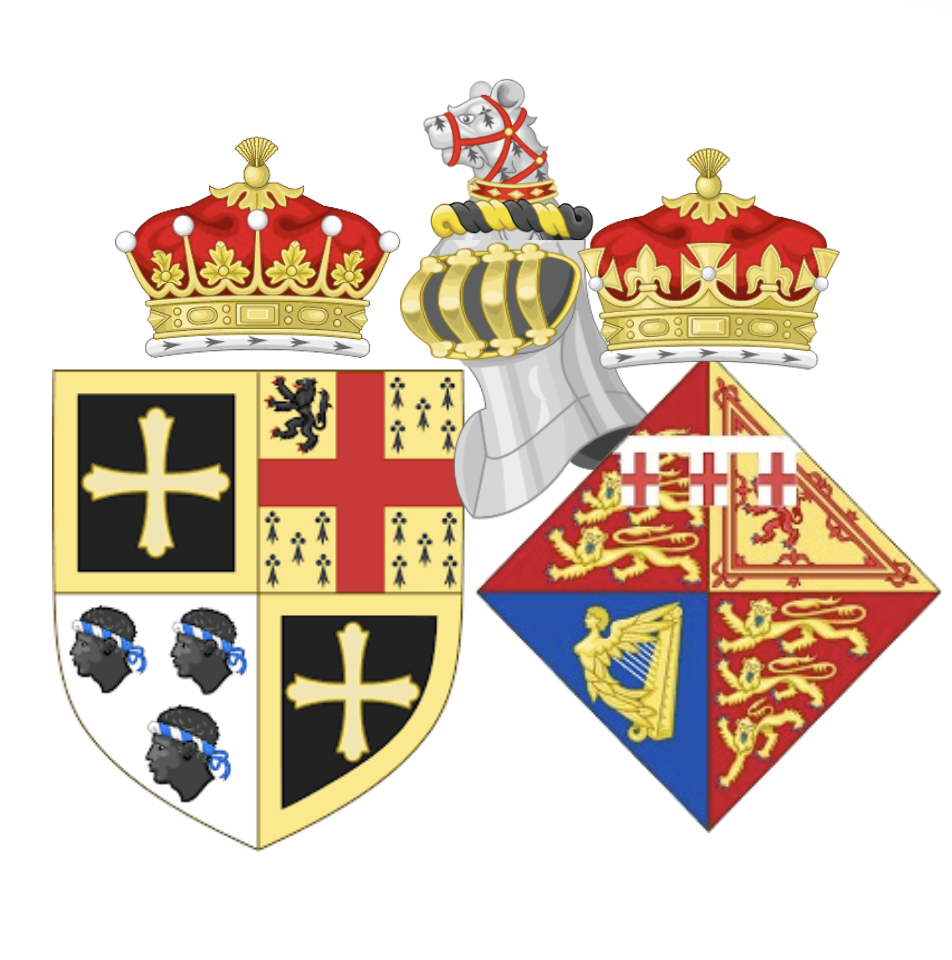
Henry Lascelles, 6th Earl of Harewood & Mary, Princess Royal and Countess of Harewood

Albert, Duke of York & Elizabeth Duchess of York (Future George VI & Queen Elizabeth, the Queen Mother)

== See also ==
- Heraldic courtesy
