= Law of Italy =

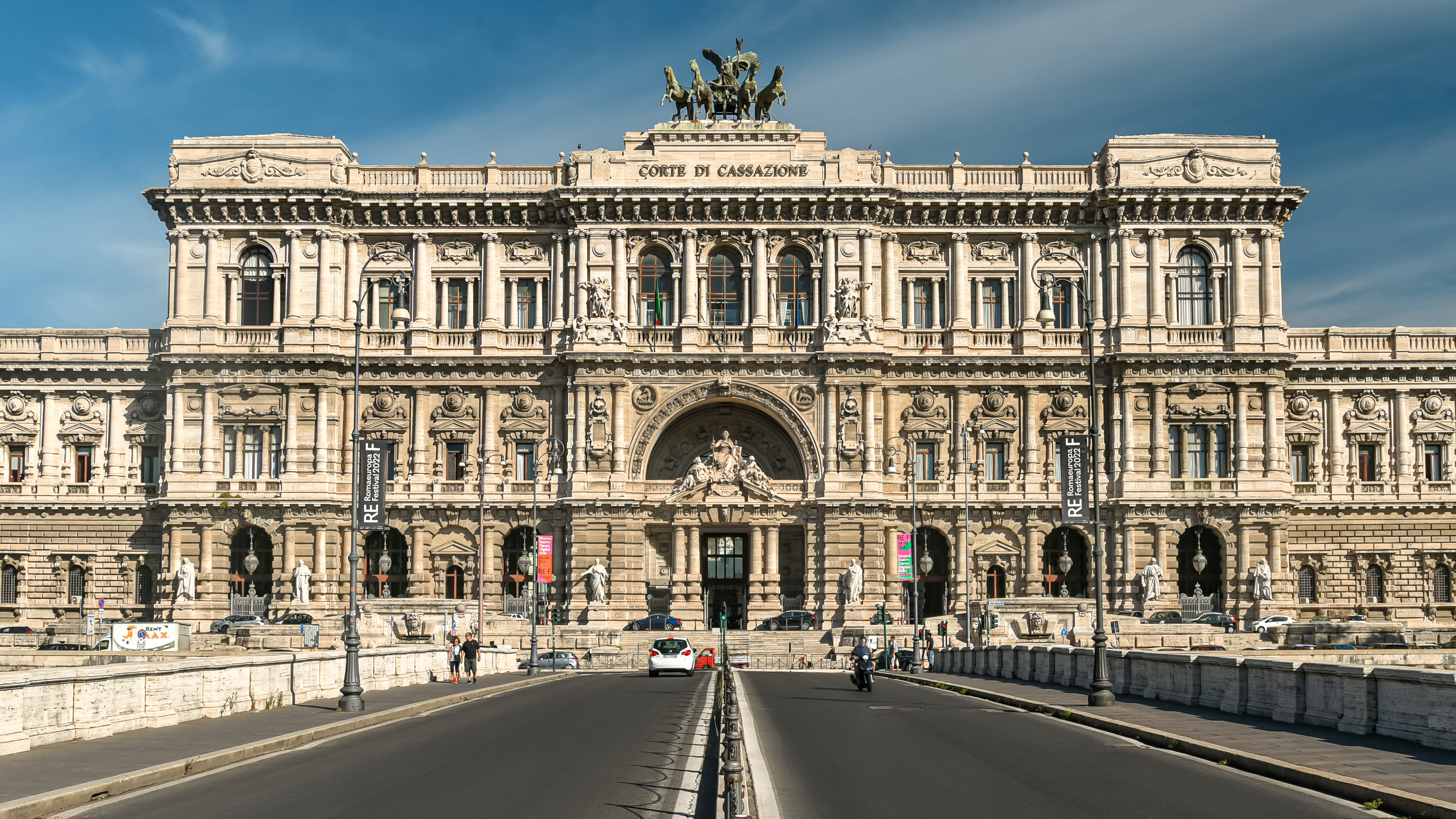
Supreme Court of Cassation, Rome

The law of Italy is the system of law across the Italian Republic. The Italian legal system has a plurality of sources of production. These are arranged in a hierarchical scale, under which the rule of a lower source cannot conflict with the rule of an upper source (hierarchy of sources).

The Constitution of 1948 is the main source. The Italian civil code is based on codified Roman law with elements of the Napoleonic civil code and later statutes. The civil code of 1942 replaced the original one of 1865. The penal code ("The Rocco Code") was also written under fascism (1930).

Both the civil code and the penal code have been modified in order to be in conformity with the current democratic constitution and with social changes.

== Legislative power ==
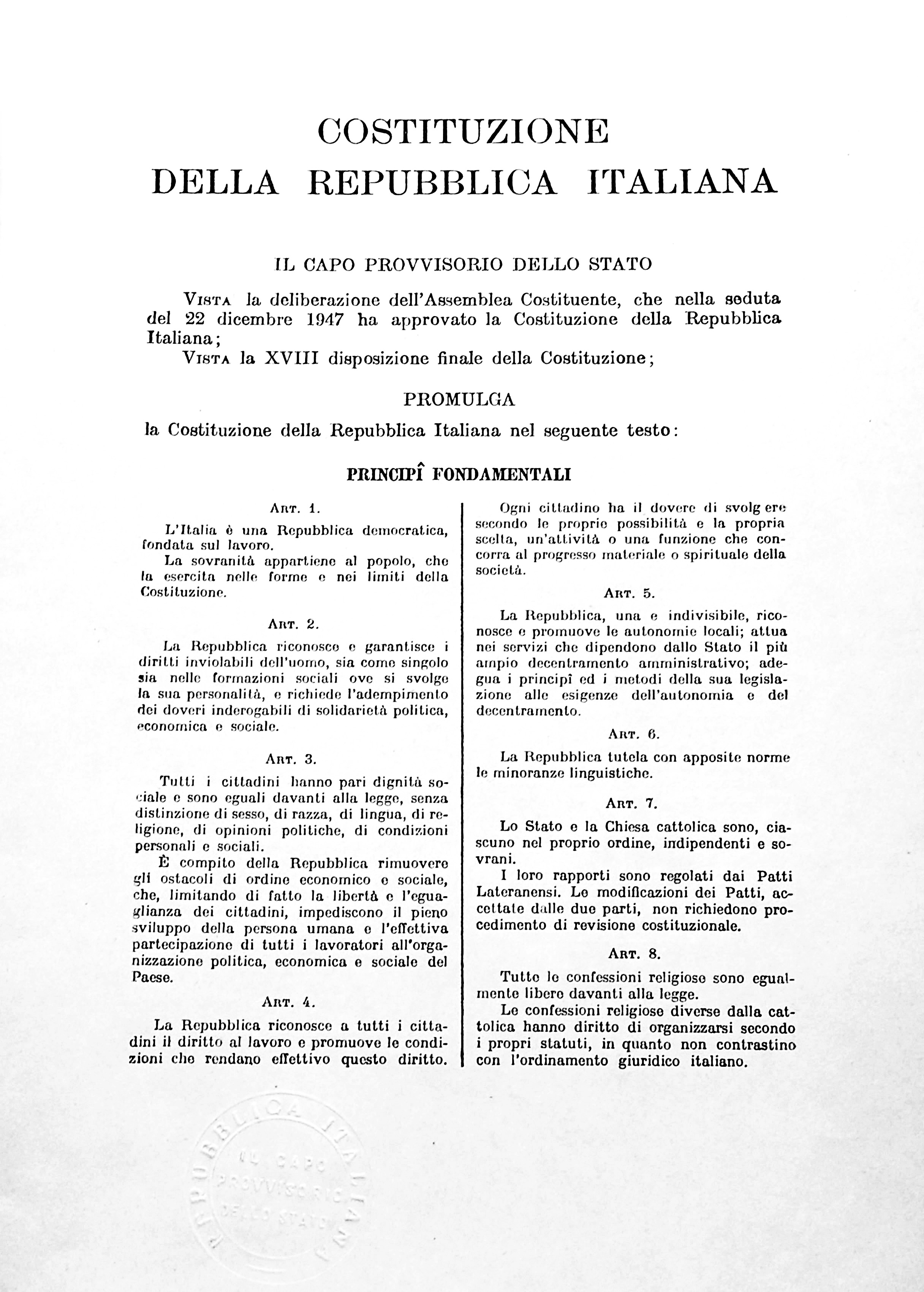
One of three original copies of the Constitution of Italy, now in the custody of Historical Archives of the President of the Republic.

Article 117 of the Constitution of Italy shares legislative power, according to the concerned matters, between Italian Parliament and regional councils. While a law ratified by the national Parliament is simply called legge and is enforced on the whole country, laws ratified by regional councils are named leggi regionali (regional laws) and can be applied only in the concerned region. Parliament is competent to legislate for the matters expressly indicated in the second paragraph of Article 117, while the Regions are competent to legislate for the remaining matters (residual competence).

There is also a second list of matters contained in the third paragraph of article 117 called matters of concurrent legislation, in which the Regions have legislative power, except for the determination of fundamental principles (framework laws), reserved to the State.

The Government can also issue an act having the force of law (called decreto-legge, "law decree"), but this must be confirmed later by Parliament, under penalty of forfeiture of the law decree. Furthermore, the Parliament can delegate the Government (through a law called legge delega, "delegation law", which must precede government regulation) to legislate on a certain subject, but at the same time establishes the margins within which the Government can move in legislating. The normative act issued in this way by the Government takes the name of decreto legislativo, "legislative decree". The power of legislative initiative is attributed to each parliamentarian, to the people, through the institution of the popular law proposal, carried out by collecting at least 50,000 signatures, and to the Council of Ministers, whose bills must however be countersigned by the President of the Italian Republic.

Still in the sphere of legislative power, there are some cases in which it belongs to the sovereign people: through the institution of the abrogative referendum and, in constitutional matters, through the institution of the confirmatory referendum of constitutional laws. All laws must be promulgated by the President of the Italian Republic who can postpone it only once, otherwise he would have the right to veto a law in Parliament if he considers that it is in conflict with the Constitution.

== Sources of law ==
In Italy the legal norms originate from the following sources:

- Internal sources:
  1. Constitution, which regulates the formation of laws and determines the discipline of regulatory acts;
  2. State and regional laws, as well as decrees (government acts issued when there is an urgent matter that requires timely intervention) and legislative decrees (acts issued by the government as delegated by the Parliament which establishes basic principles and indications that the government must follow to propose the law). More recently many laws were reorganised under different codes (Italian law codes) and testi unici (unified law);
  3. Government regulation, issued by the Government, ministers and other administrative authorities;
  4. Customary law, a source subordinated to the law and which can operate only within the limits permitted by the law itself.
- International sources: norms adopted by a group of states on the basis of one or more international agreements, united in a supranational organization, which stand above the individual laws of each member state but which have no direct effect on citizens. They are called treaties or agreements. In addition to written conventions, international customs must be included among the international sources.
- Acts of the European Union.
  1. European Union regulation;
  2. European Union directive.

With regard to external sources art. 117 of the Italian Constitution: "Legislative power is exercised by the State and by the Regions in compliance with the Constitution, as well as with the constraints deriving from the community order and international obligations".

== Private law ==
Private law is that part of a civil law legal system which is part of the jus commune that involves relationships between individuals, such as the law of contracts and torts (as it is called in the common law), and the law of obligations (as it is called in civil legal systems). In Italian law, the main regulatory body for private law is the Italian civil code, which governs both civil and commercial law. The Italian civil code was approved with Royal decree no. 262 of 16 March 1942 and entered into force on 21 April of the same year. It was born from the merger between the Italian Civil Code of 1865 and the Italian Commercial Code of 1882. It is divided into six books, composed in turn into titles, chapters, sections, as well as 2,969 articles. The six books deal respectively of people and family, heritage, property, bonds, working and protection of rights.

== Public law ==
Public law is the part of law that governs relations between legal persons and a government, between different institutions within a state, between different branches of governments, as well as relationships between persons that are of direct concern to society. Public law comprises constitutional law, administrative law and criminal law.

=== Constitutional law ===
Constitutional law is a body of law which defines the role, powers, and structure of different entities within a state, namely, the executive, the parliament or legislature, and the judiciary. The Constitution of the Italian Republic is composed of 139 articles (five of which were later abrogated) and arranged into three main parts: Principi Fondamentali, the Fundamental Principles (articles 1–12); Part I concerning the Diritti e Doveri dei Cittadini, or Rights and Duties of Citizens (articles 13–54); and Part II the Ordinamento della Repubblica, or Organisation of the Republic (articles 55–139); followed by 18 Disposizioni transitorie e finali, the Transitory and Final Provisions.

The Constitution primarily contains general principles; it is not possible to apply them directly. As with many written constitutions, only few articles are considered to be self-executing. The majority require enabling legislation, referred to as accomplishment of constitution. This process has taken decades and some contend that, due to various political considerations, it is still not complete.

=== Administrative law ===
Administrative law is the division of law that governs the activities of executive branch agencies of government. In Italian law, the main regulatory body for private law is the Italian administrative process code, which was approved with legislative decree no. 104 of 2 July 2010. It was issued in implementation of article 44 of the delegated law no. 69, which authorized the government to reorganize the administrative process, and entered into force on 16 September 2010. It includes 137 articles.

=== Criminal law ===
Criminal law is the body of law that relates to crime. It prescribes conduct perceived as threatening, harmful, or otherwise endangering to the property, health, safety, and moral welfare of people inclusive of one's self. Criminal law includes the punishment and rehabilitation of people who violate the penal laws. In Italian law, the main regulatory body for criminal law is the Italian penal code, which is one of the sources of Italian criminal law together with the Constitution and special laws. The Italian penal code was approved with Royal decree no. 1,398 of 19 October 1930, entered into force on 1 July 1931 and has been amended several times. The Italian penal code is organized into three books, which are in turn divided into titles, chapters, sections, paragraphs and articles, as well as 734 articles. The three books deal respectively of the crimes in general, of the crimes in particular and of the misdemeanors in particular.

== See also ==
- Italian law codes
- Judiciary of Italy
- Law enforcement in Italy

== Bibliography ==
- Guido Alpa & Vincenzo Zeno-Zencovich. Italian private law. NY: Routledge-Cavendish, 2007.
- Diana Cerini. Insurance law in Italy, 2nd edn. Alphen aan den Rijn: Kluwer Law International, 2019.
- Michele Colucci, Giuseppe Candela, Salvatore Civale, & Alessandro Coni. Sports law in Italy, 4th edn. Alphen aan den Rijn: Wolters Kluwer, 2018.
- Orazio Condorelli & Rafael Domingo, eds. Law and the Christian tradition in Italy: the legacy of the great jurists. Abingdon: Routledge, 2021.
- Astolfo Di Amato & Federica Fucito. Criminal law in Italy, 4th edn. Alphen aan den Rijn: Wolters Kluwer, 2020.
- Ettore Salvatore D'Elia & Mario Ragona. ‘Italy’, chap. 16 of Information Sources in Law, 2nd edn. Eds. Jules Winterton & Elizabeth M. Moys. London: Bowker-Saur, 1997, pp. 271-92.
- Giovanni Iudica & Paolo Zatti. Language and rules of Italian private law: an introduction, 4th edn. Rev'd by Stefano Liebman, Alberto Monti, & Alessandro Scarso. Trans. John Funck. Padua: CEDAM, 2012.
- Jeffrey S. Lena & Ugo Mattei, eds. Introduction to Italian law. The Hague: Kluwer Law International, 2002.
- Michael A. Livingston, Pier Giuseppe Monateri, & Francesco Parisi. The Italian legal system: an introduction, 2nd edn. Stanford, Cal.: Stanford Law Books, 2015.
- Pier Giuseppe Monateri, Filippo Andrea Chiaves, & Mauro Balestrieri. Contracts law in Italy. Alphen aan den Rijn: Wolters Kluwer, 2021.
- Alberto Toffoletto et al. Competition law in Italy, 2nd edn. Alphen aan den Rijn: Wolters Kluwer, 2019.
- Thomas Glyn Watkin. The Italian legal tradition. Dartmouth: Ashgate, 1997.
