= Judiciary of Italy =

Overview of Italian judiciary

The judiciary of Italy is one of the three branches of the Italian Republic under the constitution of 1948. Composed of a system of courts and public prosecutors' offices, the judiciary of Italy is tasked with the administration of justice. Both bench judges and public prosecutors, collectively called magistrates after the Roman tradition, hold office within this branch. The foundational attributes and roles of the Italian judiciary are delineated primarily by the Constitution of Italy, and are supplemented by statutes of constitutional significance.

In turn, magistrates are gathered in a collective body known as magistracy. Marked by an absence of internal hierarchy, the magistracy is also independent from any other branch of the state. In particular, the constitutional guarantee of independence protects career and honorary magistrates against the executive and legislative branches. In the Italian Republic, the government has no role in appointments or promotions, although the Minister of Justice oversees administrative resources and may request disciplinary proceedings. Career magistrates may serve until the mandatory retirement age of 70.

The Italian judiciary encompasses three independent judicial circuits. The ordinary judicial circuit handles civil and criminal matters. The specialised judicial circuit has exclusive jurisdiction over administrative, tax and audit matters. The military judicial circuit has jurisdiction over offences committed by service members in peacetime, although specific statutes provide broader attributions during wartime. The Constitutional Court of Italy lies outside the judiciary as an independent and separate constitutional institution tasked with reviewing the constitutionality of laws and settling conflicts among the branches of the state.

== Law ==
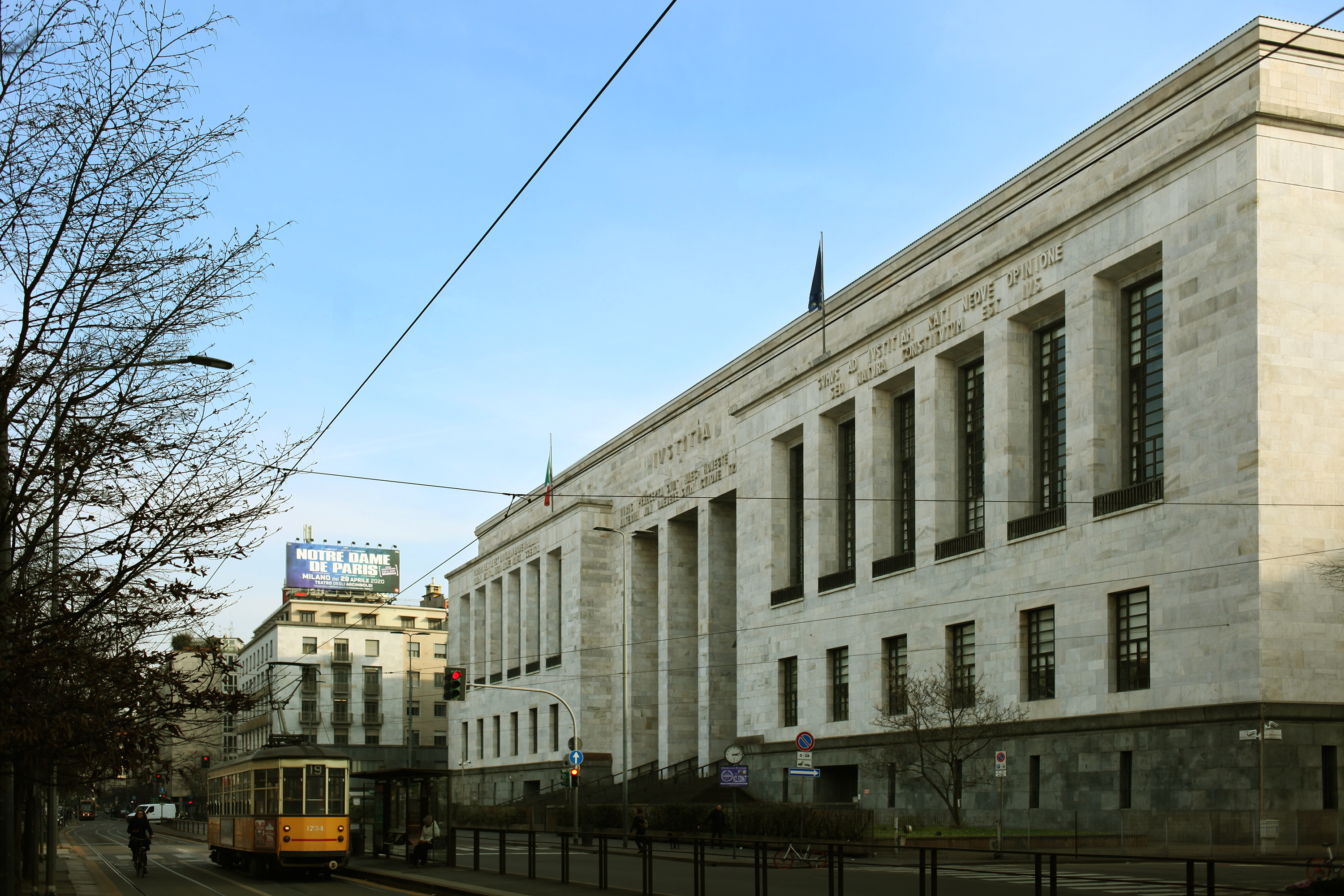
Courthouse in Milan, seat of the Tribunale, Procura della Repubblica, Corte d'appello, and Procura Generale della Repubblica. It is also known as Palazzo di giustizia (Palace of Justice).

=== General principles ===
The Italian legal system operates within the civil law tradition with a foundation in Roman law principles. This system emphasises codified statutes and legal codes as primary sources of legal authority, contrasting with common law systems where judicial precedents are more influential. The law of Italy, deeply embedded within the civil law tradition, is characterised by a systematic and hierarchical arrangement of legal norms. This structure is influenced by foundational principles that include the rule of law, the protection of fundamental rights, and the separation of powers. Central to these principles is the notion of legal certainty whereby laws must be clear, publicised, and stable, facilitating compliance and enabling predictability in legal outcomes.

=== Sources of law ===
In Italian law, sources are broadly classified into two categories: sources of cognisance and sources of production. Sources of cognisance are those through which the content of legal norms becomes known, including legal publications and official gazettes. Sources of production, on the other hand, are the mechanisms by which legal norms are created or modified. These include the Constitution, legislation, regulatory decrees, and international treaties.

Whilst the Constitution does not recognise case law as a formal source of law, it entrusts the judiciary, notably the Corte suprema di cassazione, with the responsibility to ensure strict adherence to and impartial application of the law. Similarly, case law is not listed as one of the sources of law by Article 1 of the preliminary provisions to the Civil Code. Although courts are free to depart from previous rulings, settled interpretation of a provision will be normally upheld by lower courts. In particular, legal principles affirmed by the Corte suprema di cassazione may have de facto authority over lower courts and, thereby, be deployed in court briefs and rulings for reasoning. The Ufficio del massimario within the Corte suprema di cassazione is entrusted with identifying and systemising the massime, namely, particularly important legal principles, for publication in the civil and criminal case reports.

=== Hierarchy of law ===
The hierarchy of legal norms in Italy is anchored by Constitution of 1948, which is the supreme law of the land. It establishes the foundational legal framework and principles that guide the creation, interpretation, and application of all other legal norms. Below the Constitution, the hierarchy includes primary legislation (laws passed by the Parliament as well by regional assemblies), secondary legislation (regulations and decrees issued by the executive), and tertiary norms (local laws and regulations). The Constitutional Court has a monopoly over the constitutional review of legal sources, ensuring that in particular statutory laws and regulations comply with Italian constitutional law and certain rights and liberties such as those set forth in the European Convention on Human Rights.

=== Legal codification ===
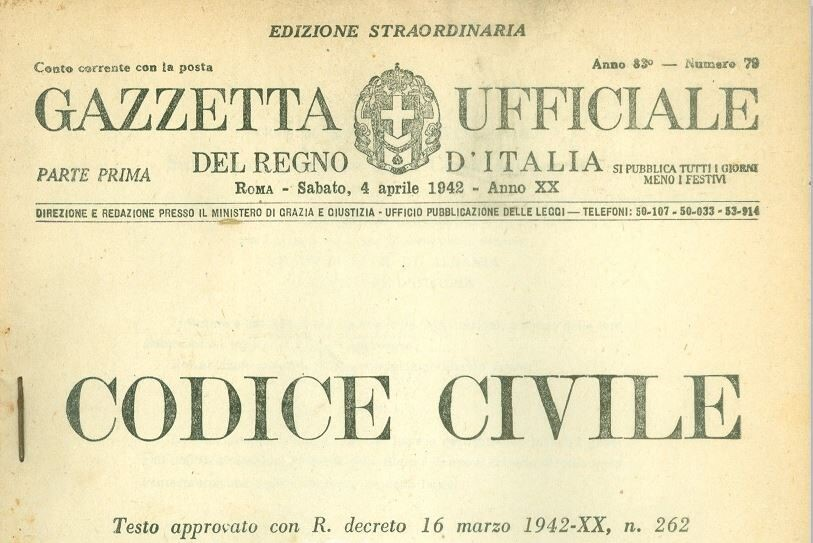
Frontpage of the Civil Code in the Gazzetta Ufficiale of 4 April 1942

The Italian Civil Code and the Italian Penal Code are central to statutory law. The Civil Code, significantly revised from its original 1865 enactment to the version introduced in 1942, addresses private law matters such as contracts, property, corporations and companies, labour, family relations, and inheritance. Originally, it incorporated influences from the German BGB and the Napoleonic civil code.

The Penal Code's evolution is particularly noteworthy. The first comprehensive Italian Penal Code, known as the "Zanardelli Code" named after former ministry Giuseppe Zanardelli, was enacted in 1889, featuring liberal principles including the abolition of the death penalty. In contrast, the 1930 Penal Code, often referred to as the "Rocco Code" after Minister of justice Alfredo Rocco, marked a shift in Italy's criminal law framework. This code reintroduced the death penalty and included provisions that emphasised state security and public order, reflecting the legal and social context of its time under the Fascist regime. Subsequent modifications to the Penal Code, especially following the adoption of the Constitution in 1948, have been aimed at aligning the legal system with the principles of democracy, human rights, and the rule of law.

== Constitutional principles ==
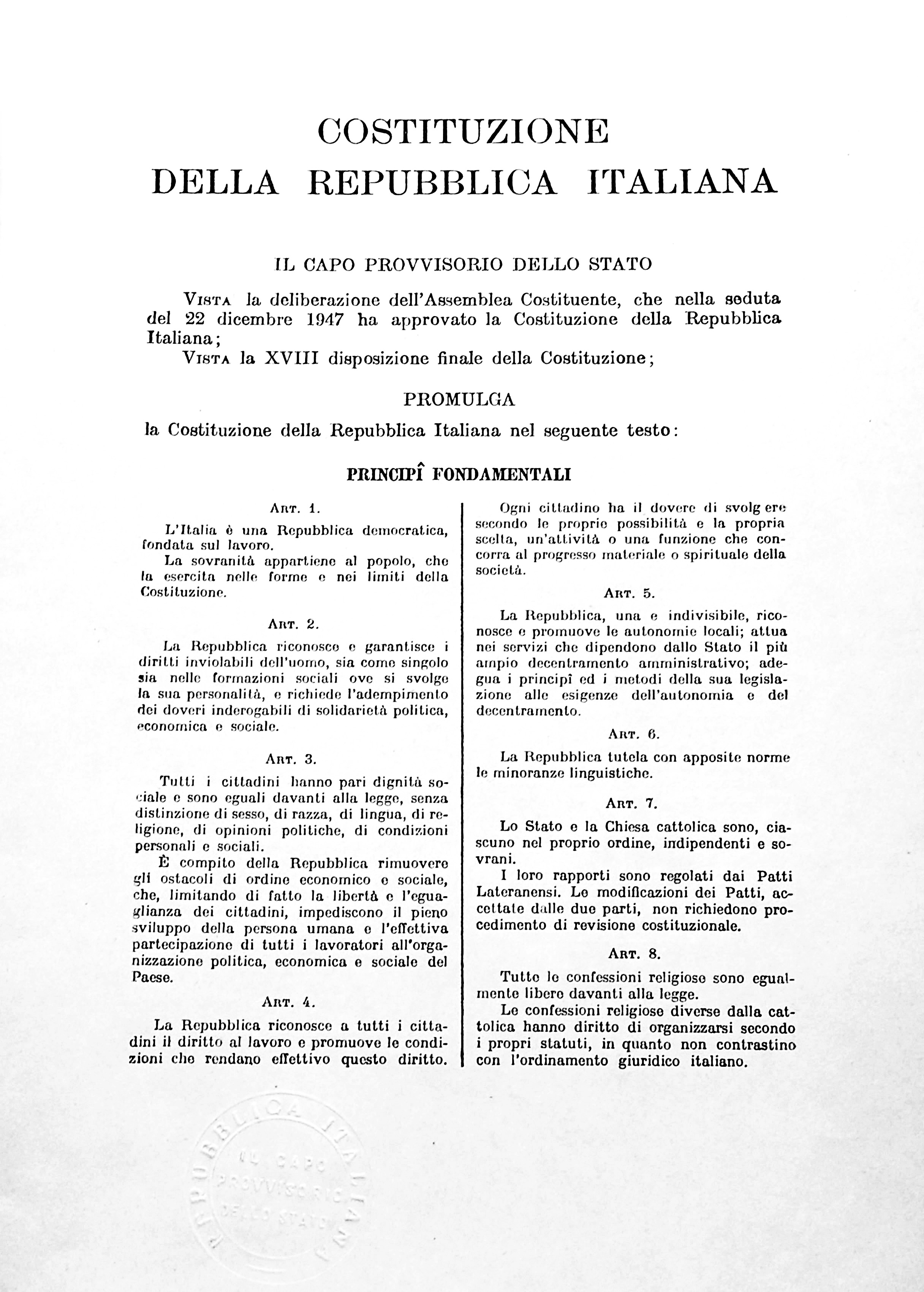
One of three original copies of the Constitution of Italy, now in the custody of Historical Archives of the President of the Italian Republic

=== Independence ===
As stipulated in Article 104 of the Constitution of the Italian Republic, the judiciary operates as an autonomous branch of the state whose province is the interpretation and application of the law. Article 101 reinforces this autonomy, asserting that magistrates are bound solely by the law, thus insulating their decision-making from influence by other state powers or other magistrates' judicial decisions ("external independence"). This independence is further characterised by a non-hierarchical structure among magistrates, with distinctions made only based on the functions vested in them ("internal independence"), as per Article 107 paragraph 3. Public prosecutors offices are independent, and cannot be influenced by the legislative, executive or political power in general. Prosecutors have a legal monopoly over the initiation of criminal proceedings, thereby acting in full independence but endorsing some form of direct, or indirect, responsibility vis-à-vis the public.

=== Accountability ===
Article 28 of the Constitution holds accountable public servants and employees of public bodies under criminal, civil and disciplinary laws for any act carried out to the detriment of citizens' rights. This accountability extends to the State and public entities involved in the administration of justice. Italian magistrates are not directly liable for acts owing to the exercise of judicial or prosecutorial functions. Law 117/1988 of 13 April 1988 applies the principles laid down in Article 28 of Constitution by allowing individuals to file a liability claim against the State where a magistrate willfully or carelessly carried out judicial or prosecutorial duties, or a denial a justice was brought about owing to the magistrate's conduct. In the event of liability, the State can claim reimbursement of damages to the concerned magistrate within the limit of one-third of annual salary.

=== Recruitment ===
Access to the ordinary, administrative, tax or audit magistracy is differentiated. Article 106 of the Constitution only requires the organisation of a public examination to provide for the appointment of magistrates; the office is not subject to electoral appointment. Exceptionally, the High Council of the Judiciary is authorised, pursuant to Article 106 paragraph 2 of the Constitution, to appoint highly qualified university professors of law or lawyers as Councilor of Cassation (consigliere di Cassazione), who only operate within the Corte Suprema di Cassazione.

=== Discipline and organisation ===
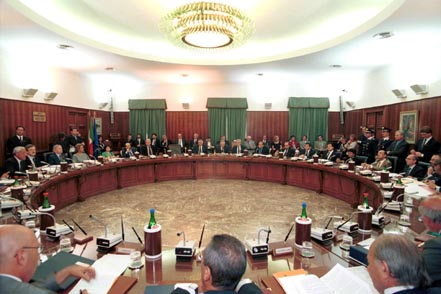
High Council of the Judiciary in session

Judges and public prosecutors, once appointed, enjoy security of tenure, subject to removal only with their consent or by decision of their governing body, based on specific legal grounds. In order to sanction an Italian magistrate, the prosecuting body must ensure compliance with the due process of law clause. The High Council of the Judiciary, an institution of constitutional importance chaired by the President of the Italian Republic and effectively led by a vice-chair who is also a member of the Parliament plays a pivotal role in safeguarding the ordinary judiciary's independence. It oversees appointments, promotions, transfers, and disciplinary actions, as empowered by Article 105 of the Constitution.

Parallel to the ordinary judiciary, the special judiciary is governed by separate independent bodies. The administrative magistracy operates under its own governance, as outlined in Article 120 of the Constitution; likewise, the audit and tax magistracies are governed by distinct independent institutions. Governance of administrative magistrates is vested in the Managing Board of the administrative justice, established by ordinary law no. 205/2000, whereas audit and tax magistrates' governance fall under the purview of the Presidency Council of the Court of Auditors and the Supreme Council of Tax Justice, respectively.

=== Courts ===
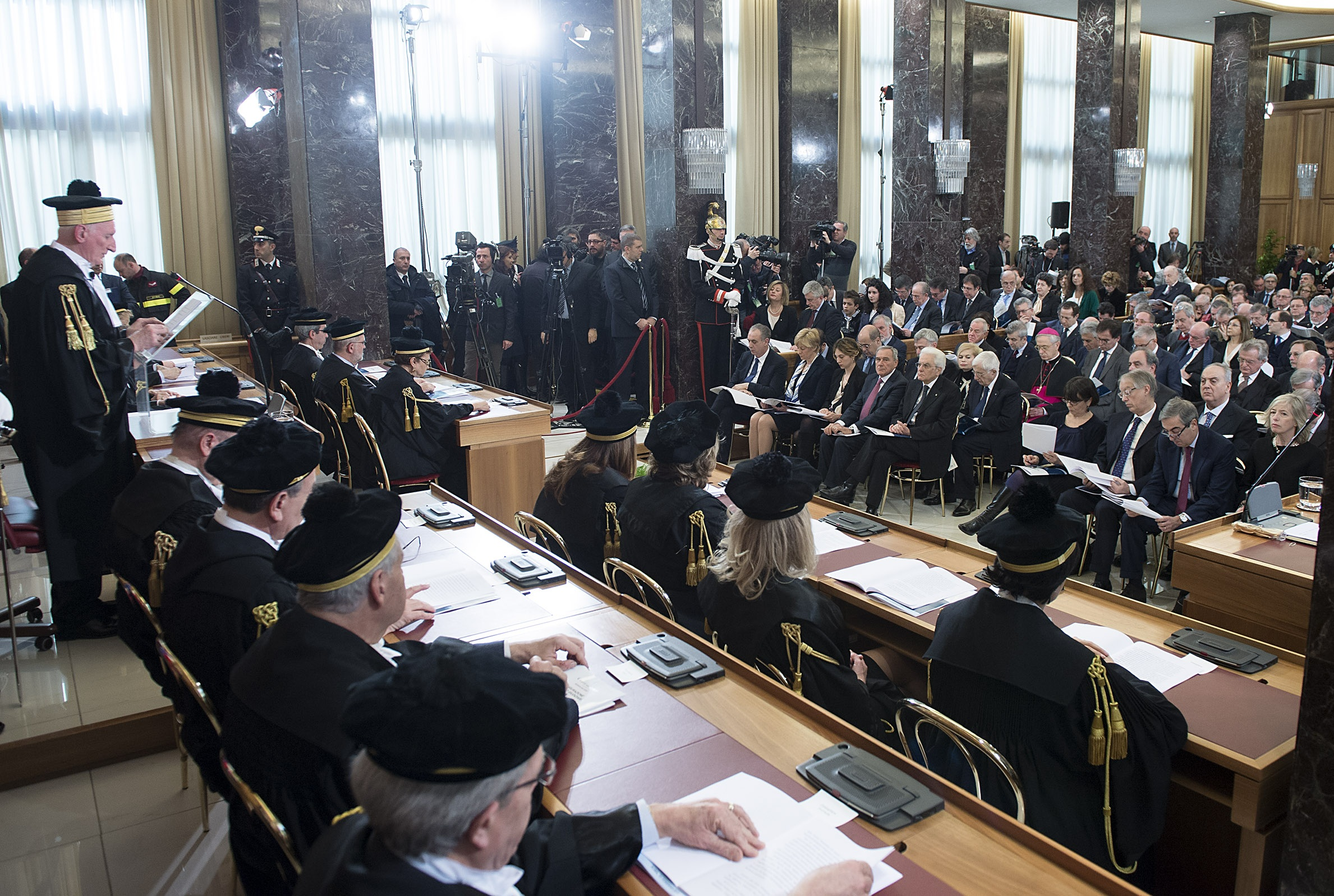
Inauguration of the judicial year in 2015

The two main courts foreseen by the Italian Constitution are the Corte Suprema di Cassazione and the Consiglio di Stato. The former operates within the judiciary framework, particularly guided by the principles set forth in Article 111 of the Constitution, functioning as Italy's apex court in the system of appeals. This court is mandated by law to ensure the exact and uniform application of the law in disputes pending before Italian courts, exclusive of fact-related issues. However, as per Article 101 of the Constitution, which states, "The justice is administered in the name of the people. Judges are subject only to the law," the decisions of the Corte Suprema di Cassazione, while highly authoritative and persuasive, do not have formal binding precedent. In reality, the principles set forth by this court bind the court where a case is remanded and, to some extent, inform the application of the interpreted provisions in similar future cases.

The Consiglio di Stato, explicitly referred to in Article 100 of the Constitution, fulfills a twofold role. It acts as an advisory body to the executive, ensuring lawful administrative action, and as an administrative court, it protects citizens' rights against public administration, ensuring that administrative decisions comply with legal standards. In the Italian legal system, the Consiglio di Stato (Council of State) is a body of constitutional significance. As per Article 103 of the Constitution, the Consiglio di Stato must remain neutral vis-à-vis the Italian public administration.

=== Procedural principles ===
The Constitution articulates several principles that define the judiciary's legal framework and prerogatives. Judges must be predetermined by law, as mandated by Article 25, ensuring that no judge is specially appointed to a case, thereby safeguarding judicial impartiality. Moreover, Article 102 paragraph 2 prohibits the establishment of extraordinary or special tribunals, reinforcing the judiciary's consistency and independence. The Italian judiciary has also authority over the Italian judicial police, integrating its role in the enforcement of law and order within the Italian legal system.

== Legal status ==
=== General provisions ===
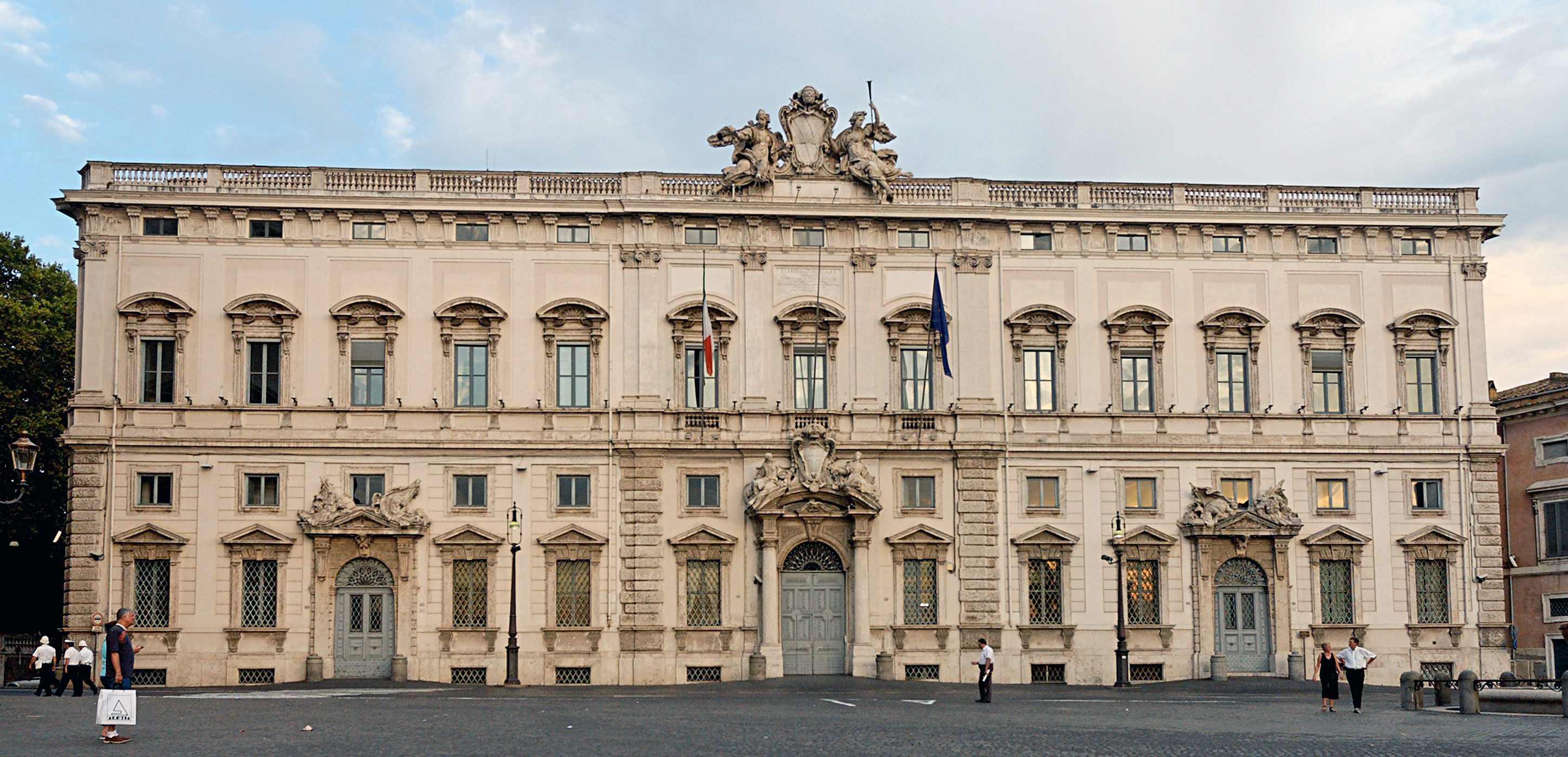
Palazzo della Consulta in Rome, seat of the Constitutional Court of Italy

Magistracy, in Italy, designates the body of civil servant who hold one of the three independent powers of the State, that is to say the judicial power or judiciary. These civil servants are known as magistrates, namely, those who are called upon by law to read and apply statutes, administrative acts and non-constitutional sources in cases brought before courts, including but not limited to disputes among individuals. Magistrates have jurisdiction to apply constitutional sources and ensure protection and enforcement of rights created upon individuals. The constitutional review of any legal source rests exclusively with the Corte Costituzionale (Constitutional Court), an independent institution foreseen by the Constitution, which falls outside the judiciary.

Given the constitutional importance, the ordinary and special magistrates' legal status is primarily governed by Section I of the Constitution (in Title IV, Part II), and completed by statutes as regards the salary, certain employment-related benefits (e.g. days of holidays), retirement and pension, as well as the possibility to temporarily step out of tenure to work in other branches of the administration. Additionally, the legal framework recognises the unique responsibilities and risks associated with judicial functions, particularly for those serving in the criminal justice system. Public prosecutors and judges working within criminal divisions are entitled under the law to carry firearms, a measure aimed at enhancing their personal security given the potential threats they may face due to the nature of their work.

== Judicial stream ==
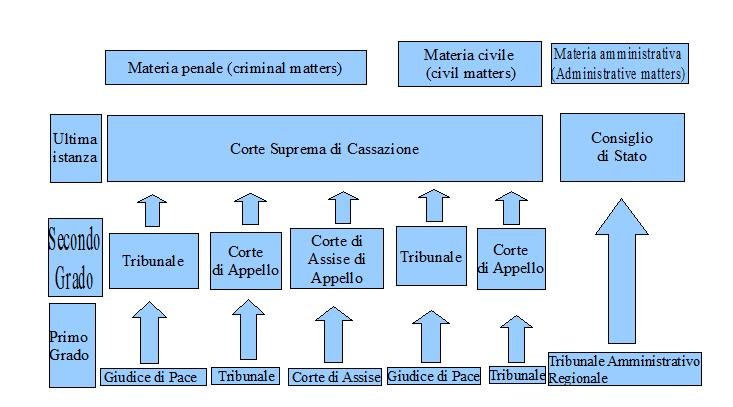
Italian Court system

The Italian judiciary comprises courts that adjudicate disputes and intervenes ex officio where the law so requires, thereby interpreting, defending and applying the law in the Italian Republic, as well as public prosecutor offices who have a legal monopoly over the initiation of criminal proceedings and standing in several civil or commercial instances (e.g. proceedings involving a minor, bankruptcy, etc.). A further distinction is made between the ordinary judicial circuit, which encompasses civil and criminal courts, from the special judicial circuit, which embeds specialised courts in administrative, tax and audit matters. The judicial system is divided into one, two or three tiers (gradi, sing. grado): primo grado (first instance), secondo grado (instance of appeal), and ultima istanza (last resort) also called terzo grado (third tier) depending on the judicial circuit competent to hear the dispute at hand. In general, inferior courts have original and general jurisdiction, intermediate appellate courts hear cases on appeal from lower courts, and courts of last resort rule on appeals from lower appellate courts on matters of interpretation of the law.

Public prosecutor offices, called Procura della Repubblica, are organised within each tribunal, court of appeal and even the Corte Suprema di Cassazione. This court has not jurisdiction over the special judicial circuit, which includes administrative, tax, and audit courts. These specialised areas of law are managed by separate courts with specialised supreme courts, such as the Consiglio di Stato for administrative disputes and the Corte dei Conti for public finance matters The Corte Suprema di Cassazione is Italy's highest court in civil, criminal and tax matters, whose competence extends to issues related to the interpretation and meaning of the law, normally exclusive of fact-related disputes. Whilst the doctrine of stare decisis is not provided for under Italian law, the Corte Suprema di Cassazione's rulings exert legal suasion over lower courts to adjudge future disputes.

=== Ordinary judicial circuit ===
==== Courts ====
===== Civil matters =====
====== Giudice di pace ======
The Giudice di pace (Justice of the Peace) is the court with original jurisdiction for less significant civil matters. In 1991, the court replaced the old preture (Praetor Courts) and the Giudice conciliatore (Judge of Conciliation).

====== Tribunale ======
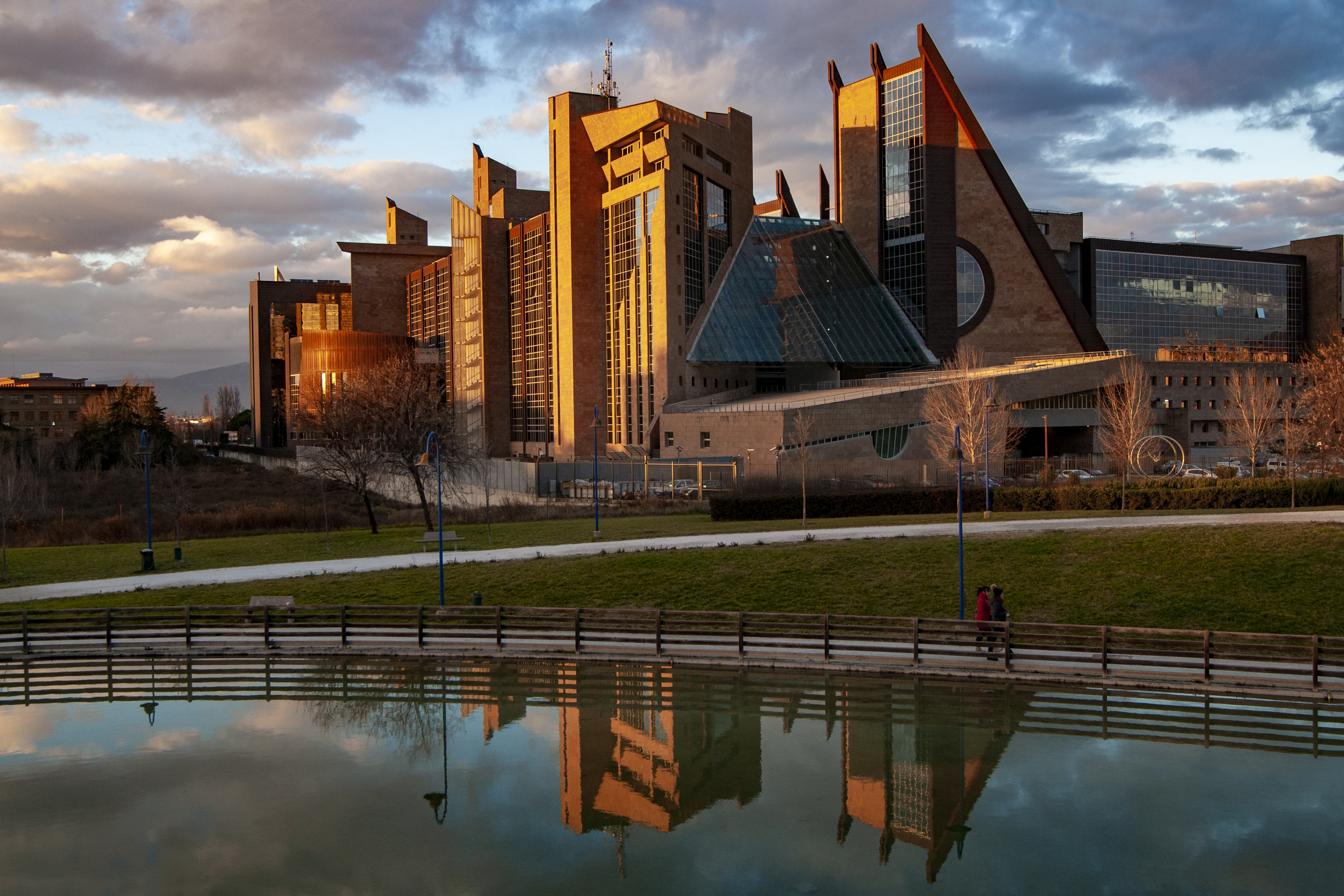
Tribunale's seat in Florence

The Tribunale (Tribunal) is the court with general jurisdiction for civil and criminal matters. One notable feature of the Tribunale's proceedings is the requirement for legal representation. Unlike some jurisdictions where parties can represent themselves (pro se), in most subject-matters before the Tribunale, individuals are mandated to seek the assistance of an Italian attorney at law (avvocato). In the judicial arrangement of the Tribunale, the panel is composed variably of either a single judge or a panel of three judges. This structure is contingent upon the complexity, significance and the subject-matter of the case at hand. In scenarios where the matters are straightforward or less significant, a single judge (giudice monocratico) presides over the proceedings. Conversely, for cases of greater complexity or higher importance, a panel of three judges (collegio) is convened to ensure a more comprehensive evaluation and decision-making process. Additionally, Tribunals also hear cases on appeal from Courts of Peace. In this appellate capacity, the adjudicating panel is consistently composed of a single judge. This structure underscores the Tribunal's role in providing a secondary level of review and adjudication in the Italian legal system.

====== Divisions and specialised divisions ======
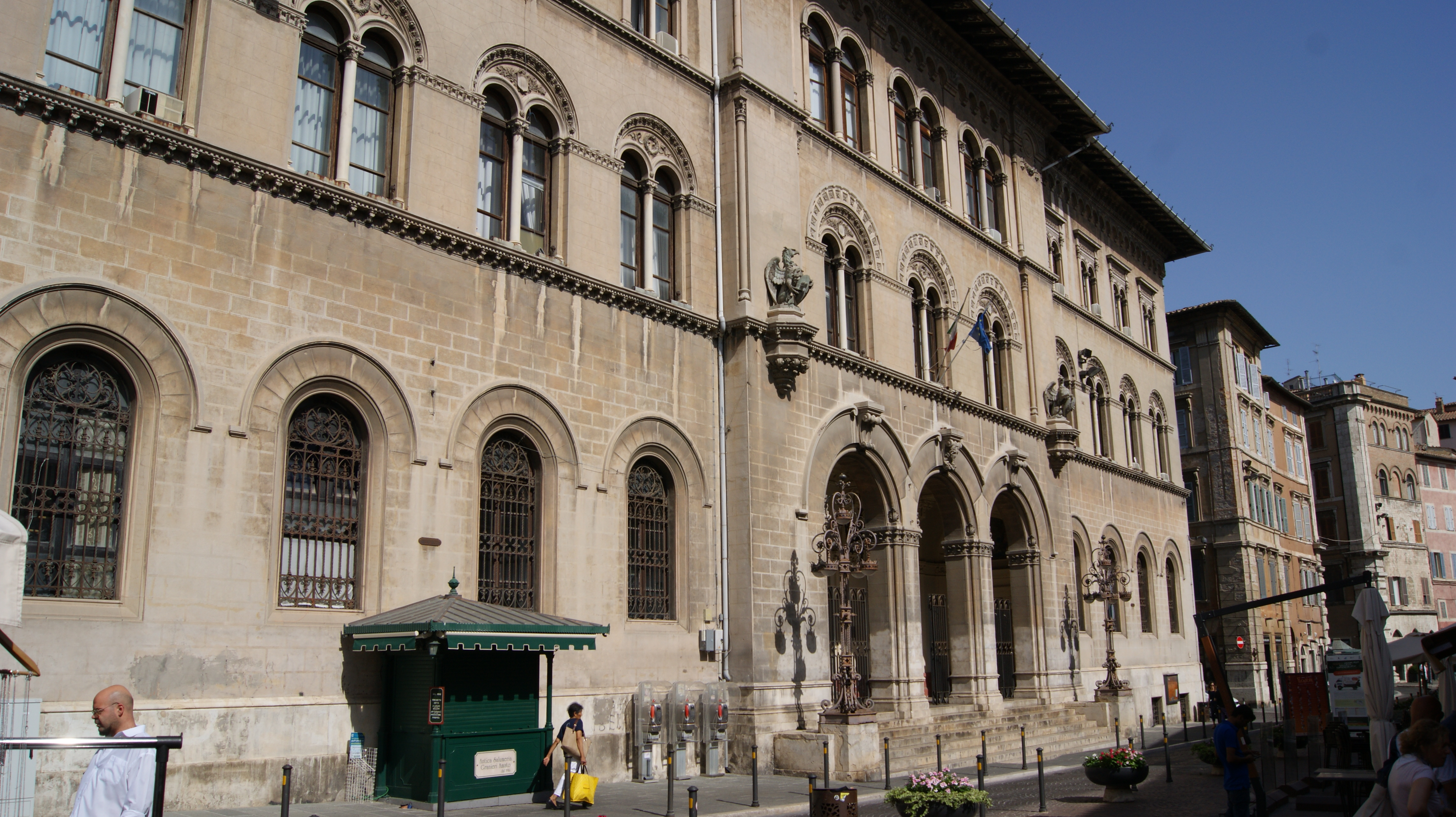
Tribunale's seat in Perugia

The internal organisation of tribunals is structured in several divisions, each of which hear specific types of claim.

- Tribunale per le imprese (Commercial Court): court specialised in company law, industrial property, public bid contracts and commercial services.
- Sezione fallimentare (Bankruptcy Court): court specialised in bankruptcy law and ensuing issues.
- Giudice del Lavoro (Labour Court): court specialised in labour disputes, including lawsuits among employees and employers, social security, labour matters; this courts sit in a single-judge panel.
- Sezione specializzata agraria (Land Estate Court): court specialised in agrarian controversies; cases brought before this court are settled by a panel of three professional judges and two honorary judges, selected among agronomists associated with the relevant professional association.
- Tribunale per i minorenni (Juvenile Court): court specialised in civil and criminal cases in which minors are involved, such as adoptions, emancipations and felonies committed by a minor; it is presided by two professional judges and two expert honorary judges such as psychologists or pedagogists.

====== Corte d'appello ======
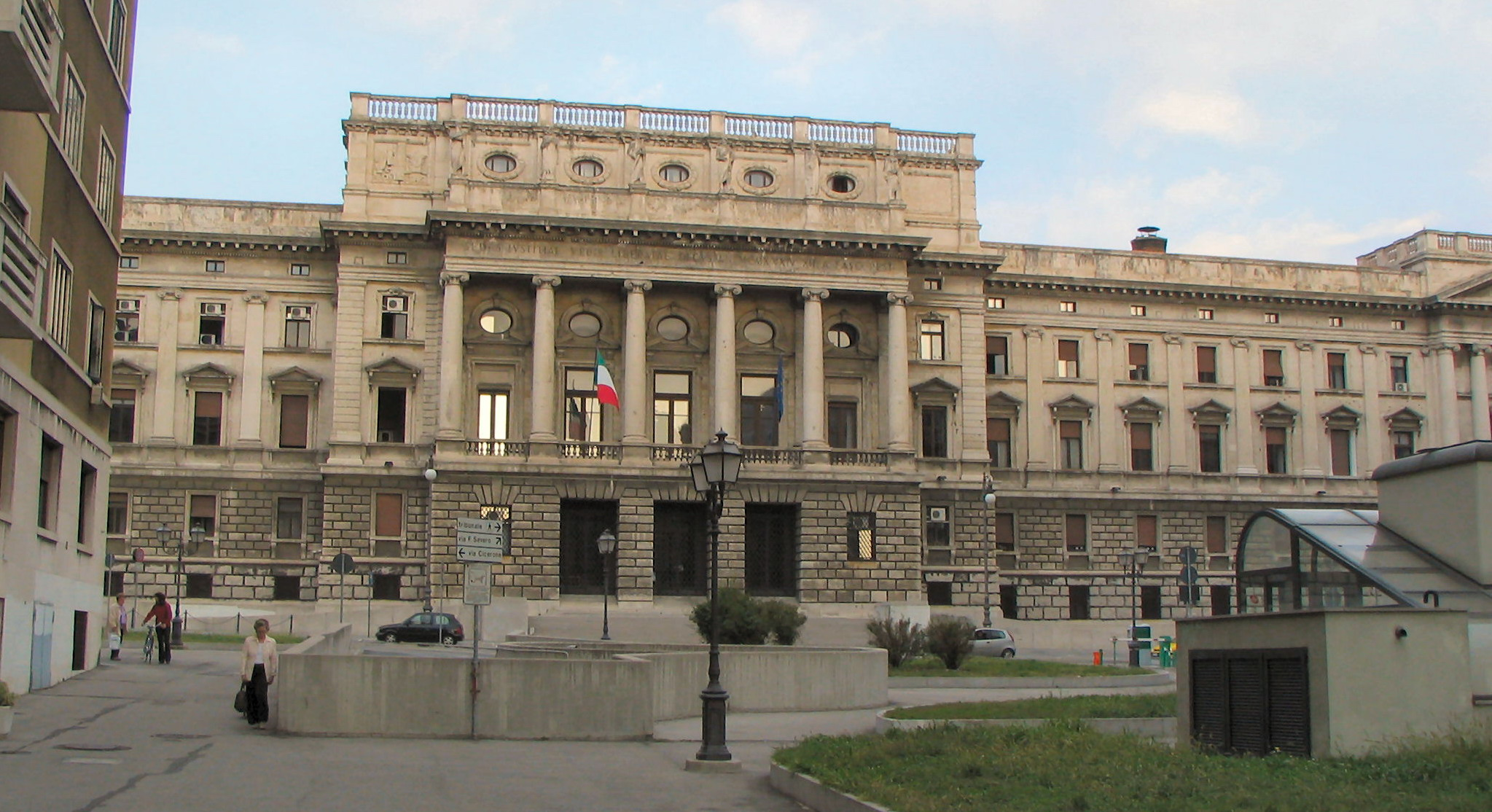
Tribunale's seat in Trieste

The Corte d'appello (Court of Appeal) has jurisdiction to hear cases on appeal from tribunals. Courts of appeal in Italy are competent to retry cases and reassess the legal analysis made in the first instance, limited to the issues raised by the parties in the appeal. Typically, each Corte d'appello is divided into at least three specialised sections: one for civil affairs, another for labour cases, and a third for criminal matters. This division ensures that cases are reviewed by judges with expertise in the relevant legal domain. The jurisdiction of the Corte d'appello is geographically defined, covering cases from tribunals located within its designated district. This territorial demarcation is a key aspect of its operational scope. Decisions made by the Corte d'appello can be further appealed to the Corte Suprema di Cassazione, or Supreme Court of Cassation. This court represents the highest level of appeal in the Italian legal system and its judgments are final.

===== Criminal matters =====
====== Tribunale ======
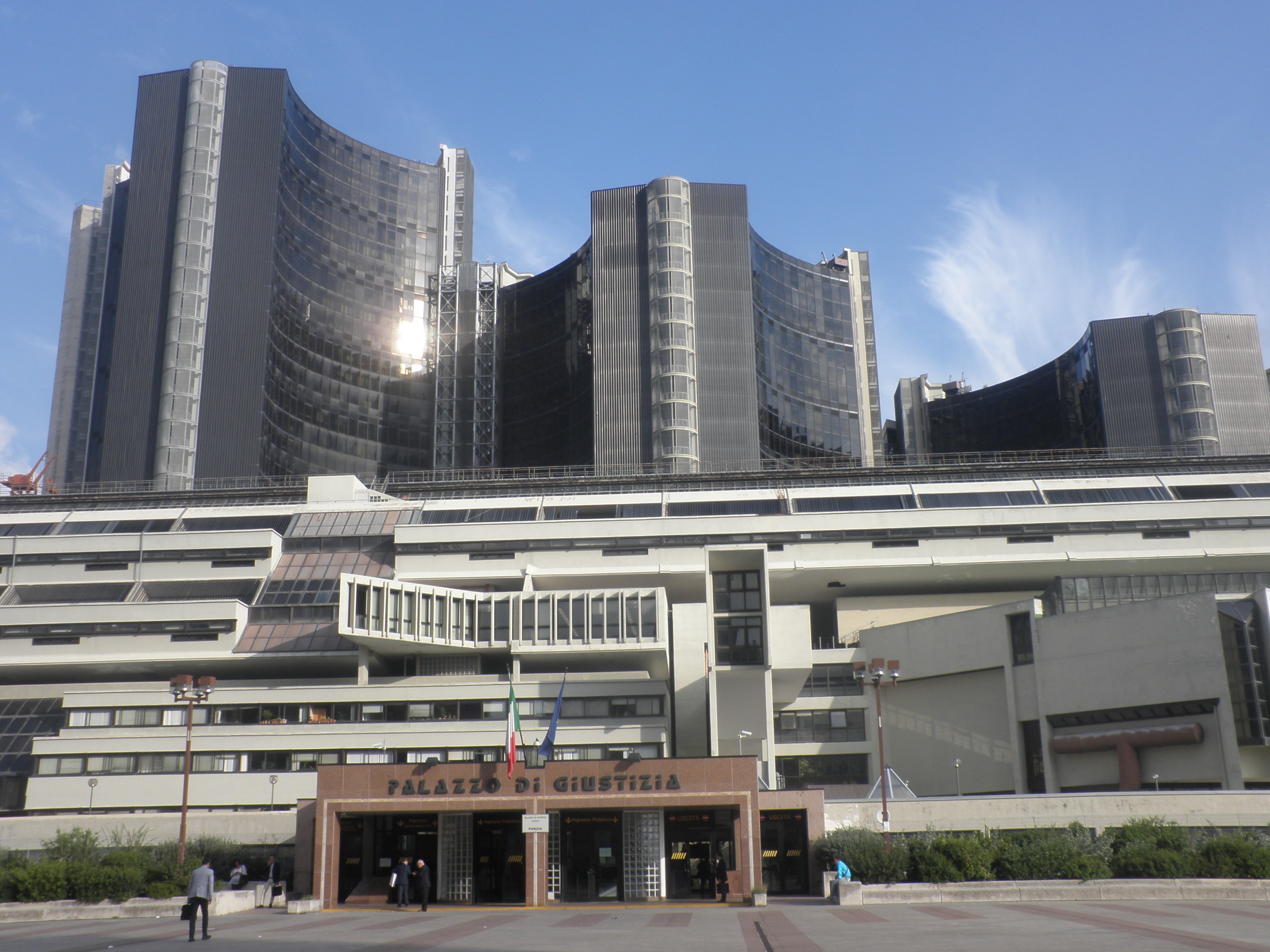
Tribunale's seat in Naples

Tribunals possess general jurisdiction over felonies and misdemeanors punished by law with a criminal fine and/or an imprisonment term of less than 24 years.

====== Corte d'Assise ======
The Corte d'Assise (Court of Assize) is the competent court to try felonies punished with at least 24 years of imprisonment term. The maximum penalty allowed under Italian law is life in prison (ergastolo). These courts are composed of two professional judges and eight lay judge, each of whom casts a parity vote to determine whether the defendant is guilt or innocent. Among the crimes tried by a Corte d'Assise are acts of terrorism, slavery, murder, consensual homicide. Before the Constitutional Court's decision in Massimo Cappato v. The Italian People (Constitutional Court 242/2019), which decriminalised assisted suicide under certain conditions, Italian courts of assizes also handled cases involving this form of conduct, such as aiding someone to undergo euthanasia in a border country where the practice is lawful (e.g., Switzerland).

====== Corte d'assise d'appello ======
The Corte d'assise d'appello (Court of Assize of Appeal) adjudicates appeals against rulings issued in the first instance by a Corte d'assise; its jurisdiction includes appeals against summary judgment delivered by judge of the preliminary hearing on crimes normally devolved to courts of assize. The Court of Assize of Appeal composition reflect that in the first instance for courts of assize, namely, two professional judges and eight lay judges.

====== Tribunale di sorveglianza ======
The Tribunale di sorveglianza (Probation Court) is specially mandated to address requests by convicts, held in an Italian prison, who seek to serve sentence in alternative facilities or under other conditions than detention. In this court, which acts as both a trial and appellate organ, cases are presided by two ordinary probation magistrates specially designated within the district of a Court of appeal and two experts appointed by the High Council of the Judiciary. One Tribunale di sorveglianza sits per district of the Court of Appeal. Rulings issued by a Tribunale di sorveglianza can only be appealed before the Corte Suprema di Cassazione.

===== Corte Suprema di Cassazione =====
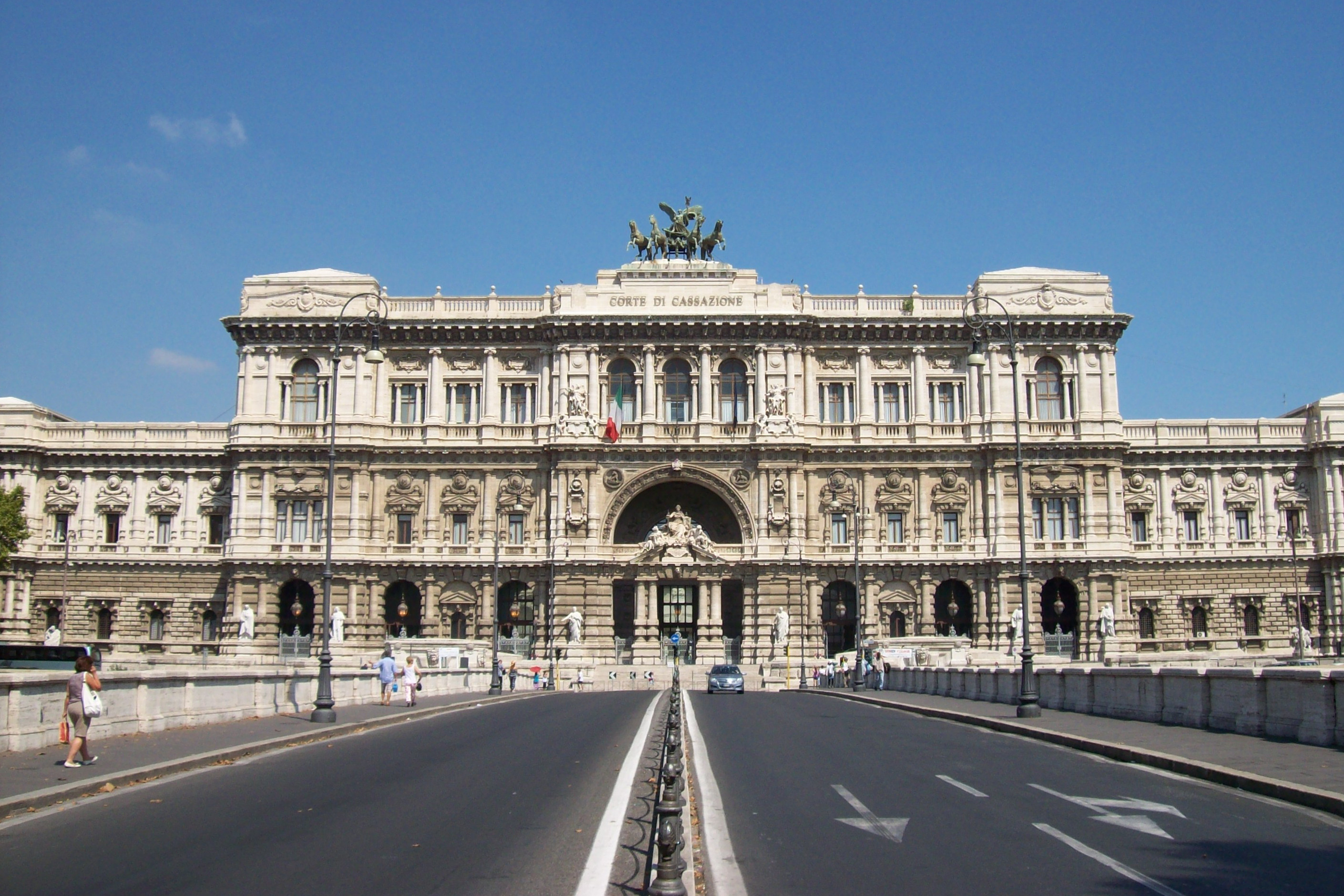
Palace of Justice, Rome, seat of the Supreme Court of Cassation

The Corte Suprema di Cassazione (Supreme Court of Cassation), commonly referred to as the Corte di cassazione, represents the pinnacle of the appellate system in Italy, functioning as the court of last resort. Located in the historic Palace of Justice in Rome, this court stands as the final arbiter in civil and criminal disputes. Beyond its role as the highest appellate authority, the Corte Suprema di Cassazione plays a crucial role in maintaining judicial consistency. It is tasked with ensuring the uniform application of law across the country's legal system ("nomophylactic function"), including in inferior and appellate courts. This encompasses a review not only of the judicial decisions themselves but also the methods and principles applied in reaching these decisions. Appeals before this court may only be raised for matter pertaining to the interpretation and application of the law, exclusive of issues related to facts. Additionally, the Corte di cassazione holds the unique responsibility of resolving jurisdictional disputes among lower courts. This includes determining which court, be it penal, civil, administrative, or military, is appropriately vested with the authority to hear a specific case. This function is vital in preventing jurisdictional overlap and confusion, thus upholding the efficiency and integrity of the legal process. As the apex of the Italian judicial hierarchy, the Supreme Court of Cassation's decisions set persuasive legal precedents, contributing significantly to the development and interpretation of Italian law.

==== Prosecution ====
Public prosecution is organised within public offices constituted before each tribunal, court of appeal and the Court of cassation. Each office, known as Procura della Repubblica, is managed by a Prosecutor of the Republic (procuratore della Repubblica), supported by assistant prosecutors (sostituto procuratore).

===== Procura della Repubblica (before Tribunals) =====
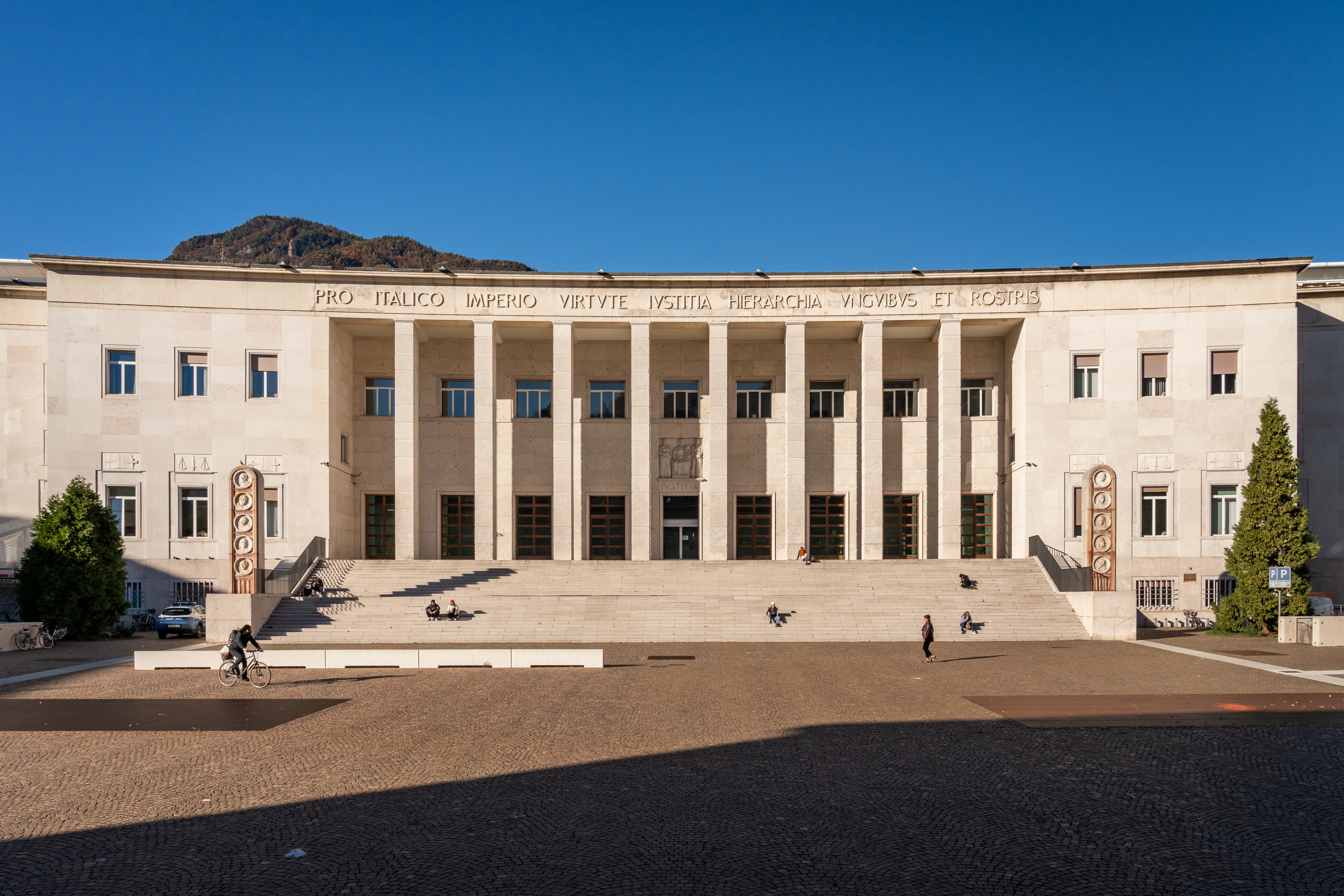
Tribunale's seat in Bolzano

The Procura della Repubblica presso il Tribunale is organised within each tribunal and is responsible for overseeing criminal investigations and initiating prosecutions. Public prosecutors in these offices ensure that criminal proceedings are carried out in accordance with the law. They play a key role in gathering evidence, filing charges, and representing the public interest in courts of first instance. These offices operate under the constitutional principle of independence, ensuring that public prosecutors can perform their duties without external influence.

===== Procura generale della Repubblica (before Courts of appeal) =====
The Procura generale della Repubblica is situated within each court of appeal and handles the prosecution of cases that are appealed from the tribunals. Public prosecutors in these offices handles appeals on rulings made in the first instance, thereby contributing to the correct application and interpretation of the law. The General Prosecutor (known as Procuratore Generale, pl. Procuratori Generali) directs the office, and is assisted by Assistant General Prosecutors (sing. Sostituto Procuratore Generale, pl. Sostituti Procuratori Generali). The key function of general prosecution is to provide an essential check within the appellate system, working to maintain consistency and fairness in judicial proceedings. Like their counterparts at the tribunal level, these prosecutors operate independently.

===== Procura generale della Repubblica (before the Court of cassation) =====
The Procura generale della Repubblica presso la Corte Suprema di Cassazione operates within Italy's highest court, focusing on ensuring the uniform interpretation and application of the law. This office handles appeals on legal grounds, excluding issues related to factual disputes. Public prosecutors (procuratori generali) at this level review cases from lower appellate courts, aiming to resolve discrepancies in legal interpretations. They play a crucial role in maintaining the coherence of judicial decisions across the Italian legal system, supporting the Corte Suprema di Cassazione's nomophylactic function.

=== Special judicial circuit ===
==== Administrative circuit ====
===== Tribunale amministrativo regionale =====
The Tribunale Amministrativo Regionale (abbreviated TAR, Regional Administrative Court) is competent to hear disputes involving the exercise of public power by an administration. Within the Italian legal order, natural and legal persons are deemed to have the potential to acquire 'legitimate interests' against the adoption, execution, revocation or annulment of an administrative act. Regional administrative courts are first-instance courts over administrative disputes. The applicable procedural rules are issued from the code of administrative procedure rather than the code of civil procedure.

===== Consiglio di Stato =====
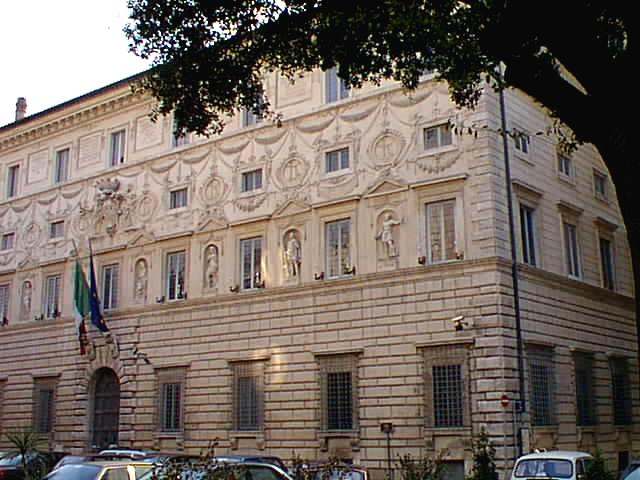
The Council of State's seat in Palazzo Spada, Rome

The Consiglio di Stato is the highest court for administrative matters. It also exerts consultative functions vis-à-vis the Italian government. Magistrates serving within the jurisdictional branch cannot act as government's counselors, in so far as the separation of powers so requires. All magistrates serving within the Consiglio di Stato are owed the title of Consigliere di Stato (Councilor of State), and can occupy either a jurisdictional or auxiliary office. Since the administrative judicial circuit is two-tiered, the Consiglio di Stato exerts jurisdiction in the last resort on appeal from TARs. An appeal before the Suprema Corte di Cassazione is exclusively open as to matters related to jurisdiction.

==== Audit circuit ====
===== Corte dei Conti =====
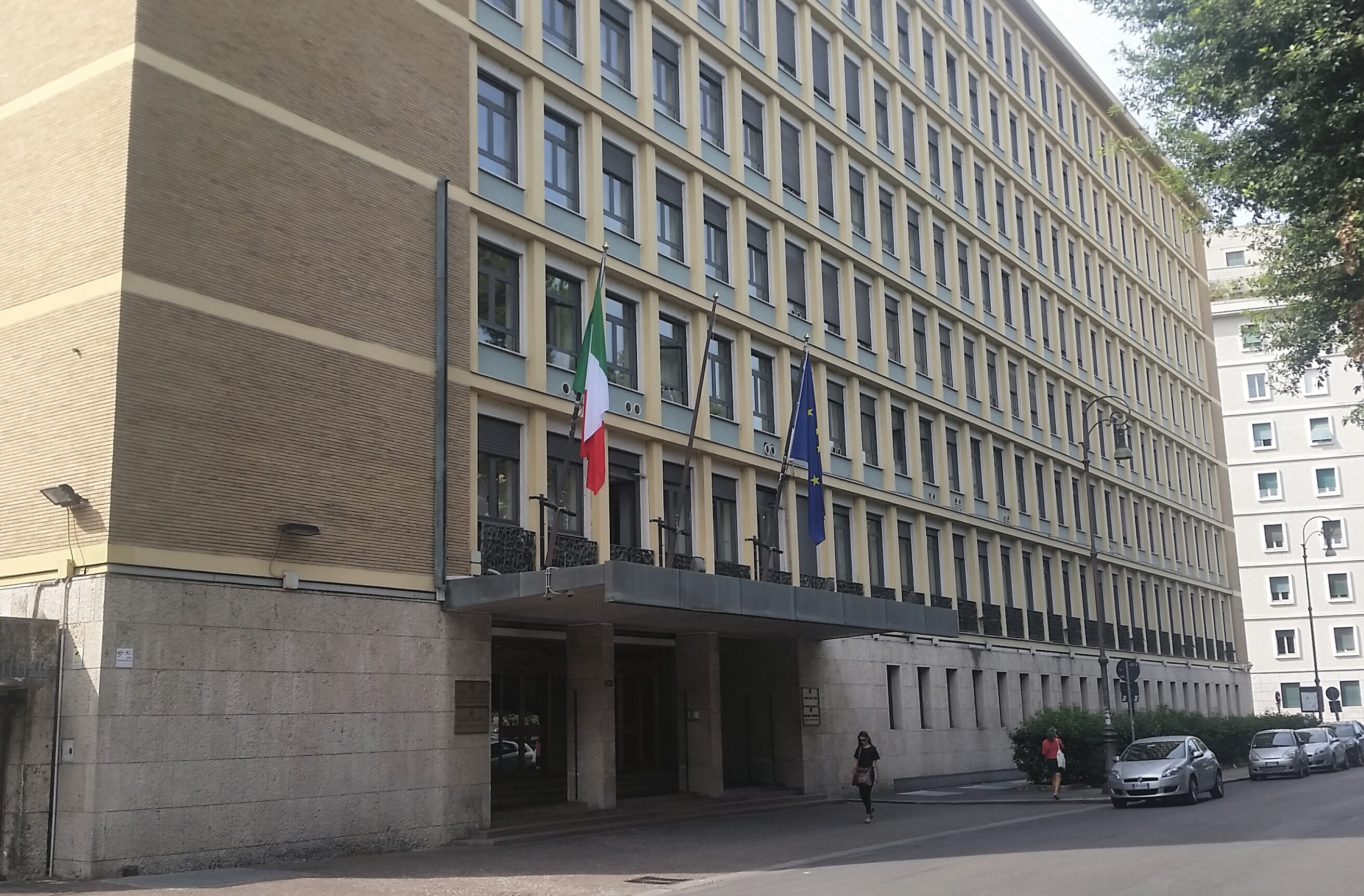
Headquarters of the Corte dei Conti in Rome

The Corte dei Conti (Court of Auditors) is entrusted with reviewing public expenditure. Its jurisdictional attributions encompass both audit and fiscal functions, with a view of ensuring the proper use of public funds and adherence by public entities to financial regulations. Functionally, the Corte dei Conti exercises its jurisdictional role through several key activities. It audits the management of public finances by central and local government agencies, public institutions, and entities receiving public funding. The Court assesses whether financial management and operations comply with established laws and principles of economic efficiency, effectiveness, and economy.

One of the Court's primary statutory functions is to prevent and sanction economic damage to the public administration. This includes holding public officials and entities accountable for mismanagement or misuse of public funds through its prosecutorial powers. The Court can impose administrative sanctions and, in some cases, order the recovery of sums improperly spent or lost due to negligence or misconduct. Moreover, the Corte dei Conti plays a critical role in overseeing public contracts and works, ensuring transparency, fairness, and legal compliance in public procurement processes. This oversight extends to the evaluation of public investments and projects, assessing their coherence with budgetary constraints and public finance objectives. The Court also has an advisory role, providing opinions on legal and regulatory measures affecting public finances upon request by government authorities. This function is aimed at ensuring that proposed laws and regulations adhere to principles of sound financial management and fiscal sustainability.

==== Tax circuit ====
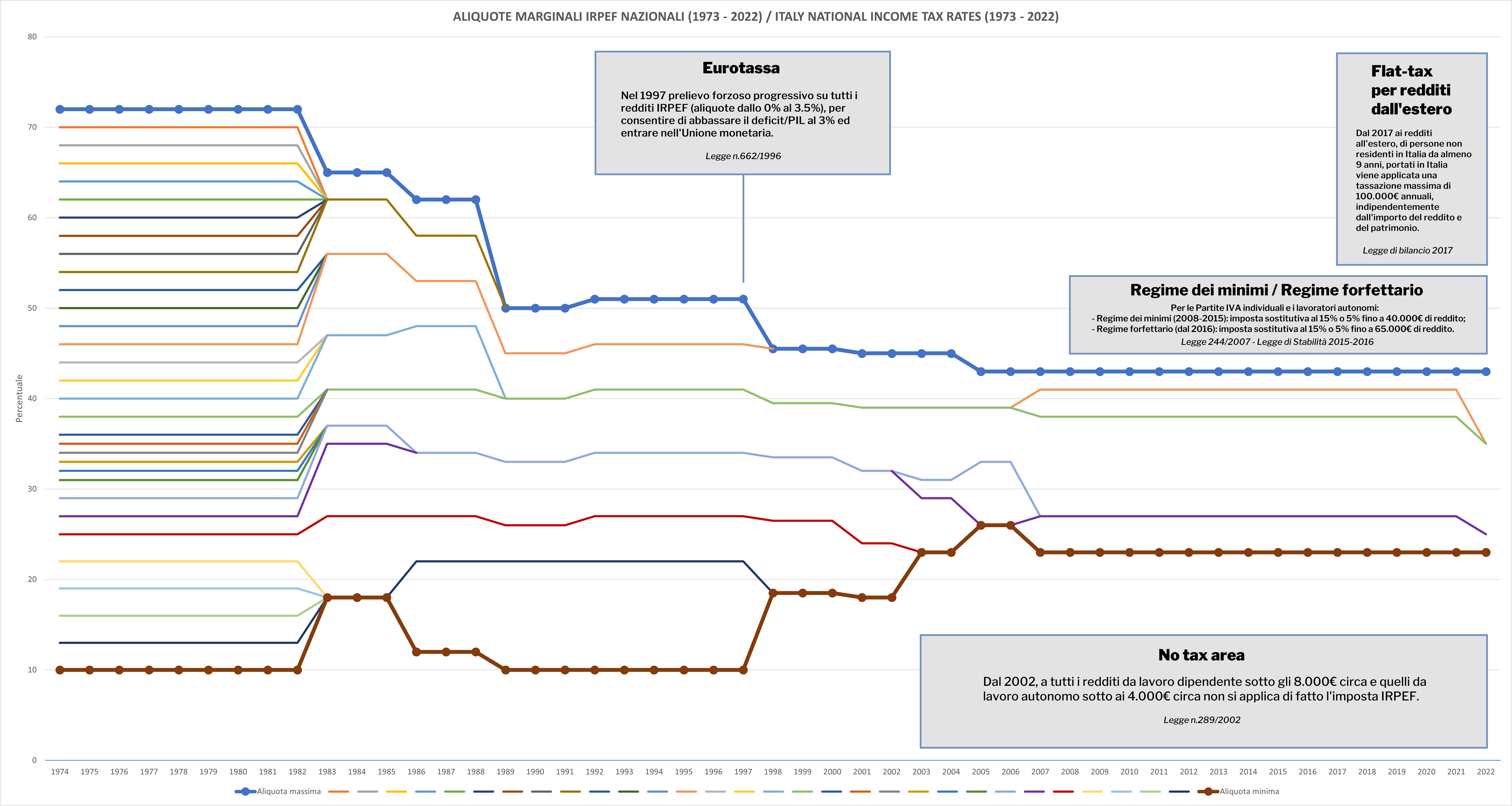
IRPEF tax from 1974 to 2022, with the temporal evolution of the rates and the various exceptions that have occurred at a national level over the years

The current procedural framework of tax justice is laid down by ordinary law no. 130 of 31 August 2022. Previously characterised by jurisdictional commissions at the local and regional levels, the current jurisdictional structure underlies tax courts of first and second instances to handle trial and appellate litigation. The Corte suprema di cassazione possesses a specific competence to rule on points in law.

===== Corte di giustizia tributaria di primo grado (trial) =====
The Corte di giustizia tributaria di primo grado (Trial Tax Court) is a judicial body in Italy that holds jurisdiction over tax-related disputes whenever a taxpayer intends to challenge a decision undertaken by the tax administration. Its primary function is to resolve controversies regarding the application of tax laws, including but not limited to income tax, corporate tax, VAT (Value Added Tax), and other local taxes and duties. This court is composed of judicial panels. Cases worth less than EUR 3,000 are handled by a single judge, whereas other cases are assigned by a three-judge panel consisting of a president and two members. The Corte di giustizia tributaria di primo grado's jurisdiction extends to the examination of factual and legal issues raised by litigants. This competence includes interpreting the scope and application of tax laws, assessing the legality of tax assessments and penalties imposed by the tax authorities, and determining the correctness of tax returns filed by taxpayers.

===== Corte di giustizia tributaria di secondo grado (appellate) =====
The Corte di giustizia tributaria di secondo grado (Appellate Tax Court) hears appellate litigation on rulings issued by first-instance tax courts. The jurisdictional role of the Corte di giustizia tributaria di secondo grado is fundamentally that of an appellate court. When taxpayers or the tax authority contest the ruling issued by a Trial Tax Court, an appeal may be filed in the competent Appellate Tax Court.

===== Corte Suprema di Cassazione =====
The Corte Suprema di Cassazione, as Italy's highest court of appeal, plays a pivotal role in tax dispute resolution. Its jurisdiction extends to ensuring the correct application and interpretation of tax laws, serving as the final arbiter in cases that have progressed through lower courts. Specifically, the court addresses issues of legal significance, including the conformity of tax assessments and rulings with established legal principles. It does not re-examine factual evidence but focuses on legal errors that may have occurred in the interpretation of tax laws by lower courts. This ensures uniformity and consistency in the application of tax laws across Italy, providing a layer of legal certainty and predictability in tax matters.

== Personnel ==
=== Components ===
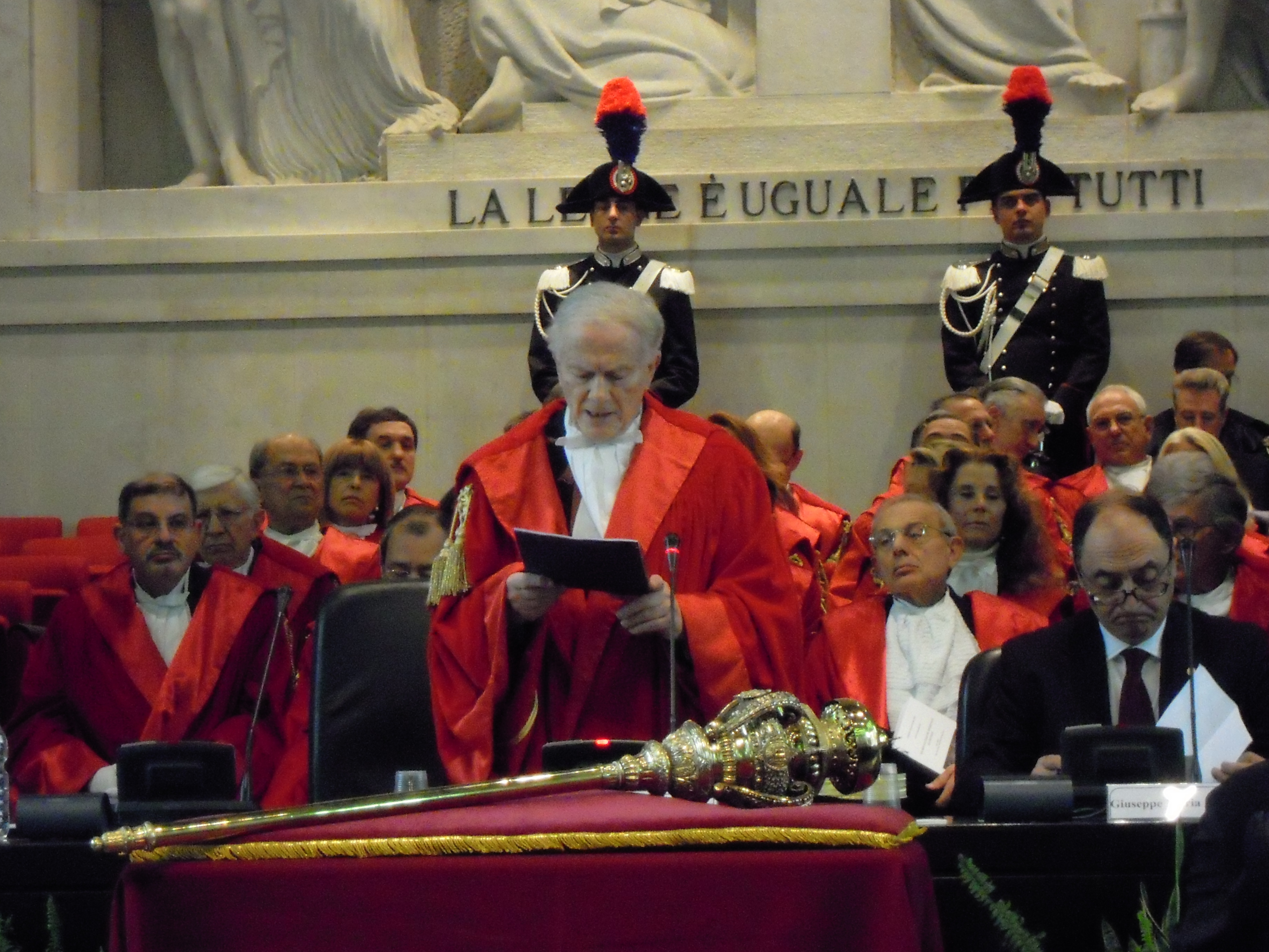
Ruggero Pesce, President of the Milan Court of Appeal, officially opens the judicial year 2010.

Career magistrates, also known as togates (togati, namely, those who wear a toga), can serve in one of the following public offices:

- ordinary court magistrate, who can serve as:
  - public prosecutor; or,
  - bench judge;
- administrative court magistrate, whose competence comprises the protection of legitimate interests against the public administration and specific matters arising out of the exercise of legal rights;
- audit court magistrates assigned to the Court of Audit, with competence to assess and ascertain matters related to the public expenditure, let alone sanction those who have misused public funds; these magistrate can carry the duties of:
  - public prosecutor; or,
  - bench judge.
- tax court magistrate with jurisdiction over tax-related disputes.

The Italian judiciary is also made up of honorary magistrates, who support career magistrates in handling the workload that stems from lesser significant disputes. Litigation in Italy is known to bring about significant delays prior one can obtain a ruling, that is the Italian torpedo. Honorary magistrates can either be assigned to a Court of Peace (giudice di pace) for civil matters to an honorary deputy public prosecutor office or to an honorary court for criminal matters. The adjective "honorary" is intended to confirm the non-professional nature of the duties carried out by these magistrates, who are remunerated according to the number of cases adjudged rather than on a fixed basis. The Italian military judiciary exists on a stand-alone basis, with exclusive competence to judge crimes committed by members of the Italian Armed Forces.

=== Recruitment ===
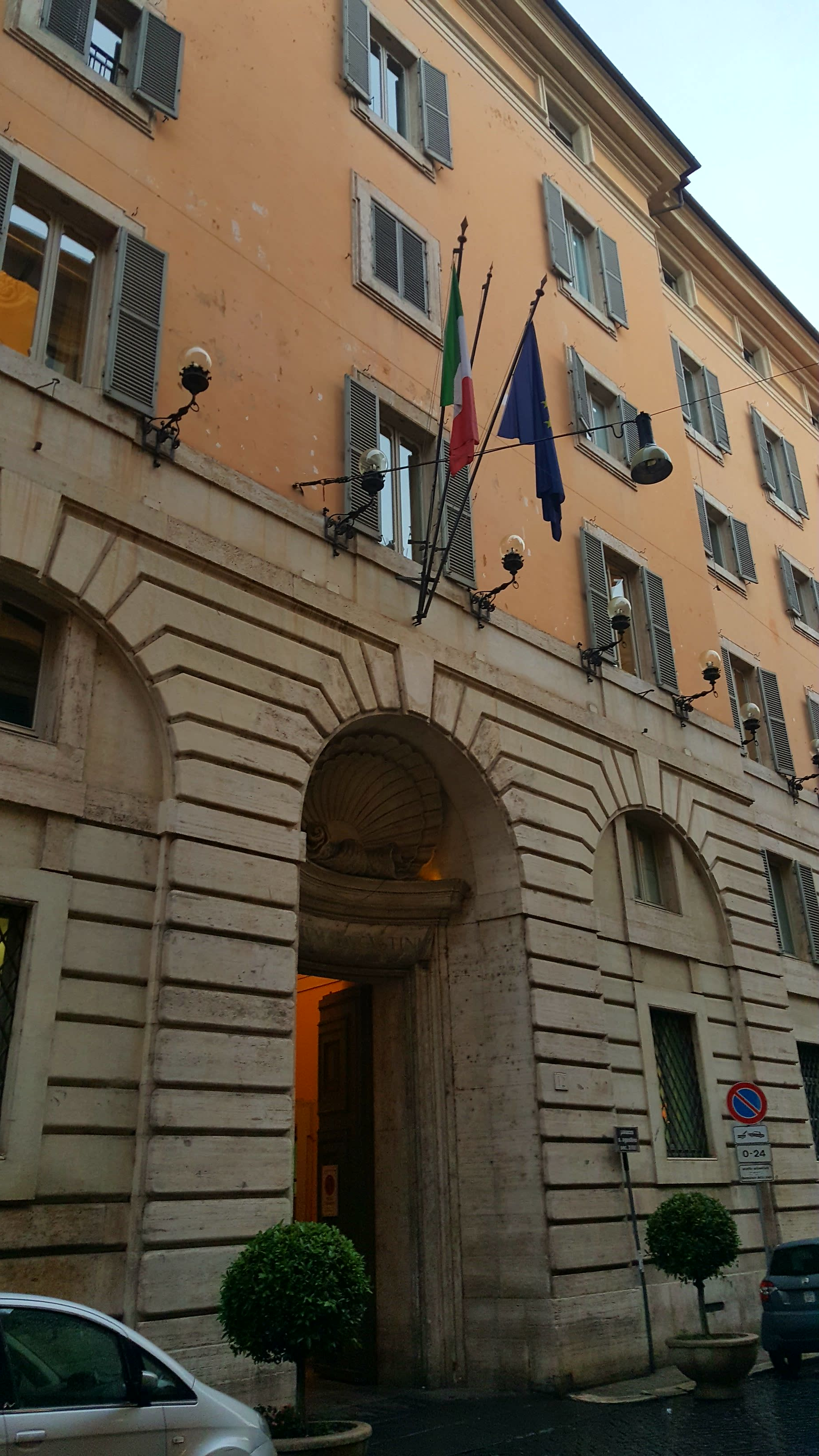
Headquarters of the main State Attorney office, located in Rome

The office of magistrate is not elective. Individuals satisfying the eligibility requirements must sit to a public examination administered by the Ministry of justice, bearing in mind that access to the ordinary, administrative, tax or audit magistracy is differentiated. In fact, candidates with no prior legal experience may solely become ordinary or tax magistrates by undertaking the relevant public examination, whereas access to the administrative and audit magistracies relies on distinct public examinations open to candidates with prior professional or academic experience.

==== Ordinary magistracy ====
Access to the ordinary magistracy is based on a competitive public examination, held roughly each year by the Ministry of Justice. Among the many eligibility requirements, candidates must hold an Italian Juris Doctor (the laurea magistrale a ciclo unico in giurisprudenza) and Italian citizenship at the time of signing up. For several decades, entry to this examination was subjected to candidates possessing prior relevant professional or academic experience. Civil servants and lawyers with a five-year experience in the position were eligible to sit to the examination, just as honorary magistrates with a six-year experience. The entry requirement was also met by doctors of law, university lecturers in legal matters, graduates from the Italian Schools of Specialization for the Legal Professions or law graduates who clerked with a civil or criminal magistrate for eighteen months. Furthermore, administrative and audit magistrates as well as state attorneys [it] were and continue being eligible to the examination.

In 2022, a reform of the judicial organisation has been undertaken to simplify the recruitment of ordinary magistrates, bringing down the main entry requirement to possession of an Italian Juris Doctor. The exam is divided in two phases. The first part is written and requires candidates to draft three dissertations in private law, criminal law and administrative law respectively, each eight-hour long. The second part, an oral examination, is accessed by candidates who received at least the pass mark (12/20) in each written composition; an examination jury conducts an oral interview of candidates on ten legal subject-matters plus a foreign language test among English, French, Spanish or German. At the end of examination, laureates may acquire the status of ordinary trainee magistrate (magistrato ordinario in tirocinio). A candidate can undertake the entry examination only thrice in their life.

==== Administrative magistracy ====
Access to the judicial branch's administrative division is contingent upon passing two distinct public competitive exams, which are open only to certain legal professionals and academics who hold specific qualifications. To qualify for TARs (Administrative Regional Tribunals), candidates must be either ordinary, audit, or military magistrates, state attorneys, law professors or lecturers with at least five years of experience, public officials, or regional, provincial, or local elected officials in possess of a Juris Doctor. Additionally, lawyers with a minimum of eight years of legal practice are considered eligible. A different and more rigorous examination is required to enter into the Councilor of State's office. This particular exam is open to administrative magistrates with at least a one-year experience, and ordinary, audit, or military magistrates with a minimum of four years of experience in office. Moreover, senior officials in the Senate of the Republic or the Chamber of Deputies, as well as high-ranking public servants, are eligible to take this exam if they hold a law degree.

==== Audit magistracy ====
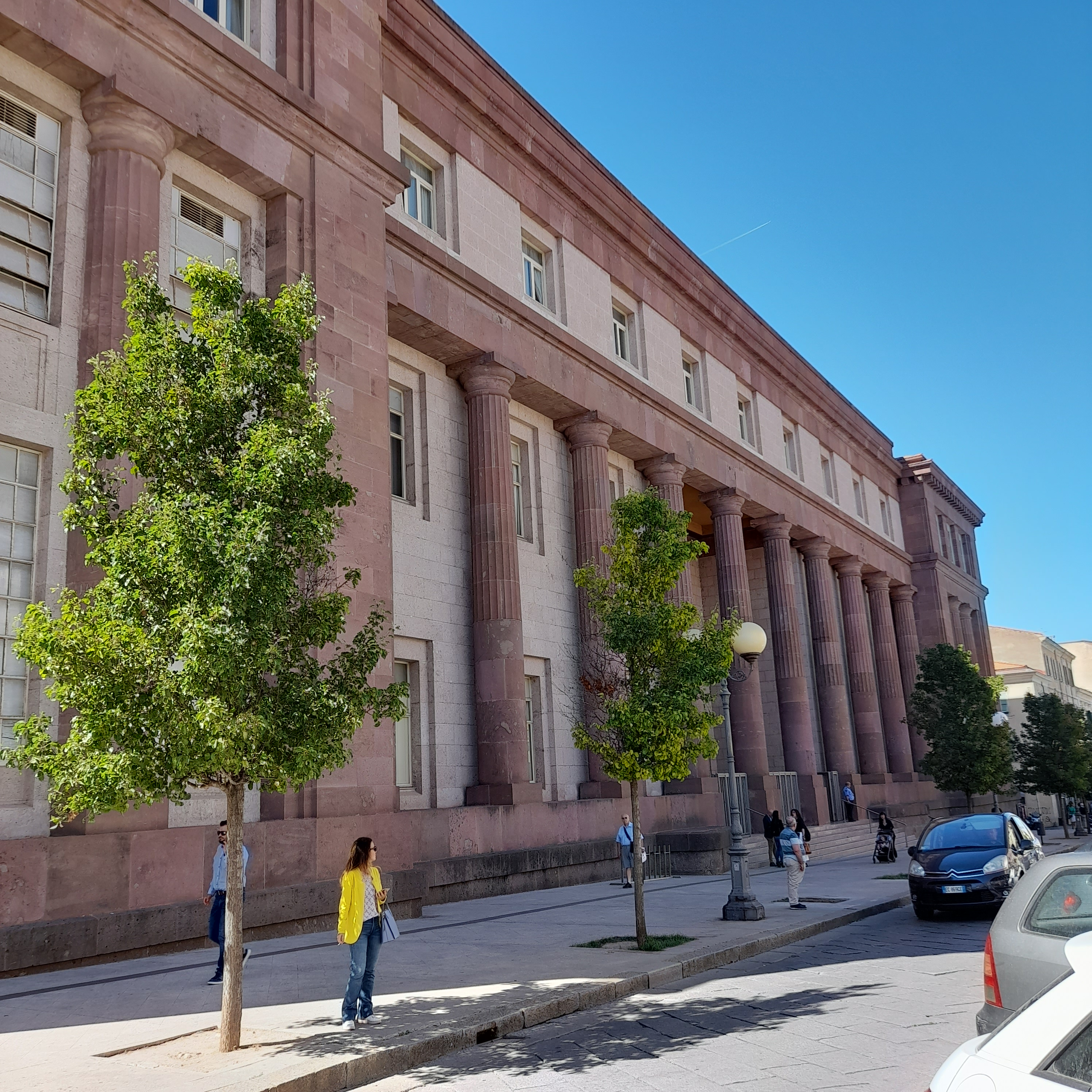
Tribunale's seat in Sassari

Access to the audit magistracy in Italy is contingent on passing a public competitive examination organised by the Court of Auditors, typically held approximately every year and a half. Many different professionals may sit to the examination, including judges, state attorneys, military and administrative magistrates, lawyers with a minimum of five years in the bar, and certain public administration employees in possession of an Italian law degree and professional experience. University law professors and researchers in legal subjects with at least three years of service are also eligible. Additionally, cumulative service in different eligible categories can meet seniority requirements.

==== Tax magistracy ====
The entry into the Italian Tax Magistracy is also determined through a competitive examination process. Candidates eligible for this examination must possess an Italian Juris Doctor or a master's degree in Economics or Business Economics, hold Italian citizenship, have full civil rights, and maintain unblemished conduct. Additionally, they must not have been declared unsuitable three times in previous tax magistrate competitions. The examination consists of a preliminary test, a written exam, and an oral exam. The written exam is open to a number of candidates that is three times the number of available positions. This stage involves drafting two essays on selected topics, with candidates needing to score at least 18 out of 30 on each to advance. The subjects for the written tests include civil law, tax law, and the drafting of a tax court decision. The oral exam covers a broad range of topics, including tax and procedural tax law, civil and procedural civil law, criminal tax law, constitutional and administrative law, commercial law, EU law, accounting, legal informatics, and a foreign language chosen by the candidate. To pass, candidates must achieve a minimum score of 6 out of 10 in each oral exam subject and an overall score of at least 90 points across both the written and oral examinations.

=== Professional training and development ===
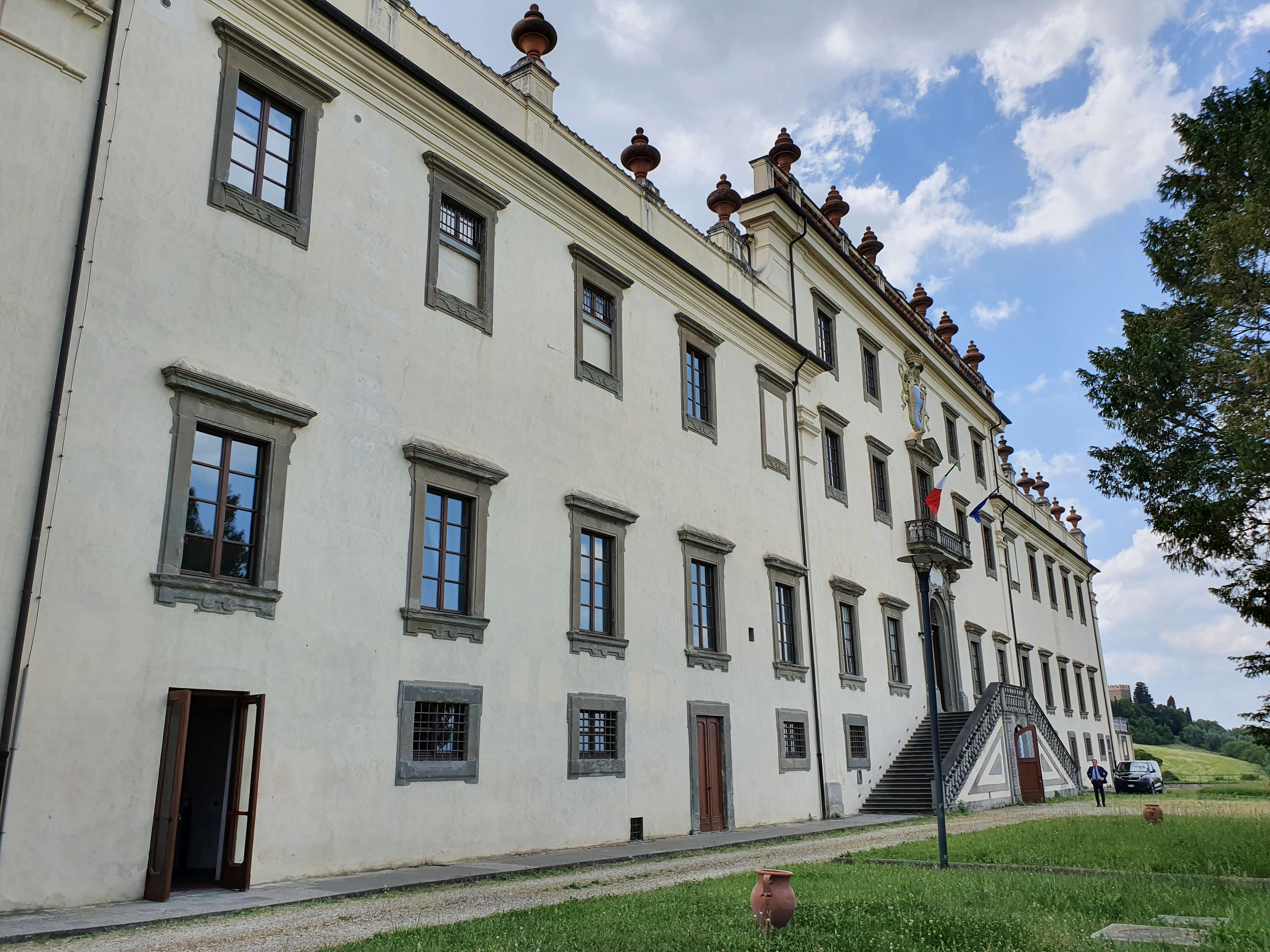
Villa Castel Pulci (Scandicci), seat of the Higher School of the Judiciary

==== Ordinary magistracy ====
Ordinary magistrates must undergo an initial training upon successfully sitting to the competitive examination, then continue the training via a "lifelong learning program".

===== Initial training =====
Ordinary trainee magistrates undergo an initial training within the Scuola superiore della magistratura, with operational offices in Scandicci and Naples. The school was set up in 2012 with the aim to provide for an education program to trainee magistrates akin to the French national school of magistracy. From 1994 throughout 2012, Commission IX of Consiglio superiore della magistratura was responsible to design and implement the curriculum. Before 1994, trainee magistrates followed a limited number of academic courses as the learning program mainly consisted in shadowing a more experienced magistrate. The initial training program consists of a first six-month period of academic and professional courses administered by the Scuola superiore della magistratura, then followed by a twelve-month period within a judicial office where the trainee magistrate is supervised by a career magistrate.

===== Professional training =====
Upon entering into office, career ordinary magistrates are required stay abreast of the legal landscape, hence, they pursue another form of training until the reach an advanced professional evaluation. This program is designed under the form of seminars and conferences, so that magistrates must follow a pre-set number of courses of their choice per year. As from autumn 2012, another Scuola superiore della magistratura's prerogative is to prepare and organise these conferences and seminars.

==== Tax magistracy ====
Upon successfully passing the competitive examination, appointed tax magistrates undergo a training internship lasting at least six months at tax justice courts. During this training period, they participate in the judicial activities related to disputes within their jurisdiction, working in a collegial composition.

==== International training ====
Italy's membership to Eurojust and the European Judicial Training Network fosters the participation of Italian magistrates to transnational training and professional programs as well as exchanges, also in the context of EU judicial cooperation.

== Ministry of Justice ==
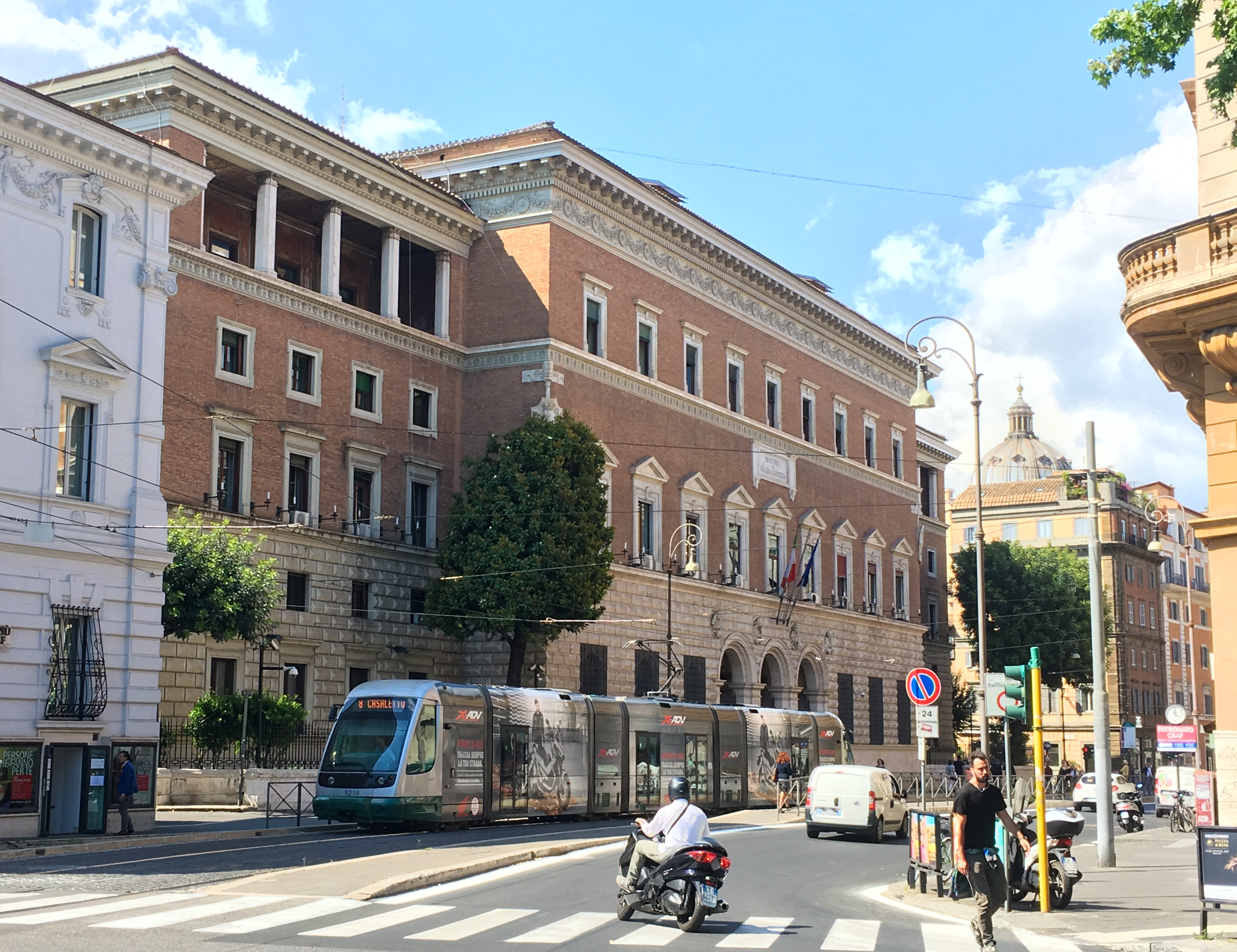
Headquarters of the Italian Ministry of Justice, Rome

The Italian Ministry of Justice is central to the administration and efficient functioning of the judiciary system, tasked with managing the logistical and administrative needs of courts. This includes not only the disbursement of salaries to judicial staff but also the development and maintenance of courthouse infrastructure, ensuring that the physical spaces where justice is served are conducive to fairness and efficiency.

Whilst the separation of powers prevents any interference on the exercise of judicial functions by magistrates, including public prosecutors, the Ministry of justice holds the initiative to commence disciplinary proceedings against a magistrate. It also processes applications for presidential pardons, verifying file compliance with the minimum terms set by law, coordinating involved stakeholders and managing the timetable.

The Ministry's other responsibilities extend to collaboration with other governmental bodies, such as the Ministry of Infrastructure and Transport, with which it shares the financial burden of constructing and renovating courthouses. Likewise, the prison system is administered in coordination with the Ministry of the Interior to ensure execution of sentences and rehabilitation of individuals post-sentencing. Proactive involvement in the legislative process underscores another prerogative of the Ministry. By proposing new laws and amendments in areas of civil and criminal justice, the Ministry's of justice legislative office is directly involved in the organisation of the justice system in Italy, the status of magistrates and, ultimately, the legislative process.

== Police forces ==
=== Polizia Penitenziaria ===
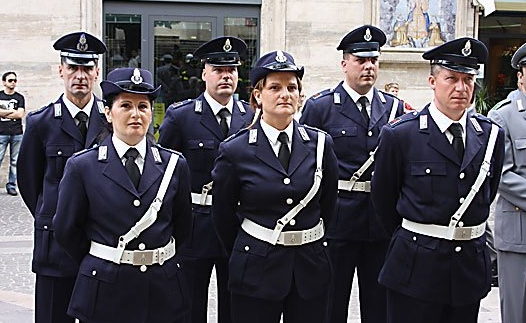
Polizia Penitenziaria's officers

The Polizia Penitenziaria (Penitentiary Police) is a law enforcement agency in Italy, operating under the Ministry of justice's jurisdiction, with its primary function centered around the management and operation of the Italian prison system. This includes overseeing prison security, ensuring the safety of inmates, and managing their transportation. Unique to its functioning, the Vatican City, albeit an independent state, relies on the Italian prison system to detain and manage convicted individuals due to the absence of a penal institution within its small territory, as per Article 22 of the Lateran Pacts (Patti Lateranensi).

This agency is also tasked with duties that extend to functions traditionally associated with the judicial police, public safety, and traffic control, providing support to other national police forces through activities such as traffic roadblocks, known locally as controllo. The Polizia Penitenziaria forms one of the four pillars of the national police forces in Italy, alongside the Carabinieri, the Polizia di Stato and the Guardia di Finanza each bestowed with distinct responsibilities and operational domains.

=== Polizia Giudiziaria ===
The Polizia Giudiziaria, or judicial police, represent another facet of law enforcement within the Italian judiciary, comprising personnel from various police forces and specific officials from the public administration, as designated by law. This entity operates directly under the auspices of the judicial authority under Article 109 of the Constitution of the Italian Republic. The Polizia Giudiziaria's primary responsibility is to gather evidence for prosecutorial purposes, which encompasses a range of activities from arresting and interrogating suspects to conducting witness lineups and interviews.

== See also ==
- Italian law codes
- Law of Italy
