= Constitutional institutions (Italy) =

The constitutional institutions of Italy (Italian: organi costituzionali italiani) are institutions of the Italian Republic which are defined in the constitution.

== Characteristics ==
In Italian jurisprudence, these are defined as the essential and immutable institutions of the State, which are foreseen as existing by the Italian constitution and whose fundamental powers and organisation are directly defined by the constitution. They have a relationship of mutual parity and they take part in the so-called "political process" (funzione politica), that is, they directly determine the goals to be pursued by the state.

Because these institutions are directly defined by the constitution, codification of any of them is a modification of the constitution and therefore requires the passage of a constitutional law. Their very existence, however, constitutes a limit on the modification of the constitution.

== The institutions ==
The constitutional institutions are:

- The President of the Republic
- The Parliament, consisting of the Chamber of Deputies and the Senate of the Republic
- The Council of Ministers
- The Constitutional Court
- The Judiciary
- The autonomous territorial entities, viz. the comuni, provinces, regions, metropolitan cities, and the state of Italy as a whole.

== Expenditure ==
Although all public expenses are included in the national budget, which is drafted by the government and approved by parliament, it is claimed that the constitutional institutions, which the constitution places outside the administrative control of the executive, are self-governing and should have control of their own finances. According to this argument, the budgets of the President, Constitutional Court, and Parliament cannot be reduced without their consent. A minority opinion, emphasising the treatment of the regional councils, have questioned this argument.

Although the President, Constitutional Court and the Parliament have full autonomy in the administration of the resources assigned to them, according to the principle of autocrinia, it is now firmly established that their administrative offices should be composed of employees recruited by public competition, as set down by the constitutional law on public employment. Legal provisions directly dealing with these administrations, governing the behaviour of public employees generally, remain rare. The entire public sector's freedom from the legal and economic regulations of contracts derives from the principle of autodichia, that is, the idea that constitutional institutions should be in charge of their own internal regulation.

== See also ==
- Institutions of constitutional importance (Italy)
- Constitutional body
