= Copyzero =

Method of documenting authorship in Italy

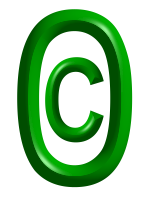
Symbol of copyzero

Copyzero is a mechanism of protection of works by means of a qualified digital signature and a time mark. This mechanism lies in converting the work into digital format and appending the digital signature (which characterizes the author of the work) and a time mark (which indicates the existence of the work since given time) to the file.

In the Italian legal system, the digital signature has the same probative value as a certificate of SIAE (Società Italiana degli Autori ed Editori, Italian society of authors and publishers) but a cost much smaller (0.36 Euro, cost of one time mark, rather than the corresponding 110 euro for renewal of the certificate every 5 years).

The duration of a time mark is 4 years: in order to extend the period of validity it is sufficient to append a new time mark to the marked file before the old time mark expires. However, the expired mark can be rightfully used in a court ruling up to 10 years from the date it was appended.

The instruments used by Copyzero are the device of a qualified digital signature (a smart card obtainable at certification authorities like e.g. the Chamber of Commerce) and the corresponding reader (for sale at computer stores).

== Sources ==
Translation of the Copyzero article at the Italian Wikipedia.
