= Margherita Cassano =

Italian judge (born 1955)

President of the Supreme Court of Cassation of Italy
- In office 6 March 2023 – 8 September 2025
- Preceded by: Pietro Curzio
- Succeeded by: Pasquale D'Ascola

Member of the High Council of the Judiciary of Italy
- In office 1998–2002

Personal details
- Born: 1955 (age 70–71) Florence, Italy

Margherita Cassano (born 1955) is an Italian judge. She served as the first woman president of the Supreme Court of Cassation of Italy between 2023 and 2025, and also served at the High Council of the Judiciary between 1998 and 2002.

== Career ==
Cassano was born in 1955 in Florence, Italy. Her father was judge Pietro Cassano.

She began working in 1980 at the Florence public prosecutor's office, where she worked on trafficking and drug cases and collaborated with Pier Luigi Vigna on investigations into organised crime. Cassano was prosecutor at the Florence Anti-Mafia Directorate between 1981 and 1998. She was subsequently elected a member of the High Council of the Judiciary, where served between 1998 and 2002. In 2003 she began presiding over the first criminal section of the Supreme Court of Cassation of Italy as a judge, and on her return to Florence she presided over the Court of Appeal in 2015.

In July 2020 Cassano became the first woman vicepresident of th Supreme Court of Cassation. On 15 March 2023 the High Council of the Judiciary unanimously elected her the first woman president of the Supreme Court of Cassation, to succeed Pietro Curzio. She was succeeded by Pasquale D'Ascola in September 2025.
