= Francesco Saverio Garofani =

Italian politician (born 1962)

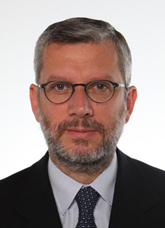
- Garofani in 2013

Member of the Chamber of Deputies
- In office 28 April 2006 – 22 March 2018
- Constituency: Lombardy 3 (2006–2008); Liguria (2008–2013); Lazio 1 (2018–2022)

Personal details
- Born: 29 December 1962 (age 63)
- Party: Democratic Party (since 2007)

Francesco Saverio Garofani (born 29 December 1962) is an Italian politician serving as secretary of the Supreme Council of Defence since 2022. From 2006 to 2018, he was a member of the Chamber of Deputies.
