= Pasquale D'Ascola =

Italian Magistrate, First President of the Supreme Court of Cassation

Pasquale D'Ascola (born 1 April 1958 in Reggio Calabria) is an Italian politician, official, lawyer, and jurist.

He served as a member of the scientific committee for training at the High Council of the Judiciary. On 2025, he was appointed President of the Court of Cassation.

== Legal career ==
He earned a law degree from the University of Messina and subsequently entered the judiciary in 1981, serving first as a magistrate and later as a judge in Verona. In 2001, he began serving in the Office of the Massimario and Docket of the Court of Cassation, a role he held until 2007.

In 2018, he became a Section President, and in 2020, he took charge of the Second Civil Section; in October 2023, he assumed the role of Deputy President of the Court of Cassation, overseeing the coordination of proceedings and presiding over the civil and joint sections.

He has also served as a member of the scientific committee for training at the High Council of the Judiciary and of the decentralized unit of the School for the Judiciary.

On 4 September 2025, he was appointed First President of the Court of Cassation, succeeding Margherita Cassano on 9 September 2025.
