= Supreme Council of Defence (Italy) =

- Consiglio Supremo di Difesa
- Coat of Arms of Italy

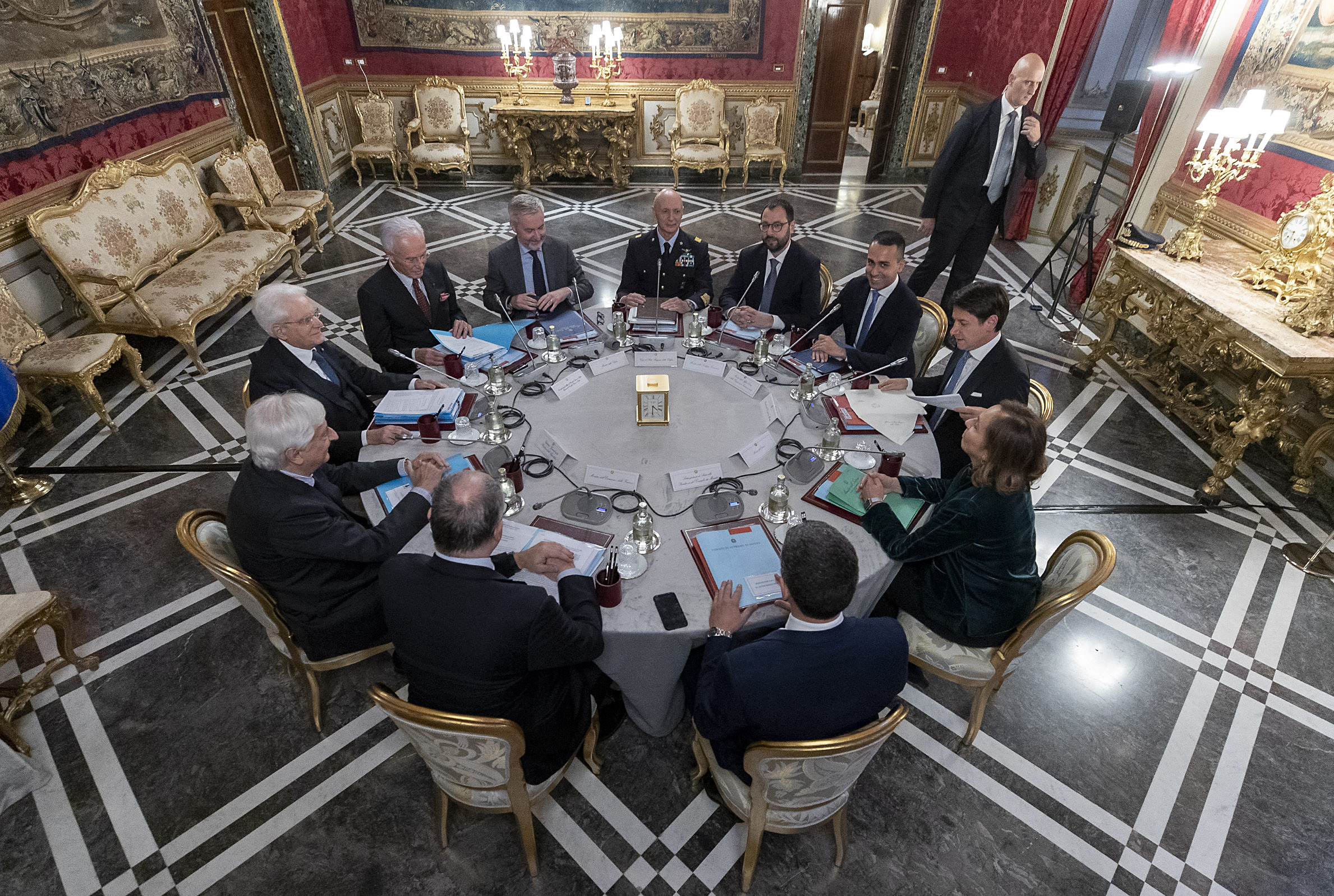
- High Council of Defence in 2019
- Formation: 28 July 1950
- Legal status: Institution of constitutional importance
- Headquarters: Quirinal Palace, Rome
- President: Sergio Mattarella
- Council Vice President: Giorgia Meloni
- Secretary: Francesco Saverio Garofani (since 2022)

The Supreme Council of Defence (Italian: Consiglio Supremo di Difesa) is an Italian institution of constitutional importance which controls the Italian Armed Forces.

== History ==
The Italian Constitutional Convention of 1947, mindful of High Commissions of Defence of the statuary tradition and taking inspiration from the High Council of National Defence of the Fourth French Republic, gave the President of Italy, as Head of State, the role of President of the High Council of Defence, along with several other roles. The Constitution did not state how this council would be organised or what its powers were, leaving this for the Italian Parliament to determine.

The Consiglio Supremo di Difesa was created by Law no. 624 of 28 July 1950, during the Korean War, in light of fear that the conflict might spread to Europe. The ultimate responsibility for political and technical matters of national security was given to its members: the President, the Prime Minister, the Minister of Defence, the Chief of the Defence Staff, as well as the Ministers of the Interior, of Foreign Affairs, of the Treasury, and of Industry and Commerce. The law left several important issues undefined, such as the exact legal nature of the council and its place within the Italian constitutional system. The references in the Constitution are capable of multiple interpretations, as are the law of 1950 and the Presidential Decree no. 251 of 4 August 1990. As a result, most of the internal organisation and powers of the council are regulated de facto rather than de jure.

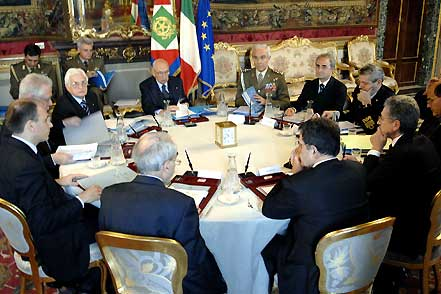
President Giorgio Napolitano chairs the High Council of Defence, 2 April 2007.

The continually changing balance of power between the key institutions of the Italian State (especially between the President and the Prime Minister), along with the lack of published guidelines on the workings and activities of the Consiglio Supremo di Difesa, have prevented its functions from being solidified by any sort of constitutional convention more durable than the tenures of the individual officeholders who have sat on it. When the law of 1950 was passed, President Luigi Einaudi, Prime Minister Alcide De Gasperi, and Defence Minister Randolfo Pacciardi agreed on the role and nature of the council, leaving a record of this in the preamble of the 1951 regulation. But this constitutional convention did not last long and the council that emerged under President Giovanni Gronchi was substantially different from that of the early 1950s.

The council is thus a "chameleontic institution", whose nature is shaped by the various political and institutional contexts which face Italy at any moment: from a collegial institution with specific powers to a mere site of conflict between the President and the Prime Minister, without any autonomy; from an institution which participated in the political process to one with only administrative functions; from an institution with advisory and consultative powers to one with the ability to determine the most important issues of national security and impose its solutions on the government and parliament through the adoption of binding political directives.

== Description ==
The High Council of Defence is chaired by the President of the Republic of Italy and, according to the statement of Law no.624/1950 ("Institution of the High Council of Defence"), it "examines the general political and technical problems related to national defence and determines policies and issues directives for the organisation and the coordination of activities which relate to it in anyway."

It is regulated by the terms of title II of Decree no.66 of 15 March 2010 ("Code of Military Organisation").

=== Organisation ===
The council is chaired by the President of Italy and is composed (as a result of the amalgamation and renaming of various ministerial portfolios) of:

- Prime Minister of Italy, who is the Vice-President of the Council
- Minister of Foreign Affairs
- Minister of Defence
- Minister of the Interior
- Minister of Economy and Finance
- Minister of Economic Development
- Chief of the Defence Staff

The Secretary of the High Council of Defence, appointed by the council itself, is a permanent and autonomous office. Meetings of the Council can be attended by the heads of the four armed forces (Army, Navy, Air Force, and the Carabinieri), the President of the Council of State, and any other individuals with particular scientific, industrial, and economic knowledge or expertise in military problems.

The High Council of Defence meets at least twice a year and is convened by the President, but it can also be convened at the request of the Prime Minister whenever necessary.

=== Powers ===
The council examines general issues relating to national defence on the basis of general directives formulated by the executive and the Parliament and produces directives which are binding on the President, the Council of Ministers (and therefore all the individual ministries) and the leaders of the armed forces.

Its powers are largely defined in negative terms, such that in practice the majority of the practical decision-making powers mentioned in Law no.624/1950 actually belong to other institutions. In particular, those elements of the political process which relate to foreign affairs and military policy belong to the executive, and the Chief of the Defence Staff is responsible for the formulation of strategic plans and the defence of the borders. As a result, the council limited to playing a consultative and advisory role to the Council of Ministers, much like an Inter-ministerial Committee.

== Current members ==
| Image | Name | Role | Since |
|---|---|---|---|
| | Sergio Mattarella | President of the Republic | 3 February 2015 |
| | Giorgia Meloni | President of the Council of Ministers | 22 October 2022 |
| | Antonio Tajani | Minister of Foreign Affairs | 22 October 2022 |
| | Guido Crosetto | Minister of Defence | 22 October 2022 |
| | Matteo Piantedosi | Minister of the Interior | 22 October 2022 |
| | Giancarlo Giorgetti | Minister of Economy and Finance | 22 October 2022 |
| | Adolfo Urso | Minister of Business and Made in Italy | 22 October 2022 |
| | Alfredo Mantovano | Secretary of the Council of Ministers | 22 October 2022 |
| | Admiral; Giuseppe Cavo Dragone | Chief of the Defence Staff | 19 October 2021 |
| | Francesco Saverio Garofani | Secretary of the Supreme Council of Defence | 24 February 2022 |

== Bibliography ==
- Antonio Intelisano, "Il Consiglio Supremo di Difesa nel sistema costituzionale," Rivista Militare no. 2 (March 1, 1994): 4-11.
- Riccardo Bellandi, Il Consiglio supremo di difesa. Storia, organizzazione, attività, Il Mulino, Bologna, 2011.
