= Institutions of constitutional importance (Italy) =

The institutions of constitutional importance of the Italian Republic (Italian: organi di rilievo costituzionale della Repubblica Italiana) are those institutions which are mentioned by the Constitution of Italy, but are not directly defined by it.

== Characteristics ==
Unlike the constitutional institutions of Italy, the institutions of constitutional importance do not take part in the so-called "political process"; they do not directly determine the goals the state will pursue, but are supplementary to those goals. The institutions of constitutional importance contribute to the maintenance of the democratic order and are therefore also called "auxiliary institutions" (organi ausiliari). Unlike constitutional organs, they can be abolished altogether, although this would require a constitutional law

Although these institutions are mentioned in the constitution, it is left to the ordinary law to define their organisation, their structure and their powers.

== List of institutions of constitutional importance ==
Currently there are five institutions of constitutional importance:

- National Council for Economics and Labour
- Council of State
- Court of Audit
- High Council of the Judiciary (Italy)
- High Council of Defence

== See also ==
- Constitutional institutions (Italy)
- Constitutional body
