= Framework law =

Framework laws are laws that are more specific than constitutional provisions. They lay down general obligations and principles but leave to governing authorities the task of enacting the further legislation and other specific measures, as may be required.
