= Italian law codes =

The Italian law codes constitute the codified law of Italy. They include a civil code and its related procedure code, a criminal code and its related procedure code, and a navigation code. Starting from the 1980s, more specific subjects were needed and specific codes were created to better codify the law.

== History ==
There used to be only five codes of Italian law: the civil code (codice civile), the code of civil procedure (codice di procedura civile), the criminal code (codice penale), the code of criminal procedure (codice di procedura penale), and the navigation code (codice della navigazione).

=== Civil code ===
The civil code represents private law. The civil code also outlines commercial law and is the code dealing with corporate law. The first civil code was enacted in 1865, and was reformed in 1942.

=== Civil procedure code ===
This code contains the rules for civil proceedings before a court of law.

=== Criminal code ===
The criminal code has its origins in Roman law and in Middle Ages canonical law, although the code in its current state was written during the French Enlightenment. All offences are classified as either delitti or contravvenzioni, the former representing the more serious of the two.

=== Navigation code ===
The navigation code is the principal set of rules governing the internal states and situations of sea and air navigation. It was approved originally during 1942 and subsequently amended 2005 and 2006.

== See also ==
- Law and criminal justice of Italy

== Bibliography ==
- Amoroso, Giovanni; Di Cerbo, Vincenzo; Maresca, Arturo (2017). Il diritto del lavoro. Fonti del diritto italiano (in Italian). Vol. II voll. (5th ed.). Milan: Giuffrè. ISBN 9788814212710. OCLC 991607122 – via Google Books.
- D'Ancona, Linda D'Ancona (13 May 2015). "Mansioni del lavoratore e tutela 'flessibile' nel disegno del Jobs act". Questione Giustizia (in Italian).
- De Gioia, Valerio De Gioia; Spirito, Giovanna (2015). Codice del nuovo processo del lavoro: dopo il D. Lgs. 4 marzo 2015, n. 23 (disposizioni in materia di contratto di lavoro a tempo indeterminato a tutele crescenti, Jobs act): annotato con dottrina, giurisprudenza e formule. Codici del professionista (n. 1 of 68) (in Italian) (2nd ed.). Rome: Neldiritto. ISBN 9788866574668. OCLC 962797220.
- Di Stefano, Livia; Pellacani, Giuseppe; Russo, Alberto (2018). Basenghi, Francesco; Levi, Alberto (eds.). Le semplificazioni procedurali, le sanzioni e le pari opportunità nel Jobs Act. Il nuovo diritto del lavoro (n. 10) (in Italian). G. Giappichelli. p. 15 (Appendix). ISBN 9788892169357. OCLC 1022793598 – via Google Books.
- Meroni, Franco; Motta, Angelo; Platti, Rinaldo Pietro (2018). Il lavoro: manuale per consulenti e operatori del diritto (in Italian) (2nd ed.). Giuffrè. p. 1352. ISBN 9788814224669. OCLC 1041541949 – via Google Books.
- "Riforma del lavoro (ottobre 2015) Bibliografia (2017)" (in Italian). Legislative Assembly of Emilia-Romagna. 23 October 2015.
- Santoro Passerelli, Giuseppe (2014). Diritto e processo del lavoro e della previdenza sociale (in Italian). UTET Giuridica. p. 868. ISBN 9788859810261. OCLC 987144756 – via Google Books.
