= Italian torpedo =

The Italian Torpedo (sometimes referred to as the Belgian Torpedo) is a term used in private international law to describe the act of bringing a case before a court in a state which suffers from major delays in judicial proceedings, such as Italy or Belgium, as to delay the judicial resolution of the dispute or the proceedings. The term was coined by Mario Franzosi in a 1997 article titled "Worldwide Patent Litigation and the Italian Torpedo", published in the European Intellectual Property Review.

The lis pendens-rule in article 29 of the Brussels I-bis Regulation (no. 1215/2012) provides that when proceedings involving the same cause of action and between the same parties are brought in the courts of different member states, all courts, other than the one first seized, must stay the proceedings until the first court seized has ruled upon its own jurisdiction.

The European Court of Justice has left little possibility to counter an Italian Torpedo as it has ruled that the principle of mutual trust between the member states is of utmost importance and cannot be overridden in order to counter a torpedo.

However, using an Italian Torpedo is excluded for matters in which a court has exclusive jurisdiction as provided in article 24 Brussels-Ibis, such as proceedings which have as their object rights in rem in immovable property, the validity of entries in public registers etc.

This issue was largely addressed in 2012, when article 31(2) Brussels I-bis was added to prevent the use of this tactic in the case where an exclusive jurisdiction agreement exists (such as a forum selection clause). However, exit of the UK from the European Union (and the applicable Brussels I-bis regulation) has caused a return of this tactic for agreements governed by English law.
