= Supreme Court of Cassation (Italy) =

Italian Court of Justice in Rome

- Corte Suprema di Cassazione
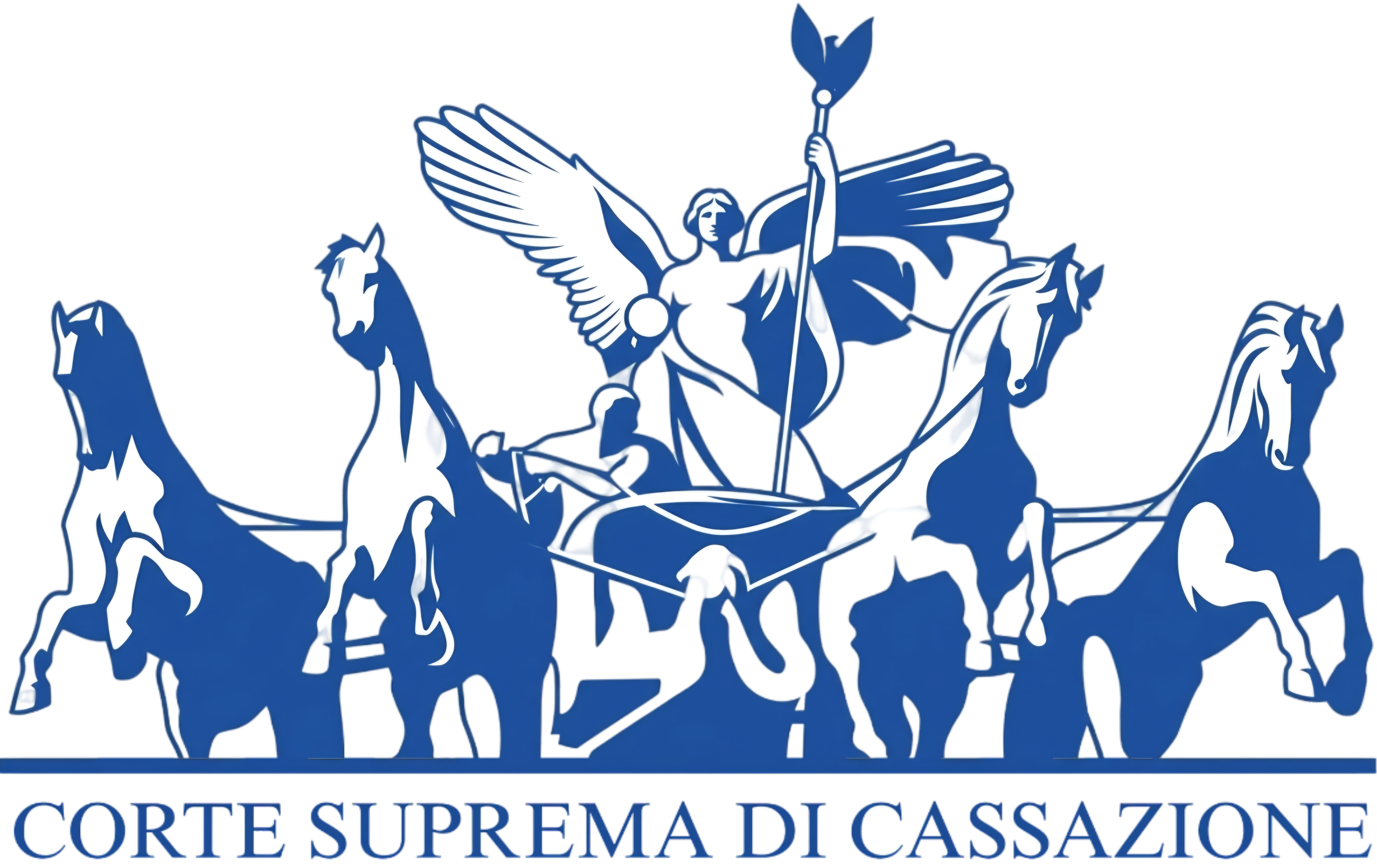
- Established: 24 March 1923
- Jurisdiction: Italy
- Location: Rome, Italy
- Authorised by: Constitution of Italy
- Number of positions: 65
- Website: Official website

President
- Currently: Pasquale D'Ascola
- Since: 9 September 2025

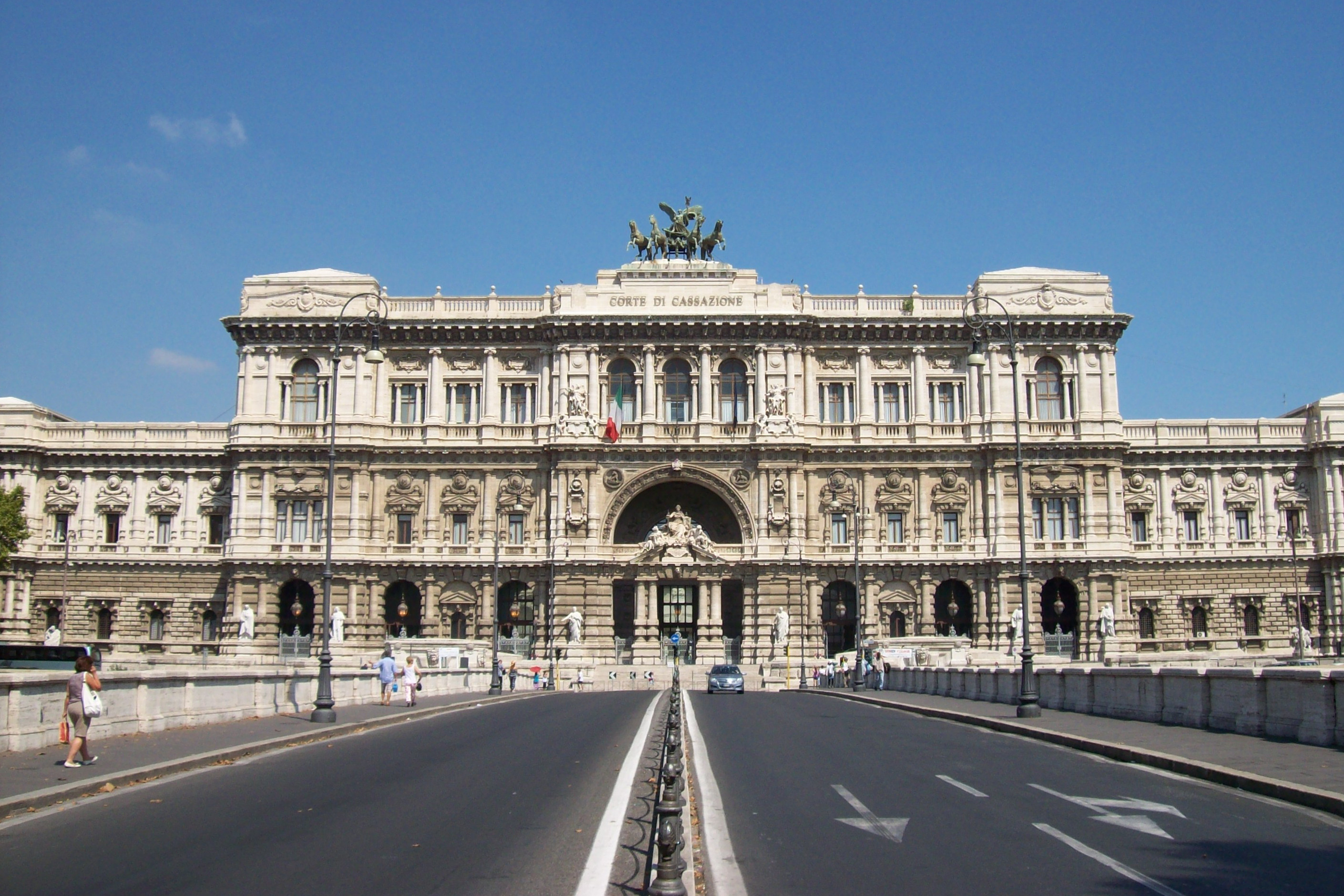
The Palace of Justice in Rome, which houses the Supreme Court of Cassation

The Supreme Court of Cassation (Italian: Corte Suprema di Cassazione) is the highest court of appeal or court of last resort in Italy. It has its seat in the Palace of Justice, Rome.

The Court of Cassation also ensures the correct application of law in the inferior and appeal courts and resolves disputes as to which lower court (penal, civil, administrative, military) has jurisdiction to hear a given case.

== Procedure ==
The Italian Supreme Court of Cassation is the highest court of Italy. Appeals to the Court of Cassation generally come from the Appellate Court, the second instance courts, but defendants or prosecutors may also appeal directly from trial courts, first instance courts. The Supreme Court can reject, or confirm, a sentence from a lower court. If it rejects the sentence, it can order the lower court to amend the trial and sentencing, or it can annul the previous sentence altogether. A sentence confirmed by the Supreme Court of Cassation is final and definitive, and cannot be further appealed for the same reasons. Although the Supreme Court of Cassation cannot overrule the trial court's interpretation of the evidence it can correct a lower court's interpretation or application of the law connected to a specific case.

As explained by the Cassazione, "The appeal in cassation may be lodged against the measures issued by the ordinary courts at the appellate level or in degree only: the reasons given to support the use may be, in civil matters, the violation of the right material (errores in iudicando) or procedural (errores in proceeding), the vices of motivation (lack, insufficiency or contradiction) of the judgment under appeal; or, again, the grounds for jurisdiction. A similar scheme is expected to appeal to the Supreme Court in criminal matters".

The Italian judicial system is based on civil law within the framework of late Roman law, and not based on common law. Its core principles are entirely codified into a normative system which serves as the primary source of law, which means judicial decisions of the supreme court, as well as those of lower courts, are binding within the frame of reference of each individual case submitted, but do not constitute the base for judicial precedent for other future cases as in Common Law. While in Civil Law jurisdictions the doctrine of stare decisis (precedent) does not apply, in practice the decisions of the Supreme Court of Cassation usually provide a very robust reference point in jurisprudence constante. The two essential aims of the Supreme Court of Cassation are to ensure that lower courts correctly follow legal procedure, and to harmonize the interpretation of laws throughout the judicial system.

== Members and organization ==
The Supreme Court of Cassation is organized into two divisions: a criminal section and a civil section. The court has a general president, The First President of the Court of Cassation, a deputy, and each section has its own president. Cases brought to the supreme court are normally heard by a panel of five judges. In more complex cases, especially those concerning compounded matters of statutory interpretation an extended panel of nine judges ("united sections" of the supreme court) hear the case. In addition, in every case submitted to the supreme court, the office of public prosecutor must state their interpretation of the applicable law, to assist and facilitate the court, in a consultative capacity, in reaching its final decision.

== Brief history ==
The need for this kind of court in Europe became apparent with the Ancien Régime's difficulties in maintaining both uniformity of interpretation and supremacy of the central laws against local privileges and rights. This kind of court first appeared during the French Revolution. The original French courts were initially much more like a legislative body than a judicial one. During his conquests, Napoleon greatly influenced Italian legal theory, and the Court of Cassation was formed using many imported French ideas.

The Court of Cassation was provided by the former Italian Civil Code in 1865 and then it was reorganized by royal decree 12 on 30 January 1941, supplanting the previous court.

On 1 March 2023, the High Council of the Judiciary unanimously elected the magistrate Margherita Cassano in the role of first president of the Court of Cassation. She is the first woman to hold this position.

== See also ==
- Court of cassation (for other courts of cassation around the world)
- Corte Costituzionale
- Judiciary of Italy
- Palazzo di Giustizia (Rome) (Wikimedia Commons)
