= Villa Mapelli Mozzi =

Villa in Ponte San Pietro, Italy

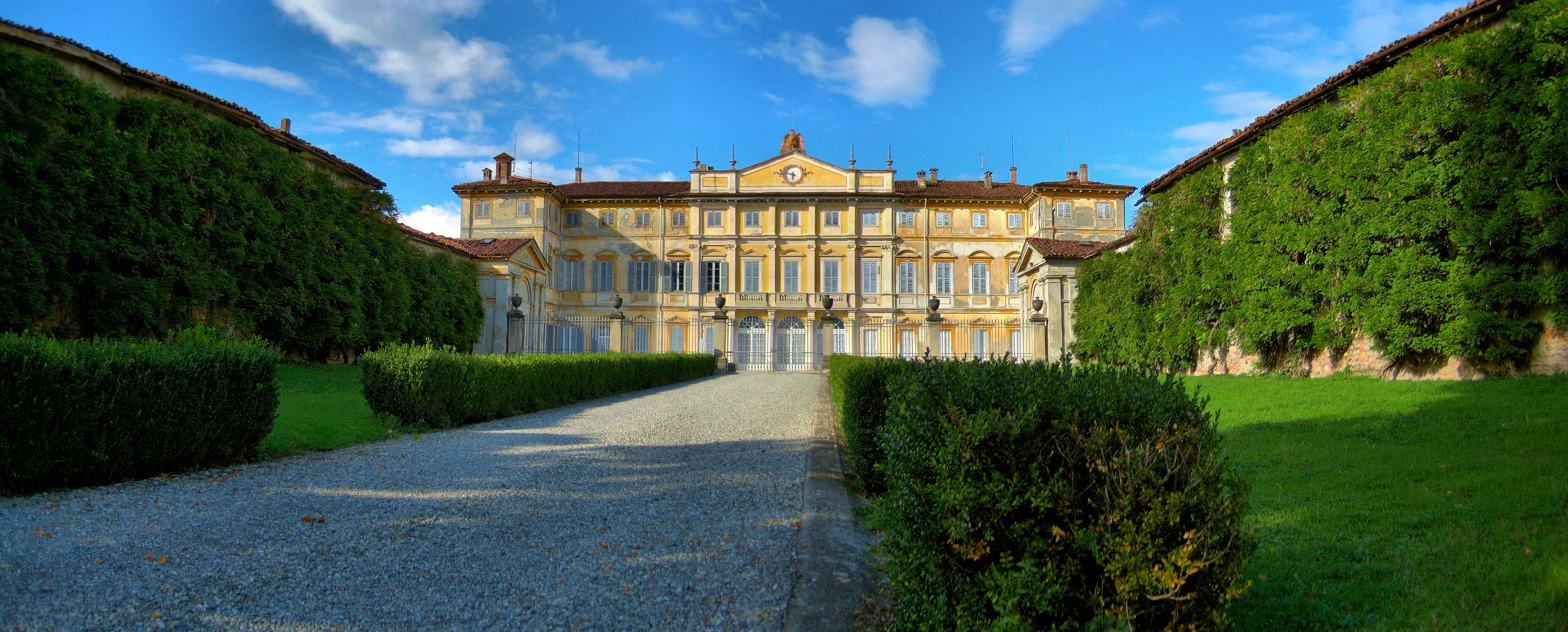
- Villa Mapelli Mozzi in 2010
- Click on the map for a fullscreen view

General information
- Architectural style: Neoclassical
- Location: Ponte San Pietro, Lombardy, Italy
- Coordinates: 45.7021°N 9.5780°E

Villa Mapelli Mozzi, also known as Villa Mozzi or Villa Mapelli, is an 18th-century neoclassical-style rural palace in Lombardy, northern Italy, which is situated at Sottoriva di Locate Bergamasco, a frazione outside Ponte San Pietro, in the province of Bergamo.

Owned by the family since 1460, the Villa Mapelli Mozzi is one of Lombardy's grandest neoclassical buildings. The park is open to visitors, but not its interior.

== History ==
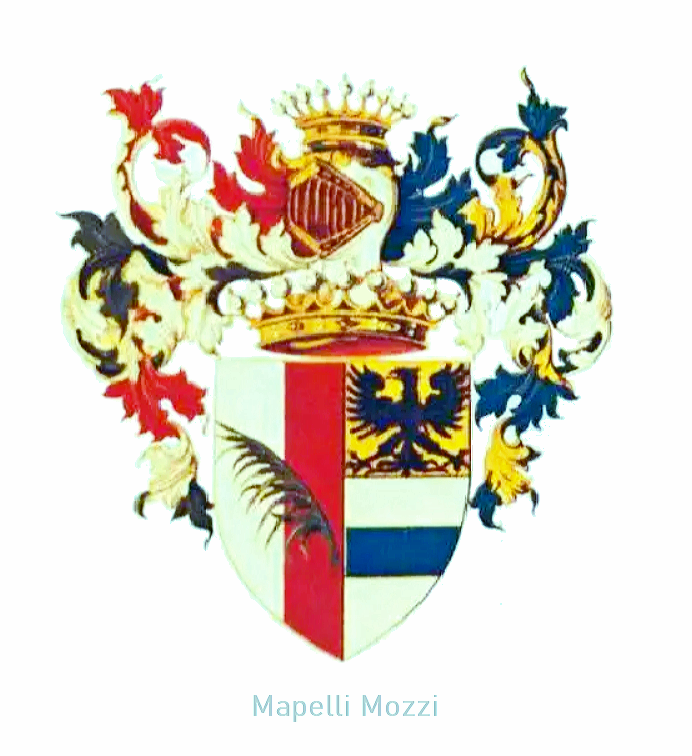
The Counts Mapelli Mozzi (cr. 1913) arms, impaling Mapelli (dexter) with Mozzi (sinister)

The original medieval monastery came into a cadet branch of the Mozzi patrician family, through the marriage in 1460 between Giovanni Filippo Mozzi and Caterina Comenduno. Having fallen into disrepair by the 17th century, their great-great-great-great-great-great-great-grandson, Count Enrico Mozzi (1733–1800) who married Francesca Alamanni, renovated the estate between 1770 and 1780 with the construction of a new Palladian-style Villa Mozzi. Its design, inspired by the Royal Villa of Monza and the Teatro alla Scala in Milan, is attributed to local architect, Giovanni Moroni, a follower of Giuseppe Piermarini.

Count Giovanni Battista Mozzi (1768–1813), their elder surviving son, married in 1788 Angela Baglioni, daughter of Giovanni Paolo Baglioni (Podestà & Capitano of Chioggia); the nuptial mass at Bergamo Cathedral was led by his uncle, Luigi Mozzi. His first wife, Countess Angela, died in childbirth leaving an only child and heiress, Angela Mozzi (1790–1851) married in 1809 to Dott. Girolamo Mapelli (1785–1842), whose offspring assumed the surname and arms of Mapelli Mozzi.

Their son married Ippolita Giulini di Vialba (1827–1887) becoming jure uxoris Count Alessandro Mapelli Mozzi (1815–1879), the father of Paolo Mapelli Mozzi (cr. Count Mapelli) whose wife was Enrica Tarsis (1866–1941), brother of Giampaolo Tarsis, I Conte di Castel d'Agogna (cr. 1927).

Created by Letters Patent in 1913 as a hereditary Count of the Kingdom of Italy with remainder to all male descendants, the Counts Mozzi were granted as an additional surname to the title by Regio Decreto in 1935, becoming formally styled as Count Mapelli Mozzi.

The family estate also comprises another Villa Mapelli Mozzi located at Casatenovo, between Bergamo and Lake Como.

== Legacy ==
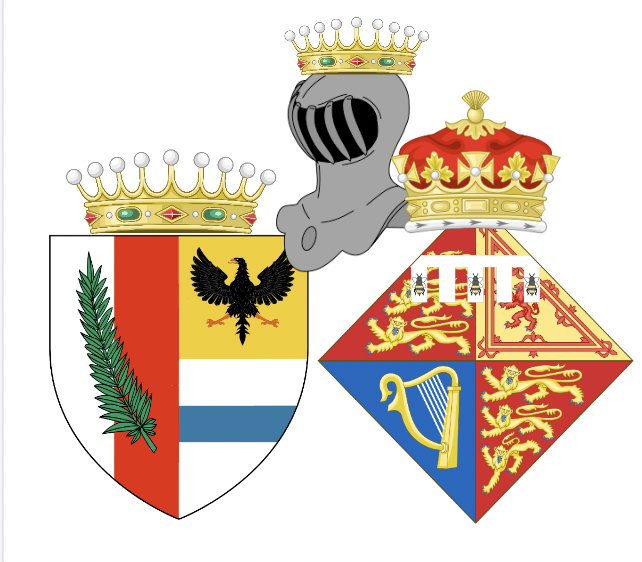
Conjugal arms of Count Edo Mapelli Mozzi and Princess Beatrice

The interior of the Ponte San Pietro villa comprises a large staircase leading to a piano nobile frescoed by Vincenzo Angelo Orelli, Paolo Vincenzo Bonomini, and Agostino Comerio. Stylistic enhancements to its late 18th-century design were overseen in 1927 by the architect, Ludovico Barbiano di Belgiojoso.

The Villa Mapelli Mozzi has long held the family's significant art collection, formerly curated by international art dealer Count Alex Mapelli Mozzi, whose daughter-in-law is Princess Beatrice. (Note: Count Alessandro Mapelli Mozzi was married to Nicola "Nikki" Diana Burrows, MBE (b. 1956) from Oxfordshire on 8 March 1978, paternal granddaughter of Sir Robert Burrows and his wife, Lady Burrows (née Eleanor Doris Bainbridge), great-granddaughter of Bainbridge's founder Emerson Muschamp Bainbridge. Their only son, Count Edoardo Mapelli Mozzi is married to Princess Beatrice, a member of the British royal family, elder daughter of Prince Andrew, Duke of York and granddaughter of Queen Elizabeth II, whose elder daughter, Sienna Elizabeth Mapelli Mozzi (b. 2021) is currently 10th in the line of succession to the British throne, while their younger daughter, Athena Elizabeth Rose Mapelli Mozzi (b. 2025) is 11th in line to the throne.)

Among the family's other notable descendants are Count Carlo Mapelli Mozzi (1889–1966) whose wife was Princess Beatrice Barberini (1906–1983), and Marchesa Carmela Pallavicino née Mapelli Mozzi (1895–1947).

== See also ==
- Italian nobility
