= Robert Burrows (politician) =

British industrialist

Burrows in 1952.

Sir Robert Abraham Burrows KBE JP (17 March 1884 – 14 August 1964), was a British industrialist who served as High Sheriff of Cheshire (for 1940/41).

== Family background ==
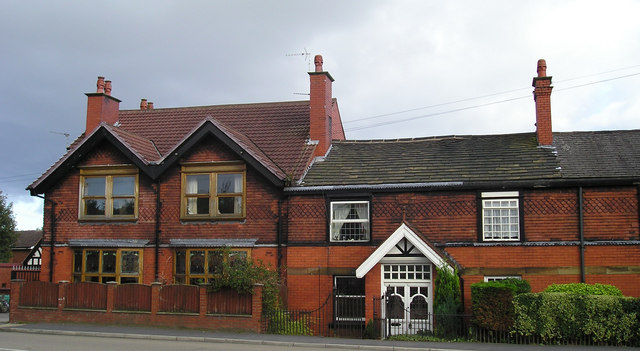
Green Hall, Atherton, where Sir Robert Burrows was born

Scion of an ancient East Anglian family (variously spelled Burgh, Burroughes, Burrowes), his grandfather Alderman Abraham Burrows JP (1827–1901) moved from Great Yarmouth to south Lancashire where he prospered in coal mining and logistics, later becoming seated at the Green Hall, Atherton. His second son, Miles Formby Burrows JP (1856–1943) married Gertrude née Dawbarn in 1882, having three sons, Robert, Walter (a Major) and Miles (a Captain in the Army).

Educated at the Leys School, Cambridge, Robert Burrows joined the family firm of Fletcher, Burrows and Company in 1904. In 1911, he married Eleanor Doris Bainbridge (1891–1975), great-granddaughter of Bainbridge's founder Emerson Muschamp Bainbridge.

Sir Robert and Lady Burrows had two sons and two daughters. Their younger son, (Robert) David Burrows JP (1929–1993) married Susan Arnot Heath (who married secondly Colonel Greville Wyndham Tufnell CVO DL), having two daughters:

- Nicola Diana Burrows, now Williams-Ellis, MBE (born 1956), who married firstly Count Alex Mapelli-Mozzi, whose daughter-in-law since 2020 is Princess Beatrice;
- Philippa Anne Burrows (born 1965), wife of Mark Wiggin FRICS, of Downton Hall, Shropshire, whose great-grandfather was Brigadier-General Edgar Wiggin DSO, High Sheriff of Warwickshire (for 1930/31).

== Life and career ==
A director of Fletcher, Burrows and Company which merged in 1929 with Manchester Collieries Ltd, he was appointed Chairman of Lancashire Associated Collieries. Founding President of the Lancashire and Cheshire Coal Research Association (1918–28), Burrows also served as a member of the Fuel Research Board (1923–27).

Chairman of the London, Midland and Scottish Railway (1946-47), Sir Robert presented a flower bouquet in the shape of a large heart as a "personal tribute" wishing farewell to Princess Elizabeth and her fiancé Lieutenant Philip Mountbatten in the presence of King George VI, his wife Queen Elizabeth and Princess Margaret, before the Royal Train departed Crewe for Scotland in July 1947. Burrows was seated at Bonis Hall, near Prestbury, Cheshire, where in the 1930s house guests included HRH the Duke of York (the future George VI), who became a friend through their mutual involvement with the National Association of Boys' Clubs. In 1945 Sir Robert became Chairman of Remploy Ltd.

Knighted in the 1937 New Year Honours, Burrows served as a Justice of the Peace for Lancashire, and as High Sheriff of Cheshire for 1940/41.

Appointed CStJ in 1948, Sir Robert was advanced KBE in the 1952 New Year Honours "for services to the disabled".

=== Politics ===
Following his family's Liberal tradition, Burrows stood as the Liberal prospective parliamentary candidate for the Leigh Division of Lancashire at the 1923 General Election. Hoping to regain a seat lost to Labour in 1922 when the predecessor Liberal candidate finished third, Burrows increased the Liberal Party's vote with a 10% swing but finished second by 4,000 votes. He did not seek election to Parliament again.

==== Electoral record ====
General Election 1923: Leigh
Party	Candidate	Votes	%	±%
Labour	John Joseph Tinker	13,989	43.0	−2.0
Liberal	Robert Abraham Burrows	9,854	30.3	+9.2
Unionist	Captain Herbert Metcalfe	8,664	26.7	−7.2
Majority		4,135	12.7	+1.6
Turnout			86.5	−3.4
Labour hold		Swing	-5.6	

== Honours and arms ==
Among other distinctions and appointments, Sir Robert Burrows received the following honours:

- Knight Commander of the Order of the British Empire (1952)
- Knight Bachelor (1937)
- Commander of the Order of St John (1948);

Coat of arms of Sir Robert Burrows

Adopted
Grant (Heralds' College, London), 1906
Crest
In front of a Cross patée Gules an Eagle's Head erased Proper
Helm
That of a Knight
Escutcheon
Gules a Fesse Vaire in chief two Lions rampant Or and in base a Stag's Head cabossed Argent attired Or
Motto
Semper fidelis (Latin)
Orders
Surrounding the Shield the circlet of the Order of the British Empire (post-1952); (pre-1952) the circlet of the Order of Saint John:
Other versions
As heraldic heiresses, his son, David Burrows' two daughters may marshal his arms in an escutcheon of pretence on their respective husband's family arms, viz. Mapelli Mozzi (whilst married) and Wiggin, whose children and descendants quarter the patrilineal arms with those of Burrows.

== See also ==
- Bonis Hall
- High Sheriff of Cheshire
- 1923 United Kingdom general election results by constituency
