= Edoardo Mapelli Mozzi =

British businessman (born 1983)

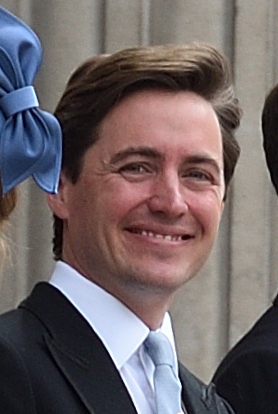
- Mapelli Mozzi in 2022
- Born: 19 November 1983 (age 43); London, England
- Education: University of Edinburgh
- Occupation: Property developer
- Spouse: Princess Beatrice (m. 2020)
- Partner: Dara Huang (2015–2018)
- Children: 3
- Parents: Alex Mapelli-Mozzi (father); Nikki Burrows (mother)
- Relatives: Sir Robert Abraham Burrows (great-grandfather)

Edoardo Alessandro Mapelli Mozzi (born 19 November 1983) is a British property developer descended from Italian nobility. He is the founder and chief executive of Banda Property, a property development and interior design company. He became a member of the British royal family in 2020 when he married Princess Beatrice, a niece of King Charles III. He has two daughters with Beatrice and a son from a previous relationship with architect Dara Huang.

== Background ==
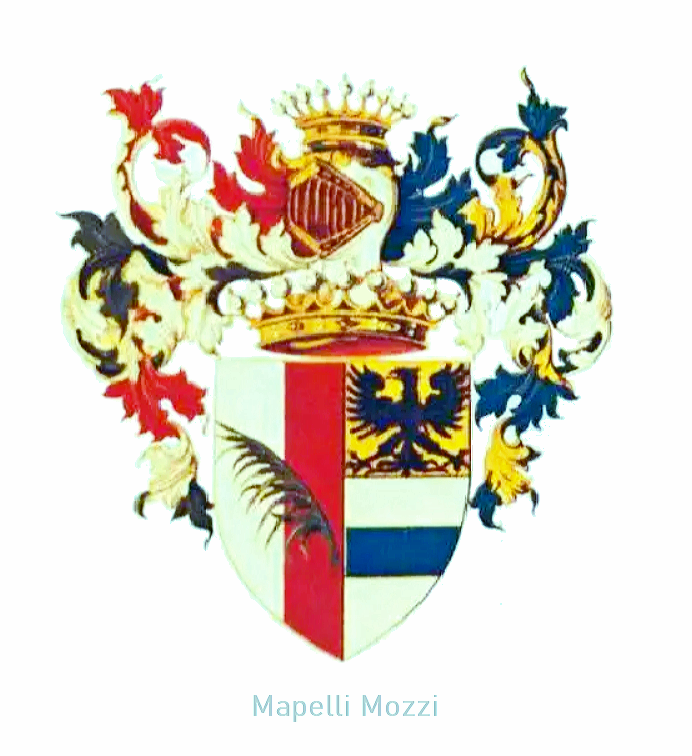
Coat of Arms of the Counts Mapelli Mozzi (1913)

Edoardo Alessandro Mapelli Mozzi was born on 19 November 1983 at the Portland Hospital in the West End of London. He is the son of Alessandro "Alex" Mapelli Mozzi, a British Olympian and member of a formerly titled Italian noble family whose ancestral seat is Villa Mapelli Mozzi in the Bergamo province of Italy.

The BBC states that Mapelli Mozzi is a count; although titles of nobility are not officially recognised in the Italian Republic, they can still be used out of courtesy. The hereditary title of count in the Kingdom of Italy was awarded to Mapelli Mozzi's family in 1913 by King Victor Emmanuel III, in particular to all legitimate male-line descendants bearing the surname of the noble family of Mozzi, which was previously incorporated into the noble family of Mapelli.

Mapelli Mozzi's mother is Nicola "Nikki" Diana Williams-Ellis, paternal granddaughter of businessman and Liberal Party politician Sir Robert Abraham Burrows and Lady Burrows, (née Eleanor Doris Bainbridge; 1891–1975), the daughter of Bainbridge's founder Emerson Muschamp Bainbridge. Nicola was later married to businessman and Conservative politician Christopher Shale. In 2017, she married for the third time, this time to a sculptor David Williams-Ellis. Mapelli Mozzi has an older sister, Natalia Alice Yeomans (born 1981), and a younger half-brother, Albemarle "Alby" Shale (born 1991).

== Career ==
Mapelli Mozzi attended the Dragon School in Oxford, then Radley College in Oxfordshire, before obtaining an M.A. in Politics at the University of Edinburgh.

At the age of 23, with the support of his family, he started Banda, a property development and interior design company, which claims to develop homes in "undervalued" parts of London. This has been challenged by property experts on Twitter and Forbes, who argue that "there is nothing undervalued in Notting Hill", where Mapelli Mozzi's latest project is located, and describe the district as "a super prime residential destination".

Mapelli Mozzi holds directorships in a number of companies, some of them with his mother, Nikki Williams-Ellis, and his brother-in-law, Tod Yeomans. Ahead of the 2016 London mayoral election, Mapelli Mozzi wrote an article for Property Week, urging the future mayor to insist on redevelopment projects in central London. He has also criticised politicians Andrea Leadsom and Jeremy Corbyn.

=== Cricket Builds Hope ===
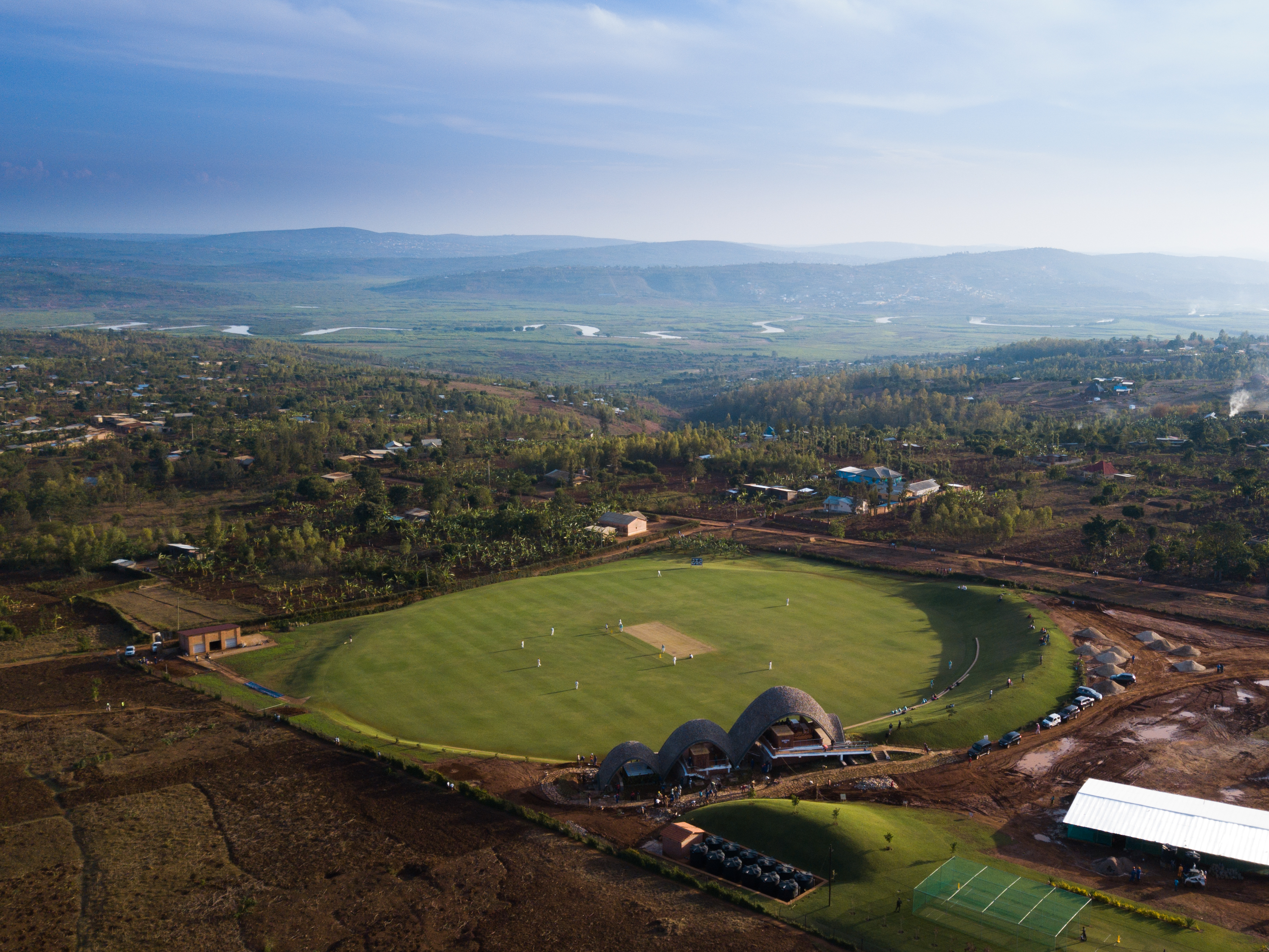
The Gahanga Cricket Stadium

Mapelli Mozzi is a co-founder of the British-Rwandan charity "Cricket Builds Hope", which aims to use cricket as "a tool for positive social change" in Rwanda, East Africa. Previously known as the Rwanda Cricket Stadium Foundation (RCSF), the charity was founded in 2011 to build Rwanda's first grass wicket cricket ground, now known as Gahanga International Cricket Stadium. Mapelli Mozzi's stepfather Christopher Shale (1954–2001), British businessman and a Conservative politician came up with the idea for the charity but died before he could get it off the ground. Shale's family and friends set up the foundation after his death; Mapelli Mozzi's maternal half-brother, Albemarle "Alby" Shale (born 1991), is on the board of trustees. There are six charity's patrons. They are: Jonathan Agnew, Brian Lara, Heather Knight, Ebony Rainford-Brent, Sam Billings and Makhaya Ntini. In 2012, Mapelli Mozzi cycled 100 kilometres (62 mi) overnight in London in the Nightrider Challenge to raise funds for the Cricket Builds Hope foundation.

== Personal life ==
Mapelli Mozzi was engaged to American architect Dara Huang until 2018. They have a son, Christopher Woolf "Wolfie", born in 2016.

In 2018, Mapelli Mozzi began a relationship with Princess Beatrice, whom he has known since childhood. His family have been close friends with her parents, Andrew Mountbatten-Windsor and Sarah Ferguson, for decades.

In March 2019, Beatrice attended a fundraising event at the National Portrait Gallery, London, accompanied by Mapelli Mozzi. Following his proposal in Italy, the couple's engagement was announced on 26 September 2019. Mapelli Mozzi was reported to have designed the engagement ring along with British jeweller Shaun Leane.

The couple intended to marry at the Chapel Royal of St James's Palace on 29 May 2020 but postponed the ceremony in light of the COVID-19 pandemic. A private wedding took place at the Royal Chapel of All Saints in Windsor Great Park on 17 July 2020.

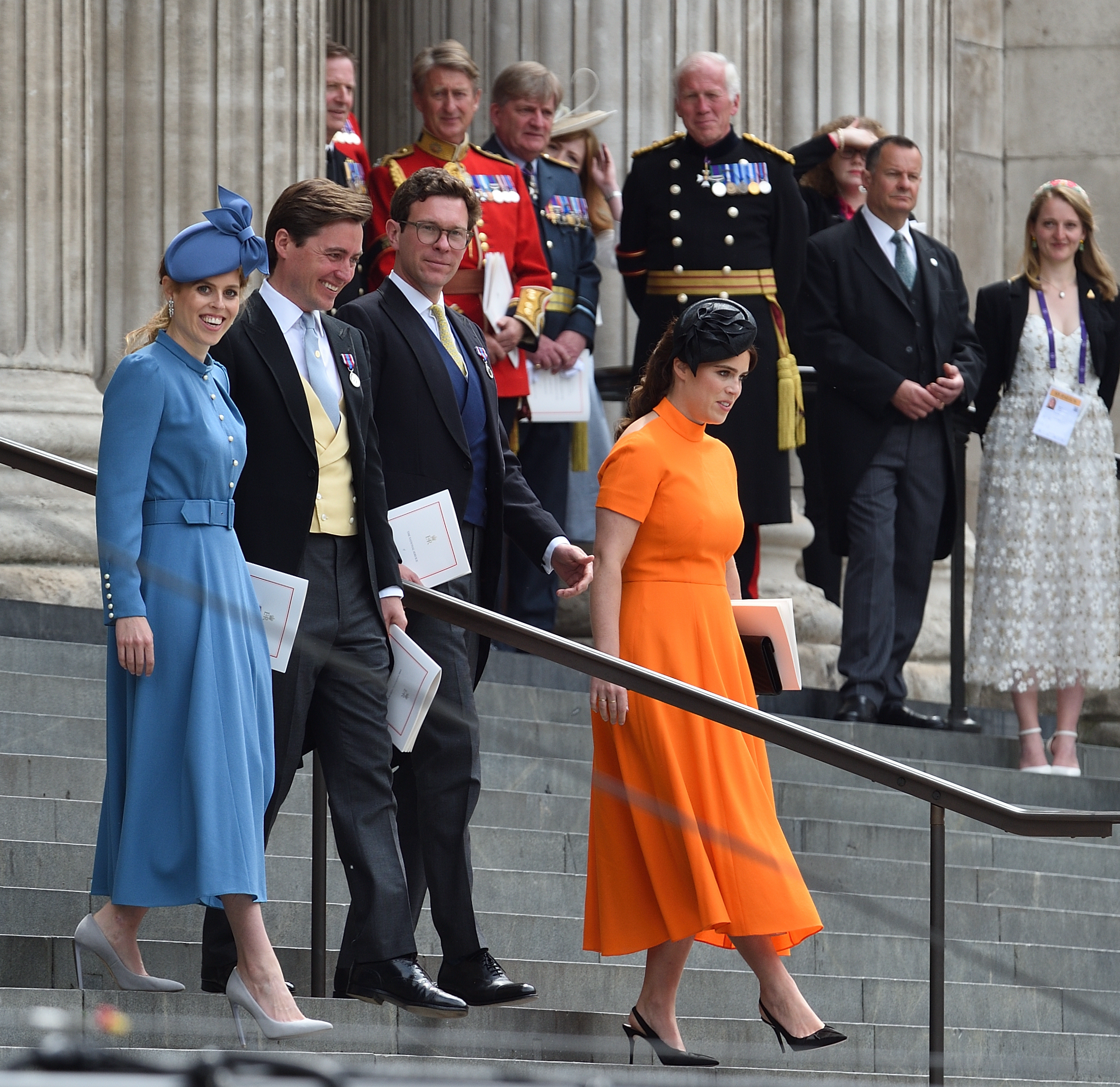
Mapelli Mozzi with his wife Beatrice, her sister Eugenie, and Eugenie's husband Jack in 2022

Beatrice gave birth to their first daughter, Sienna Elizabeth Mapelli Mozzi, on 18 September 2021 at the Chelsea and Westminster Hospital. Sienna is currently 10th in the line of succession to the British throne. Their second daughter, Athena Elizabeth Rose Mapelli Mozzi, was born on 22 January 2025 at Chelsea and Westminster Hospital, several weeks prematurely. Athena is currently 11th in the line of succession.

The couple initially lived in a four-bedroom apartment at St James's Palace, but they reportedly moved to a manor home in the Cotswolds in late 2022. In an August 2021 interview, Beatrice revealed that Mapelli Mozzi, like her, is dyslexic.

Mapelli Mozzi is active on social media, including Twitter, where he has spoken against plastic pollution in the oceans and whaling in Japan, and shared messages about gun control in the United States. He has criticised British politicians Andrea Leadsom and Jeremy Corbyn in the past, and used the hashtag "ImWithHer" on Twitter on the night of the 2016 United States presidential election to show his support for the Democratic candidate Hillary Clinton.

== Honours ==
Date	Medal	Ribbon
6 February 2022	Queen Elizabeth II Platinum Jubilee Medal	
6 May 2023	King Charles III Coronation Medal	

== Authored articles ==
- Mapelli Mozzi, Edo (2 May 2016). "Mayoral election: without more homes 'Building for Londoners' policy will fall flat". Property Week.
