= Alex Mapelli-Mozzi =

British Olympian

Alex Mapelli Mozzi
Personal information
- Full name: Alessandro Mapelli Mozzi
- Nationality: Italian and British
- Born: 7 May 1951 (age 75) Buenos Aires, Argentina
- Home town: Bergamo, Lombardy, Italy
- Education: Downside School
- Spouses: Nicola Diana Burrows (m. 1978); Margaretha Ankarcrona née von Eckermann (m. 1988); Fiona Wilson (m. 1994)
- Children: 2
- Relatives: Count Luigi Mapelli Mozzi (Grandfather); Princess Beatrice (Daughter in Law); Lady Lucinda Ankarcrona (Stepdaughter in Law)
- Other interests: the Arts

Sport
- Country: GB
- Sport: Alpine skiing

Achievements and titles
- Olympic finals: Sapporo 1972

Alessandro "Alex" Mapelli Mozzi (born 7 May 1951) is an Argentine-born Anglo-Italian aristocrat and former Alpine skier for the Great Britain Olympic team.

Since 2020, Mapelli Mozzi is the father-in-law of Princess Beatrice.

== Life and background ==
=== Early life and career ===
Born in Buenos Aires, Argentina in 1951, he is the only child of Giampaolo Mapelli Mozzi (1922–1980) by his Swiss wife, Gigliola née Stoppani (1926–2003), he grew up at the ancestral seat, Villa Mapelli Mozzi in Sottoriva near Ponte San Pietro, where his family's works of art are housed. Another family residence at Casatenovo, between Bergamo and Lake Como also Villa Mapelli Mozzi, was built in the 15th century as a monastery and is now a luxury hotel.

From May 1965 to July 1969, Mapelli-Mozzi attended Downside School as a boarder, becoming a notable sportsman and excelled in alpine pursuits. A dual British and Italian citizen, he represented Great Britain in three downhill skiing events at the Sapporo 1972 Winter Olympics.

Mixing in upper-class social circles and a member of the Ski Club of Great Britain, Mapelli-Mozzi later became an international art dealer and curator, and was elected a Fellow of the Royal Society of Arts (FRSA).

=== Ancestry and title ===
Of ancient descent from Alberto de Mapello, a City Councilman of Bergamo, son of Oberto de Mapello, who fought in defence of the Lombard League in 1168 against Emperor Frederick I, the Mapelli Mozzi name came about from the marriage in 1808 of Girolamo Mapelli (1785–1842) with Angela Mozzi (1790–1851), granddaughter of Count Enrico Mozzi (1733–1800), great-niece of Fr Luigi Mozzi and eventual heiress to the Villa Mozzi estate. Their son married Ippolita Giulini di Vialba (1827–1887) becoming jure uxoris Count Alessandro Mapelli Mozzi (1815–1879), the father of Paolo Mapelli Mozzi (cr. Count Mapelli) whose wife was Enrica Tarsis (1866–1941), brother of Giampaolo Tarsis, I Conte di Castel d'Agogna (cr. 1927).

His grandfather Luigi Mapelli Mozzi (1894–1948) married María Mercedes née Baroli (1891–1979), dividing their time between homes in Lombardy and the Côte d'Azur. His great-aunt Carmela Mapelli Mozzi (1895–1947) married in 1920, Uberto Resta-Pallavicino, II Marchese Pallavicino (cr. 1910).

Luigi Mapelli Mozzi was the second son of Paolo Mapelli Mozzi (1854–1921), elevated as Count Mapelli by King Victor Emmanuel III upon the recommendation of Ottorino Gentiloni. Created by letters patent in 1913 as a hereditary count of the Kingdom of Italy with remainder to all his male descendants, Mozzi was granted as an additional surname to the title by royal decree in 1935, becoming formally styled as Count Mapelli Mozzi.

Italian noble titles, as with most European nobility, may continue to be used nowadays by social courtesy, their legal standing in Italy having ceased in 1948 and having no formal recognition in the United Kingdom.

=== Family ===
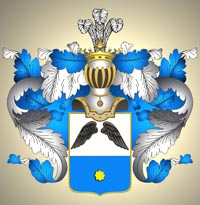
Margaretha von Eckermann's family arms

Mapelli-Mozzi married firstly on 8 March 1978 Nicola "Nikki" Burrows, elder daughter of (Robert) David Burrows (1929–1993) and paternal granddaughter of Sir Robert Burrows by his wife Eleanor, great-granddaughter of Emerson Muschamp Bainbridge. They have a daughter and a son, Edoardo (born 1983), husband of Princess Beatrice.

Mapelli-Mozzi married secondly in 1988 Margaretha née von Eckermann, formerly wife of Jan Ankarcrona and a descendant of Western Pomeranian Swedish nobility. He married thirdly, in 1994, horse breeder Fiona Wilson.

Thrice divorced, Mapelli-Mozzi now lives in Provence, France.

== See also ==
- Consulta Araldica
- Count Edoardo Mapelli Mozzi
- Villa Mapelli Mozzi
