= Wedding of Princess Beatrice and Edoardo Mapelli Mozzi =

2020 British royal wedding

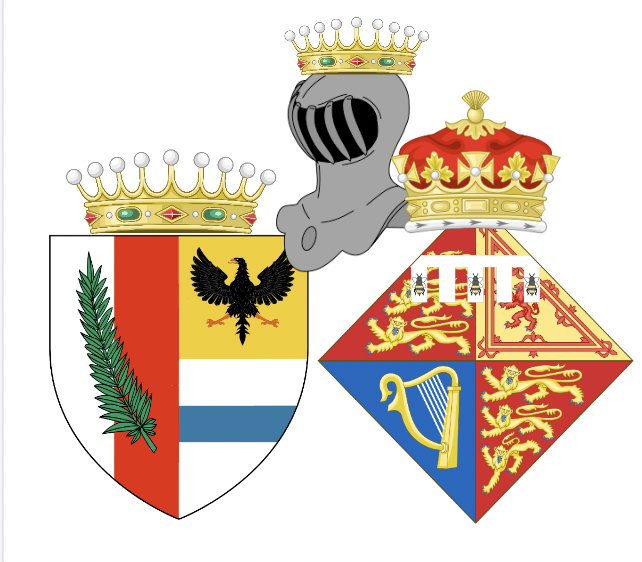
- Joint Coat of Arms
- Date: 17 July 2020; 5 years ago
- Venue: Royal Chapel of All Saints, Royal Lodge, Windsor
- Location: Berkshire, England
- Participants: Princess Beatrice of York; Edoardo Mapelli Mozzi

The wedding of Princess Beatrice of York and Edoardo Mapelli Mozzi took place on 17 July 2020 at the Royal Chapel of All Saints, Royal Lodge, Windsor. The bride, Princess Beatrice of York, is a member of the British royal family. The groom, Edoardo Mapelli Mozzi, is a property developer and member of a family that were part of the Italian nobility. Scheduled for 29 May 2020 at Chapel Royal of St James's Palace, the wedding was delayed due to the COVID-19 pandemic.

== Engagement announcement ==
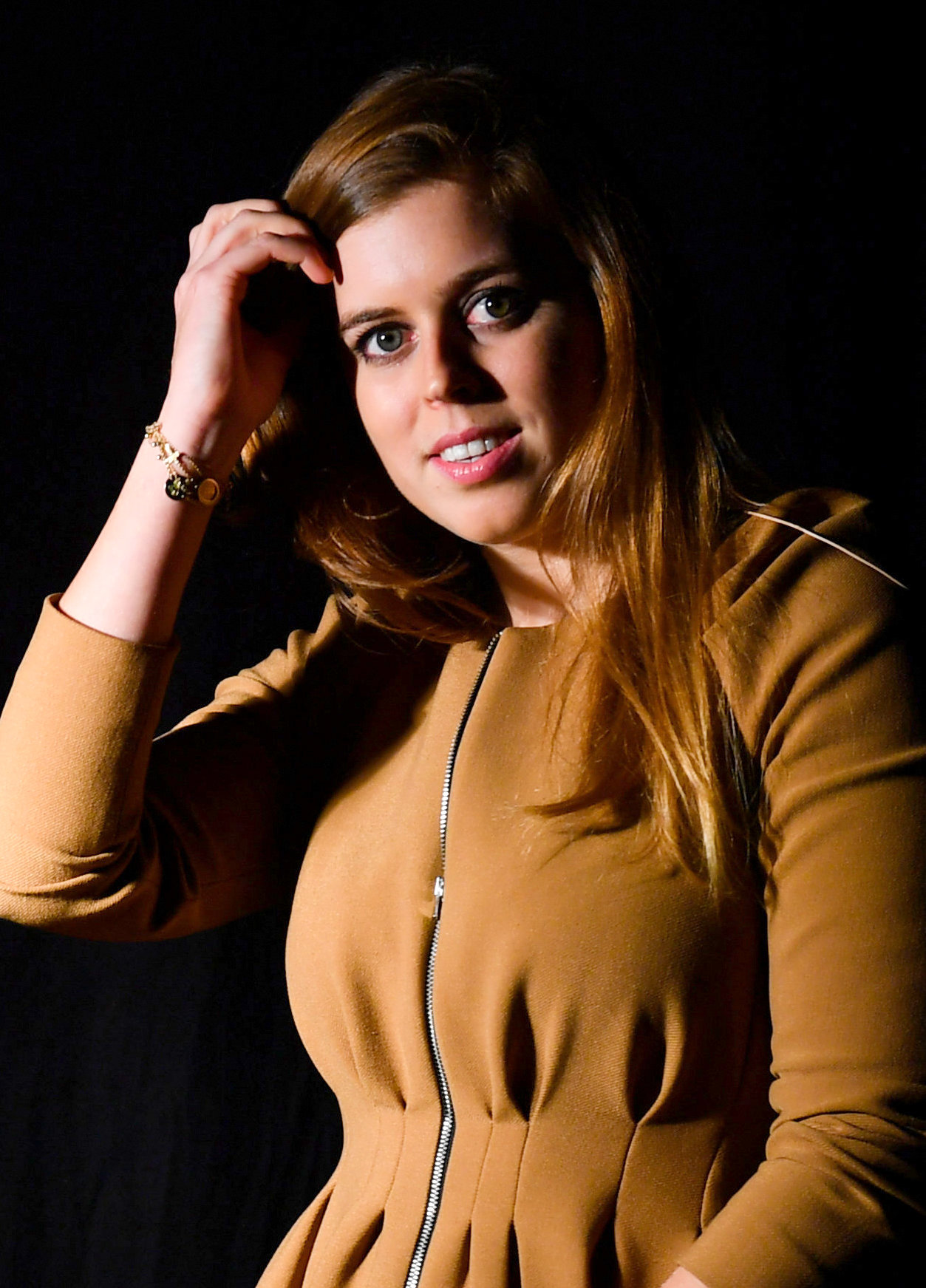
Princess Beatrice in 2018

Princess Beatrice of York is the elder daughter of Andrew Mountbatten-Windsor, formerly Prince Andrew, Duke of York, and Sarah Ferguson. Beatrice is a granddaughter of Queen Elizabeth II. At the time of the engagement announcement, she was ninth in the line of succession to the British throne. Edoardo Mapelli Mozzi is the son of Alex Mapelli-Mozzi, a former British Olympian who represented the country at the 1972 Winter Olympics in alpine skiing events.

The bride and groom have known each other since childhood and their families have been close friends for decades. They began dating in autumn 2018 and became engaged in Italy in September 2019 when Mapelli Mozzi gave the princess a ring designed by Shaun Leane, which has a central round brilliant cut diamond surrounded by tapered baguettes on a platinum pavé-style band. The ring bears a striking similarity to the engagement ring of Princess Beatrice's grandmother the Queen, and is estimated to be worth around $130,000.

Although Beatrice is a member of the British royal family, she did not require the Queen's permission to marry. (Note: Under the Royal Marriages Act 1772, descendants of George II of Great Britain in the line of succession required the consent of the monarch to contract a legally-valid marriage. The restriction was removed under the Succession to the Crown Act 2013, but the latter states that if any of the first six persons in the line of succession marry without the Sovereign's consent, they and their children are removed from the line of succession.) The couple's official engagement announcement was made on 26 September 2019 through the official website of the Duke of York and the official social networks of the royal family. Buckingham Palace also shared a series of official engagement photographs. The colour photographs were taken by Princess Eugenie while the black and white photographs were taken by Misan Harriman at Royal Lodge, Windsor Great Park. For the colour photographs Beatrice wore a Zimmermann green floral dress, and for the black and white photographs she appeared in an Espionage silk dress with a "wrap front silhouette and a flowing asymmetric skirt".

Details about Princess Beatrice's wedding were revealed in February 2020. The engagement was overshadowed by her father's involvement with convicted sex offender Jeffrey Epstein, and later by the abrupt withdrawal of the Duke and Duchess of Sussex from royal duties.

== Wedding ==
On 7 February 2020, it was announced that the Chapel Royal at St James's Palace would be the venue for the wedding ceremony on 29 May, followed by a private reception, given by the Queen, in the gardens of Buckingham Palace. No public money was spent on the event.

=== COVID-19 pandemic ===
Impacted by the COVID-19 pandemic in the United Kingdom, the couple revised their wedding plans, announcing that the private reception at Buckingham Palace would not take place. In accordance with the government advice, they considered holding a smaller ceremony for the sake of older family members who may be at risk and concerns that the groom's extended family may not be able to leave Italy for the ceremony. On 16 April 2020, a spokesperson confirmed that the wedding would be held on a later date, although there were "no plans to switch venues or hold a bigger wedding".

=== Private ceremony ===
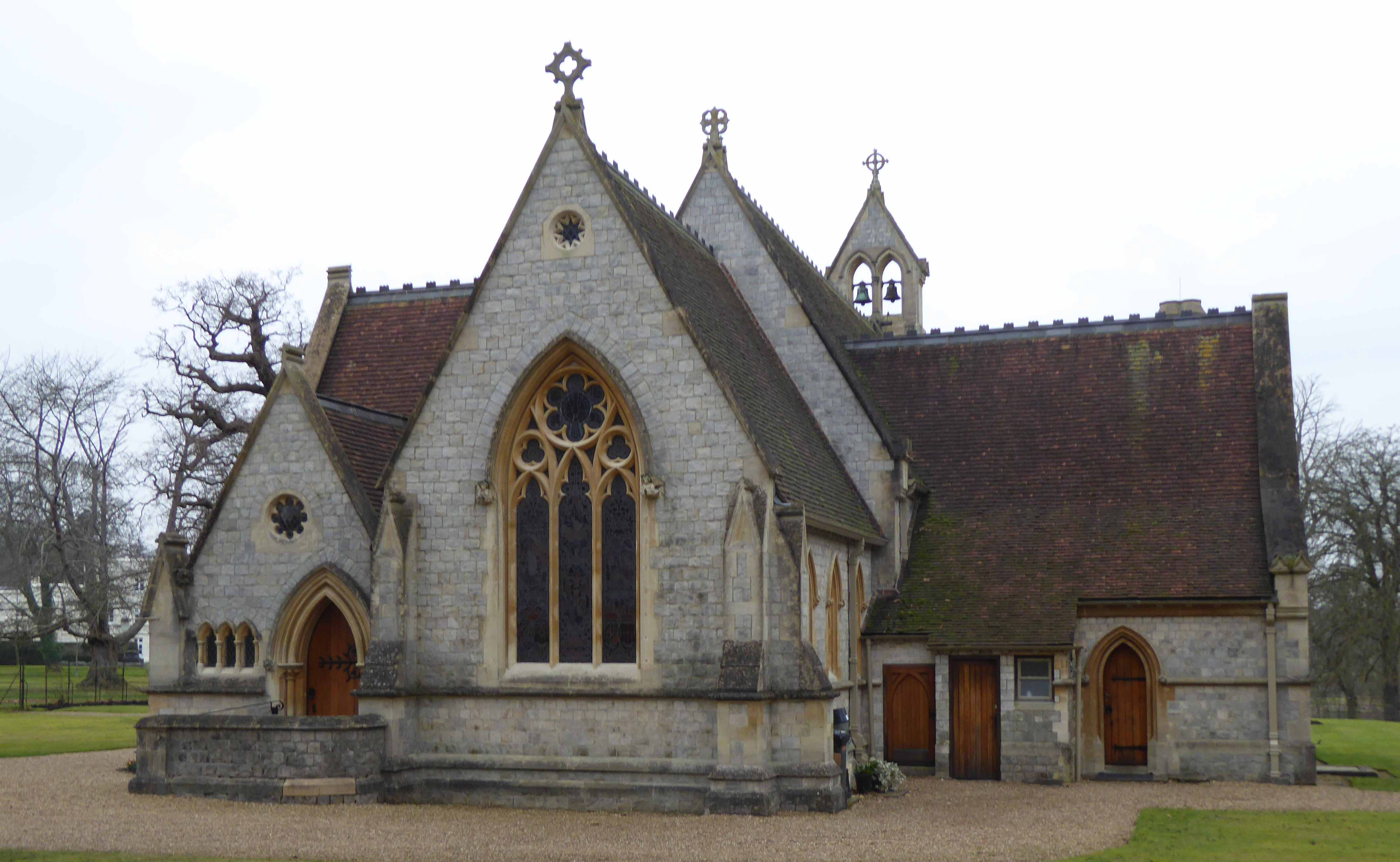
Royal Chapel of All Saints

Princess Beatrice and Edoardo Mapelli Mozzi were married in a private wedding on 17 July 2020 at the Royal Chapel of All Saints, Royal Lodge, Windsor. The Queen and the Duke of Edinburgh were among the 20 family members and close friends in attendance. The ceremony was held within the guidelines enforced by the government during the pandemic. The bride wore a "Peau De Soie taffeta" vintage dress in shades of ivory by Norman Hartnell that belonged to the Queen and was "trimmed with duchess satin and encrusted with diamante". The dress was modified by Angela Kelly and Stewart Parvin to fit the bride for this occasion. The Queen Mary Fringe Tiara secured her veil. The bride wore champagne-coloured satin Valentino shoes, which she had previously worn to the 2011 wedding of her cousin, the Prince of Wales. Her bouquet consisted of "trailing jasmine, pale pink and cream sweet peas, royal porcelain ivory spray roses, pink O'Hara garden roses, pink wax flower, baby pink astilbe, and sprigs of myrtle". After the wedding the bridal bouquet was placed on the Tomb of the Unknown Warrior at Westminster Abbey, following royal tradition that began with the Queen Mother.

The groom's son, Wolfie, served as the best man and page boy and the bride's sister, Princess Eugenie, was matron of honour. The bride proceeded down the aisle escorted by her father, the Duke of York. The Sub-Dean of the Chapel Royal, Paul Wright, and the Honorary Chaplain to the Queen, Martin Poll, officiated as the couple made their marriage vows, and a special wedding licence was prepared by the Archbishop of Canterbury. As laid out by government guidelines, no hymns were sung at the ceremony; however, a selection of music was played and "the National Anthem was played but not sung". Sonnet 116 by William Shakespeare and "i carry your heart with me(i carry it in" by E. E. Cummings were read by the couple's mothers and a reading of 1 Corinthians 13 was also made. Breaking away from the tradition of using Welsh gold, the bride wore a platinum-and-diamond wedding band by Shaun Leane, while the groom opted for a vintage gold band by Josh Collins.

Four official wedding photos taken by Benjamin Wheeler were released in the two days following the ceremony. Two of them were taken in front of the chapel following the wedding service, and the bride's paternal grandparents, the Queen and the Duke of Edinburgh, appeared in one of them at a distance. The ceremony marked the first time that the Queen and Prince Philip had attended a family event after the lockdown. The ceremony was followed by an intimate reception at Royal Lodge, the Duke of York's official residence, to which 14 of the couple's friends were invited. A marquee "filled with sofas, a jukebox, draft beer and a dartboard" was set up outside and guests stayed in glamping pods until the next morning. The Duke of York is said to have delivered a speech at the reception.

=== Guests ===
==== Family of the Bride ====
- The Queen and the Duke of Edinburgh, the bride's paternal grandparents
  - The Duke of York and Sarah, Duchess of York, the bride's parents
    - Princess Eugenie and Jack Brooksbank, the bride's sister and brother-in-law

==== Family of the Groom ====
- Count Wolfie Mapelli Mozzi, the groom's son, best man and page boy
- Count Alex Mapelli Mozzi, the groom's father
  - Countess Natalia Mapelli Mozzi and Tod Yeomans, the groom's sister and brother-in-law
    - Coco Yeomans, the groom's nephew, page boy
    - Freddie Yeomans, the groom's nephew, page boy
- Nikki Shale and David Williams-Ellis, the groom's mother and stepfather

== See also ==
- List of royal weddings
