= Società per azioni =

Italian term of company with shares

Società per azioni (Italian: [sotʃeˈta pper atˈtsjoːni]; abbr. S.p.A. [ˌɛssepiˈa]) is a form of corporation in Italy and San Marino, meaning 'company with shares' (although often translated as 'joint-stock company', which may or may not be a limited liability entity). It is more or less equivalent to S.A. or public limited company (PLC) in other countries.

The other common form of corporation in Italy is società a responsabilità limitata (S.r.l.) ('limited liability company'). S.p.A. issued shares (Italian: azioni), while in S.r.l. the unit was quote/stock of share capital. Moreover, the articles of association of S.r.l. allowed different allocation of profit and assets, which was more comparable to a limited partnership.

Throughout Italy's history, the governance of S.p.A. has been remodeled several times. Originally the S.p.A. was governed by the Commercial Code of 1865, and subsequently by that of 1883, under the name "società anonima" ('anonymous company'). The regulations contained within the civil code remained unaltered until the 2003 Company Law Reform. The regulations in effect are set out in the Italian Civil Code of 1942, which also adopted the name currently in use. Within the civil code, the articles specifically addressing S.p.A. are found in Articles 2325-2510 of Book V, Title V.

Since 2016, banks are required to run as S.p.A. if their assets are more than a defined threshold. This saw the blue chips of the FTSE MIB Index: Banco BPM, BPER Banca, UBI Banca, demutualized from S.c.p.a., S.c. a.r.l., or S.c. legal forms (respectively, co-operative company by shares, co-operative company with limited liability, and co-operative company).

As a legal form, the S.p.A. has five characteristics that are always present and universally recognized: legal personality, limited liability, transferable shares, ownership by shareholders, and management by a board of directors on behalf of the shareholders. On account of these characteristics, an S.p.A. can raise large amounts of capital by incentivizing many investors to buy its shares, making the S.p.A. suitable for large undertakings. Accordingly, the S.p.A. is the legal form in which large companies typically operate all over the world.

== Fundamental features ==
The elements that characterize this type of company and are essential to be able to apply the legislation relating to this institution are:

- The intent to limit risk.
- The presence of shares representing the shareholding of the shareholders in the company.^{p. 159}
- The minimum amount of share capital not less than €50,000 (art. 2327 of the Civil Code, as recently amended by Legislative Decree 91/2014).^{p. 160}
- The normative corporation: the legislator imposes that the powers are rigidly distributed among different bodies.

If one of these elements is missing, the case is not considered integrated, and therefore the regulations of the SpA are not applicable. Due to these characteristics (high capital and public sale of shares), the S.p.A. is the only joint-stock company allowed to exercise insurance activity (art. 14 letter a Legislative Decree 209/2005) and the exercise of banking activity (art. 14 letter a Legislative Decree 385/1993).

== See also ==
- Aktiengesellschaft – the legal form of company in Germany, commonly used in the German translation of Italian companies in German-speaking autonomous regions
- Società a responsabilità limitata – limited liability company in Italy and San Marino
