= Società a responsabilità limitata =

Type of company under Italian law

Società a responsabilità limitata (S.r.l. or Srl) is a type of legal corporate entity in San Marino and Italy, which literally means (but is not entirely equal to) 'limited liability company'. It has a similar form to società sportiva dilettantistica a responsabilità limitata (S.s.d a r.l.) for amateur sports-related companies and their corresponding regulations: article 90 of the Italian Law No.289 of 2002.

Differing from società per azioni (S.p.A.), S.r.l. may not issue shares that have par value, but only the quota (Italian: quote) or units of the share capital. Moreover, the articles of association of S.r.l. allowed different allocations of profits and assets, which was more comparable to a limited partnership. A fourth form of corporate entity, società cooperativa a responsabilità limitata (S.c.r.l. or S.c. a r.l.), was seen in the cooperatives of Italy.

== History ==
The società a responsabilità limitata was introduced into the Italian legal system with the Civil Code of 1942—previously, there was a joint-stock company by shares, which did not differ much from other joint-stock companies. The aim was to create a legal form that stood between partnerships and joint-stock companies. However, this goal was not fully achieved, as the società a responsabilità limitata lacked a proper autonomous discipline, a gap that was addressed by referring to that of the società per azioni.

Furthermore, the financial structure was quite limited, making the società a responsabilità limitata prone to the phenomenon of nominal undercapitalization. This was because the issuance of bonds was prohibited, and there was a ban on issuing special shares (all shares were equal and granted equal rights). The phenomenon of the so-called "financing by the partner" intensified, involving a loan from a partner to the company. This loan did not result in a capital increase and led the partner to play the dual role of a shareholder and a creditor. The negative effect was that what could have been a capital increase benefiting creditors (e.g., in the event of the insolvency of the company) instead became a concurrent debt with the claims of creditors.

The corporate form of the società a responsabilità limitata underwent significant innovation through the corporate law reform of 2003. Now, the società a responsabilità limitata, equipped with its autonomous discipline, appears as an intermediate and "hybrid" model between the società per azioni and partnerships. Some elements, such as the complete waiver of the principle of patrimonial liability under Art. 2740 of the Civil Code, bring it closer to the società per azioni. Simultaneously, other factors, such as organizational flexibility or the personality of the shares, are typical of partnerships. This raises an interpretative issue regarding which legal framework to use to fill any gaps in the società a responsabilità limitata model.
