= Dara Huang =

American architect

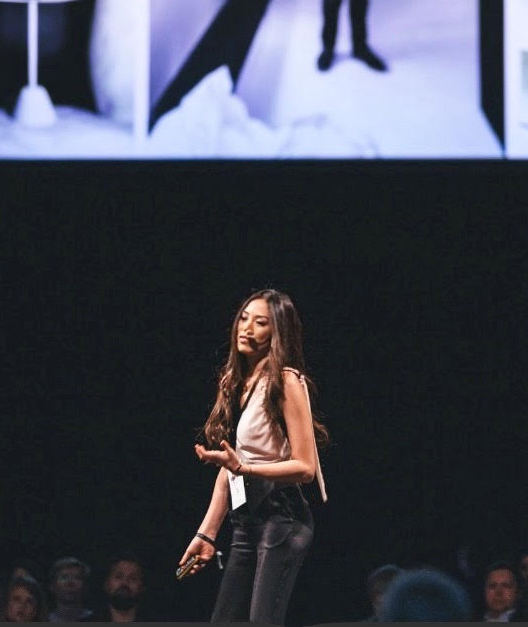
- Born: 1982 or 1983 (age 42–43); Florida, U.S.
- Citizenship: United States; United Kingdom (from 2022)
- Education: University of Florida (BA); Harvard University (MA)
- Occupations: Architect; businesswoman
- Partner: Edoardo Mapelli Mozzi (2015–2018)
- Children: 1
- Practice: Design Haus Liberty

Dara Huang (born 1981) is an American architect based in London. In 2013, she founded the architecture and design firm Design Haus Liberty. She is the co-founder of Dara Maison with J. Christopher Burch, a furniture and interiors brand. Huang is a survivor of the 2008 Mumbai attacks. Huang's son, Christopher Woolf Mapelli Mozzi, is the stepson of Princess Beatrice.

== Family and education ==
Dara Huang was born in Florida to Taiwanese American immigrants. Her father is a retired NASA rocket scientist. She attended the University of Florida, from which she graduated in 2004 with a Bachelor of Arts in design. She was a member of Alpha Delta Pi sorority. She then earned a master's degree in architecture from Harvard University. Huang was engaged to Edoardo Mapelli Mozzi, with whom she has a son, Christopher Woolf "Wolfie", born in 2016. The engagement was broken off in 2018.

== Career ==
After graduating, Huang worked at architectural firms Herzog & de Meuron in Switzerland and Foster and Partners in London. At these firms she worked on several large projects, including the skyscraper 56 Leonard Street in New York City, Tate Modern in London, and Manolo Blahnik stores around the world. Huang has received several awards, including The Clifford Wong Prize, The KPF Travelling Fellowship, The Young Architects Award, and first place in the AIAS National Design Review. In 2026, Huang was briefly a cast member on the Bravo reality television series, Ladies of London.

=== Design Haus Liberty ===
In 2013, Huang opened her own architecture practice, Design Haus Liberty, in Clerkenwell, London. Its work has been exhibited at Somerset House in London and the Venice Biennale of Architecture.
