= History of Italian citizenship =

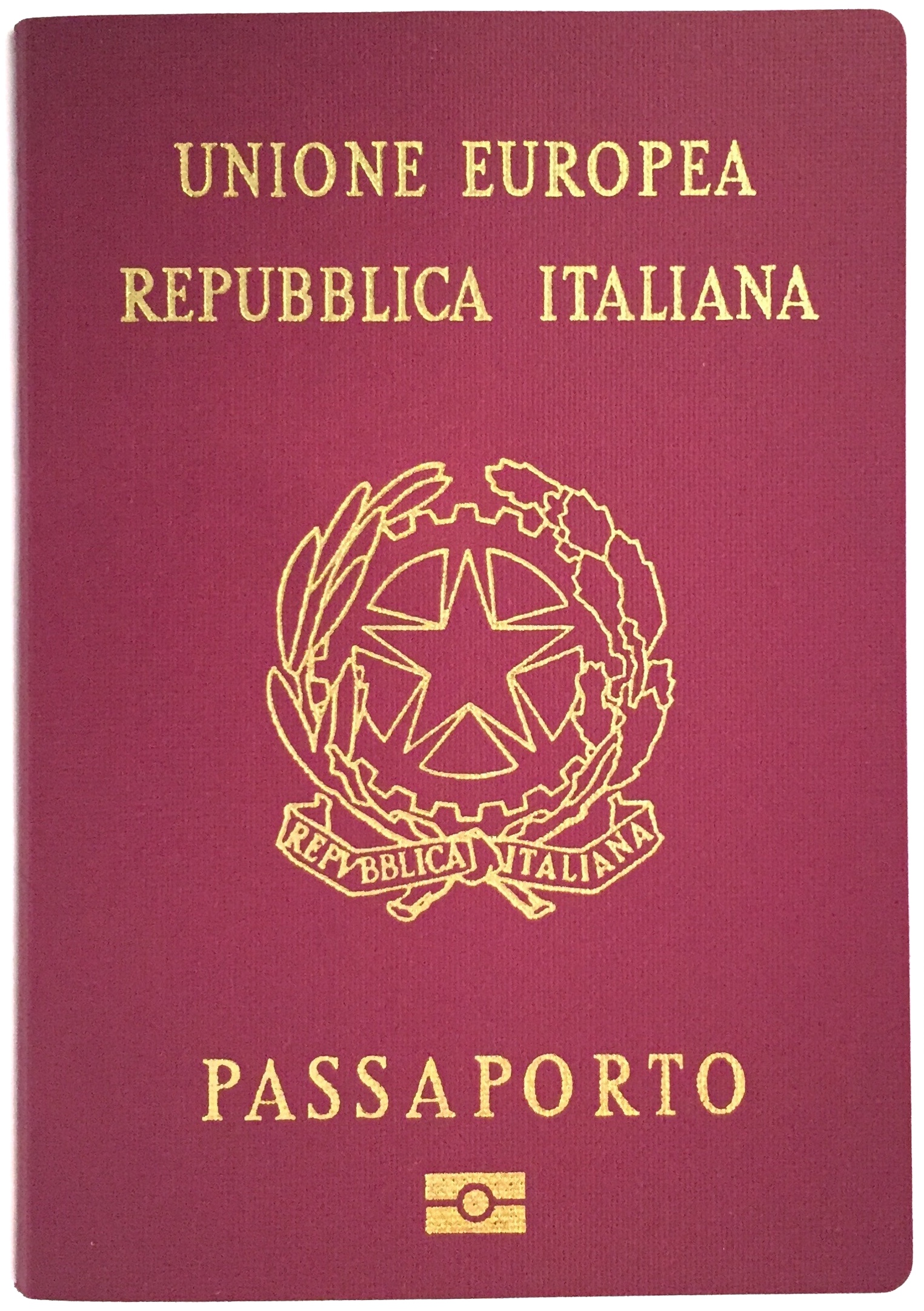
Italian passport

This article deals primarily with the nature of Italian citizenship from the time of unification to the present. It is concerned with the civil, political, and social rights and obligations of Italian nationals and addresses how these rights and obligations have been changed or manipulated throughout the last two centuries.

== Italian national identity before 1861 ==
In the Middle Ages, the Italian Peninsula was split into five large and small sovereign states that were subsequently subdivided into several smaller, semi-autonomous, mini-states. In the early 19th century, Napoleonic conquests resulted in French control over most of Italy.

This 14-year period of Napoleonic rule is substantial to Italian self-recognition, because the administration of the French influenced Italians into entertaining the idea of a constituted Italian nation state. The repressive nature of this era also acted to engender a new generation of Italian national revolutionaries. One of which was Giuseppe Mazzini, known as a founder of the Risorgimento. Mazzini saw Italian nationality as inclusive: “For Mazzini, all Italians, irrespective of class and property, were impoverished and oppressed, and all were therefore included in his notion of 'the people'”

The key figure in the independence and initial unification of Italy was Count Camillo Benso di Cavour. Cavour wanted to create a modern secular state but without the characteristic social upheaval of revolution. Cavour and his supporters decided this could be done by limiting popular participation and unifying Italy with the consent of the Major Powers. Cavour also wished to limit enfranchisement, within the new Italy, to "men of substance." Cavour thought it most practical to control the definition of Italian Nationality, as well as the politics of the Italian Nation, from the top down.

== First constitution ==
The first Italian constitution was created through the adaptation of the Piedmontese Statuto Albertino of 1848. Most of the Statuto were either copied from the French constitutional charter of 1840 or the Spanish constitution of 1812. The Piedmontese Statuto was originally drafted in French. To this day the statute remains officially un-repealed in Italy, though it is not used in present-day practice.

== After Italian unification ==
=== Storica's ===
The Destra Storica (Historical Right) completed the territorial unification of Italy, centralized its administration, and established an effective system of tax collection. It was repressive of popular movements, but respected the liberties of individuals, to think, speak, and write.

The Sinistra Storica (Historical Left) replaced the Destra Storica parliament. This period was characterized by low levels of enfranchisement among nationals. Less than 2% of the population was entitled to vote, until 1882 when the figure rose to 7%. There were only half a million male voters, and these were mostly dominated by a few thousand influential figures.

=== Giovanni Giolitti and voter expansion ===
Following the fall of the Sinistra Storica parliament, Italian national politics were firmly controlled by Giovanni Giolitti; his position in government remained predominant from 1903 to 1914. Giolitti's regime most notably created a major electoral reform law, which increased voters from 3 million to 8.5 million. Previous to Giollitti, in 1882, the number of enfranchised was limited because there was an educational test for voters. Soldiers, sailors, and police officers also were, oddly enough, excluded from enfranchisement. Under Giolitti, however, the Vatican decided to hesitantly support the Italian state; finally making it possible for “good Catholics” to vote in elections, following 1903. This combined with increasing literacy led to 30% of the male adult population becoming eligible to vote in national elections. Universal manhood suffrage followed later, in 1912. In 1919 illiterate voters, who comprised about 50% of the population, were able to take part in elections by depositing unmarked ballot papers bearing their party emblem into the ballot box.

== Italian fascist conceptualization of nationality ==
=== La Voce ===
The nationalism of la Voce came to fruition under the authoritative Giolitti government. The movement is considered to be influential on, although not directly related to, the development of fascism. The greatest contrast between the thoughts of La Voce and the ideology of fascism occurs in the la voce belief that the myth of regeneration of politics was not associated with the myth of the supremacy of the state, nation, and race. In contrast, the Vociani wanted national regeneration through civic humanism and the faith of a secular religion that could “educate the moral conscience for the modern ‘New Italian’ harmonizing the need for a strong sense of national identity with the aspiration of attaining a higher universal conscience, above and beyond that of nationalism.”

=== Fascist conception of nationality ===
Futurism and the La Voce movement eventually would come together to lay a foundation for the creation of Italian Fascism; in which the status of the national would be redefined yet again. The Fascist’s ideal citizen was a “new man” devoid of any individual autonomy and responsibility who was taught to see himself merely as an instrument of the state. This “new man” also had to be prepared to sacrifice his life for his nation. The Italian National Fascist Party, or PNF, achieved this through sanctifying politics, “integrating the masses into the nation through the use of faith based rituals and symbols centered on a new fascist religion.”

The Italian Fascists also claimed a monopoly over the representation of “Italianness”; an Italian national was defined by his participation in the PNF. As a result, the liberal nationalist ideal which incorporated all Italians into the state; despite religion, ethnicity or ideology, was swept away by the totalitarian state ideal. Only Fascists were considered "True Italians" and only these individuals were granted a "Complete Citizenship." Those who did not swear allegiance to the Fascist party were banned from public life. The PNF also initiated a large propaganda program engendering Italian identity to Italian emigrants and nationals abroad; in the hopes of promoting the fascist cause among former nationals through the promotion of a fascist version of Italian nationalism.

=== Fascist syndicate system ===
The Fascist party, between 1926 and 1928, created a corporative system of representation and negotiation where equality between citizens was rejected (made official in the Charter of Labor of 1927) and citizens were arranged based on economic categorization within syndicates. The rights of individuals were, therefore, superseded by the rights of the syndicate. Each employer and employee were merged to form a labor syndicate that was placed into one of six larger national categories; for national representation. Intellectual workers were placed in a special category. It was within the syndicates that requests for improved working conditions and higher wages were petitioned and decided upon with the state acting only as the final judge. In order to join a work syndicate one had to pay dues to the syndicate and become a member of the Fascist Party. The national electorate was adapted to this new system so all voters were now, under fascism, male Italian citizens over the age of twenty one who belonged to a syndicate and were members of the fascist party. A citizen's power to vote, therefore, was granted based on the fulfillment of a social function. Belonging to a syndicate provided evidence of an individual's contribution to the state while simultaneously, through obligation in membership, made sure that all voting citizens were members of the Fascist Party.

== Fascist discrimination ==
=== Julian March ===
As a result of First World War peace process, Italy was forced to incorporate Slovene and Croatian-speaking sections of the Habsburg Empire into Italy. This new region was referred to as “Venezia Giulia.” Under fascist rule this north eastern border was specifically targeted for the violent enforcement of an Italian national identity.

However, harsh assimilatory treatment of minorities in the area existed months before fascists marched on parliament. Previous to fascist control Slavs in the area were treated as an alien group and this categorization translated into specific anti-Slav policies prohibiting the use of Slovene in government institutions and law courts.

Following the Fascist takeover the legislative integration of Julian March into Italy began, which formally occurred in 1922. By 1923 Topnomy laws reinvented the identities of these provinces; Slavic street names and monuments were changed to celebrate and promote Italian contemporary persons. By 1924 the integration of the Slavic community of Julian March was further intensified as all foreign language newspapers were required to publish Italian translations and schools were prohibited from teaching in foreign languages. Assimilating policies, however, were most aggressive between the years 1924–1927. It was during these years that policies were formally put in place discriminating against Slavic Minorities. Examples include the transformation of 500 Slovene and Croatian primary schools into Italian language schools, as well as the deportation of one thousand Slavic teachers to other parts of Italy, and the formal closure of 500 Slav societies and a number of Slavic libraries. Slav surnames were also replaced by Italianized versions. Eventually all evidence of non-Italian names, even on old gravestones, were destroyed. Houses were searched for foreign language literature and alien cultural and athletic organizations were purged of non-Italian content. Finally land and property were confiscated from Slovene peasant farmers and redistributed to new Italian settlers.

=== Jewish exclusion under fascism ===
In November 1938 the Italian fascist government introduced laws aimed specifically against the Italian Jewish community. These laws prohibited all Jews, regardless of their political loyalty to fascism, from participating in schools, commerce, professions or politics. This exclusion was also actively used, during the last five years of the fascist government, in a propaganda program to educate the Italian population to the biological understanding of Italian national identity. This propaganda campaign detailed the biological threat of Jews and other non-Europeans such as Africans to the purity of the Italian race.

== Italy after fascism ==
The failure of fascism is often associated with the ruined prestige of the Italian national identity. Since the fifties and sixties the loss of national prestige seems to have grown as some scholars presently maintain that Italian nationals have already lost, or are in the process of losing, their sense of national identity. This loss of national identity can be witnessed in the present-day growth of Piccolo Patria (local patriotism); where national identity is being replaced by regional patriotism. This has led to divisive movements such as the separatist movement of the Northern League of Italy. However the strength of regional patriotism has also positively affected the ease with which Italian Nationals have entered the European Union. It is a popular paradox to say that “Italians are the most regional yet at the same time the most European” of all individuals within the EU. The retention of a strong regional identity is seen as corresponding with a weaker notion of state and national identity. As a result, Italians are able to view participation in the EU as non-threatening to national consciousness in contrast to fellow Europeans; who place a greater importance on retaining a unique national identity.

== Modern Italian constitutional distinctiveness ==
Italy's ultimate law is found in its constitution, created in 1948 following the fascist downfall, where sovereignty belongs to citizens who elect a parliament. This Italian constitution is not original in its obligation to safeguard basic and fundamental human rights. However the Italian constitution is distinctive in the sense that it formally guarantees, under article 24, the right to a judicial defense. The Italian constitution is also distinctive, from some other constitutions, in its outlawing of the death penalty, pursuant to article 27. This indicates that the state sees rehabilitation of a convicted person as an obligation; and rehabilitation through treatment as a right of the Italian citizen.

== Language rights and discrimination in Italian national history ==
The Italian language has been considered an important characteristic of Italian national identity since the time of unification. It was the overwhelming use of regional dialects and foreign languages that lead non-Italian speaking minorities to be considered a threat to the development of national consciousness. As a result of this the first eighty or ninety years of Italian history characterizes non-Italian speaking minorities as intruders in the national domain; who were to be given no official existence. This is significant once it is considered that the Italian state began its life in 1861 without a common language. Most of the population could not speak, what is today considered, Italian. Out of a population of 35 million at least 31 million were not included in the, not-so, common language.

When the fascist regime came to power Italian still was the spoken language of very few Italian nationals. Fascists confronted this obstruction to national unity by discriminating and banning the use of foreign language forms. French and English were particularly singled out as polluting the Italian national language. As a result, laws were created aimed at preventing the use of foreign words on shop signs and Italian alternatives were created to take the place of regularly used foreign words. This repression of foreign languages went so far as to prompt Fascist Party member Tommaso Tittoni, on 16 August 1926 to call upon Benito Mussolini to send government representatives around newspaper offices to catch out and sack linguistic offenders.

The direct result of this linguistic repression culminated in the development of a new constitutional law, included in the January 1 constitution of 1948, which carried a reference to linguistic equality. It stated that “all Italian citizens have equal social dignity and are equal before the law, without distinction of sex, race, language, religion, political opinions, personal, or social condition” and also that “the republic will protect linguistic minorities with appropriate measures.”

Recently, and in complete contradiction to past trends, a multicultural approach to language rights has also developed as a proposed law on language was passed by Italian parliament on December 15, 1999. This law formally protected the use of thirteen minority languages for use in education, broadcasting and administration.

== Civil Law ==
Italy has, since unification, invoked the use of two civil codes. The first was the Italian Civil Code of 1865 which was used up until it was made obsolete by the second Italian Civil Code, which was formally created and put to use in 1942.

=== Italian Civil Code ===
The Italian Civil Code of 1865 was formally adopted by Italy following unification. The Civil Code of 1865 was similar to the Napoleonic Code. The fundamental principles, of both the Napoleonic code and 1865 Italian Civil Code, indicated that all male citizens were equal before the law: primogeniture, hereditary nobility, and class privileges were to be extinguished; civilian institutions were to be emancipated from ecclesiastical control; and freedom of person, freedom of contract, and inviolability of private property were to be placed under the formal protection of Civil Law.

The modern Italian Civil Code (promulgated in 1942) contains 2969 articles and is divided into six books categorized under the headings Persons and Family, Succession, Property Obligations, Labor, and Protection of Rights. The Civil Code was adopted in 1942 whereas the Penal Code and the Code of Criminal Procedure have been formally used by Italy since 1931. However all of these codes have since been extensively amended and the Code of Criminal Procedure has undergone significant modification based on decisions made in the Italian Constitutional Court. In 1988 a new Code of Criminal Procedure was adopted in realization of the constitutional principles.

=== Female exclusion from civil rights ===
Under the Civil Code of 1865 women were formally categorized based, almost exclusively, on the nature of their relationship with an Italian male. Women, as a result, as a group were denied the privilege of civil rights. Women were excluded from political and administrative suffrage, were not allowed to hold any public office, and barred from representing civil state authority. As a result of these limitations women were banned from holding several jobs and lacked access to certain privileges. For instance women, under the original civil code of 1865, were not allowed to become arbitrators, notaries, lawyers, judges, or guardians to individuals unless directly connected through blood. Over the process of time woman did gain civil rights equal to men, however, this was a long drawn out process. In 1919, women gained the right to own property and the right to control their income, while also being given access to a handful of legal positions. 26 years later, in 1945, women received the right to vote in elections. Finally, in 1975, reforms were introduced and enacted that brought about a legal change to the distribution of power between the sexes in marriage, which had formerly held an incredibly masculine bias.

=== Citizenship ===
In the Italian Civil Code's amended legislation of 1992 there are three types of citizens that are recognized as citizens at birth.

- The child of a citizen father or mother
- Those who were born in the territory of the Republic if both parents are unknown or stateless persons, or if the child does not follow the citizenship of the parents under the law of the State to which the parents belong.
- The child of unknown parents found in the territory of the Republic is considered a citizen by birth, unless possession of another citizenship is proved.

There is also a provision in Italian Civil Law which states that all adopted aliens automatically acquire citizenship

For the most part aliens residing in Italy can gain access to citizenship in one of four ways. The first is through engaging in active military service for the Italian state. The Second is by taking public employment from the state, within the republic or abroad. The third is by residing in the territory of the republic for at least two years prior to reaching majority and declaring, within one year of this date, that one wishes to acquire Italian Citizenship. The Fourth is through legally residing for at least 6 months in the territory of the republic before marrying an Italian citizen. This fourth kind of citizenship is lost however upon annulment, divorce, or legal separation. There are also certain provisions that bar an alien from attaining Italian citizenship upon marriage. These provisions are for the most part criminal misconduct. If the future wife or husband has committed a crime of considerable degree, or poses a threat to the nation at large, then they will be barred from formal entry.

Italian citizenship is lost when a citizen is publicly or militarily in the employment of a foreign nation or international entity with which the Italian state refuses to acknowledge. This loss of citizenship, however, is prefaced by a warning issued by the Italian state urging the Italian citizen to give up their public or military position within an allotted amount of time. During war-time this provision is made much more important as any citizen publicly, or militarily, employed within a state at odds with Italy is essentially forced to give up their citizenship.

== Bibliography ==
- Eric Hobsbawm and Terence Ranger (ed.), The invention of tradition, Cambridge: Cambridge University Press, 1984
- Aldo Schiavone, Italiani senza Italia, Torino: Einaudi, 1998
- Remo Bodei, Il Noi diviso, Torino: Einaudi, 1998
- Ernesto Galli della Loggia, L'identità italiana, Bologna: il Mulino, 1998
- Guido Crainz, Il paese mancato : dal miracolo economico agli anni Ottanta, Roma: Donzelli, 2003
- Stefano Jossa, L'Italia letteraria, Bologna: il Mulino, 2006
