= Luigi Mozzi =

Italian Jesuit (1746–1813)

Monsignor Luigi Mozzi de' Capitani (26 May 1746, Bergamo – 24 June 1813, Piacenza) was an 18th-century aristocratic Italian Jesuit, theologian and controversialist, who served as Archpriest of Bergamo (1792–1797).

== Family ==
Scion of an ancient Florentine patrician family, seated at the Villa Mozzi near Ponte San Pietro in Lombardy, he was the youngest son of Count Giambattista Mozzi (1709–1746) and Concordia Zanchi.

His elder surviving brother was Count Enrico Mozzi (1733–1800), whose granddaughter and eventual heiress Angela Mozzi married Girolamo Mapelli (1785–1842).

== Life ==
Mozzi entered the Society of Jesus in 1763, and on its suppression was received into the diocese of Bergamo, being appointed prosynodal examiner of candidates for the priesthood and elected a canon of the cathedral chapter, then promoted archpriest in 1792. The zeal with which he opposed the progress of Jansenism in Italy earned him a reputation, with Pope Pius VI calling him to Rome, where he was appointed an Apostolic prefect.

Elected a member of the Accademia degli Arcadi, in 1804, Mozzi rejoined the Jesuit Order which had been restored in Naples, before retiring to the Palazzo Scotti, residence of his kinsman Gaetano Scotti Douglas, marchese di Vigoleno, where he died.

== Works ==
Among Mozzi's important writings are:

- Vera idea del Giansenismo (Bergamo, 1781)
- Storia compendiosa dello Scisma della nuova Chiesa d'Utrecht (Ferrara, 1785)
- Storia delle Revoluzioni della Chiesa d'Utrecht (Venice, 1787)
- Compendio storico-cronologico...sopra il Baianismo, Giansenismo e Quesnellismo (Foligno, 1792),
  all against Jansenism;
- Il falso discepolo di S. Agostino e di S. Tommaso (Venice, 1779), a defence of Molinism.

Mozzi also translated from English "Fifty Reasons for preferring the Roman Catholic Religion" by Duke Anthony Ulrich of Brunswick-Wolfenbüttel (Bassano, 1789); and from French "Les projets des incredules pour la ruine de la religion, dévoilés dans les œuvres de Frédéric, roi de Prusse" (Assisi, 1791).

== See also ==
- Bergamo Cathedral
- Villa Mapelli Mozzi
