= Royal Chapel of All Saints =

Coordinates: 51°26′23.22″N 0°36′17.47″W

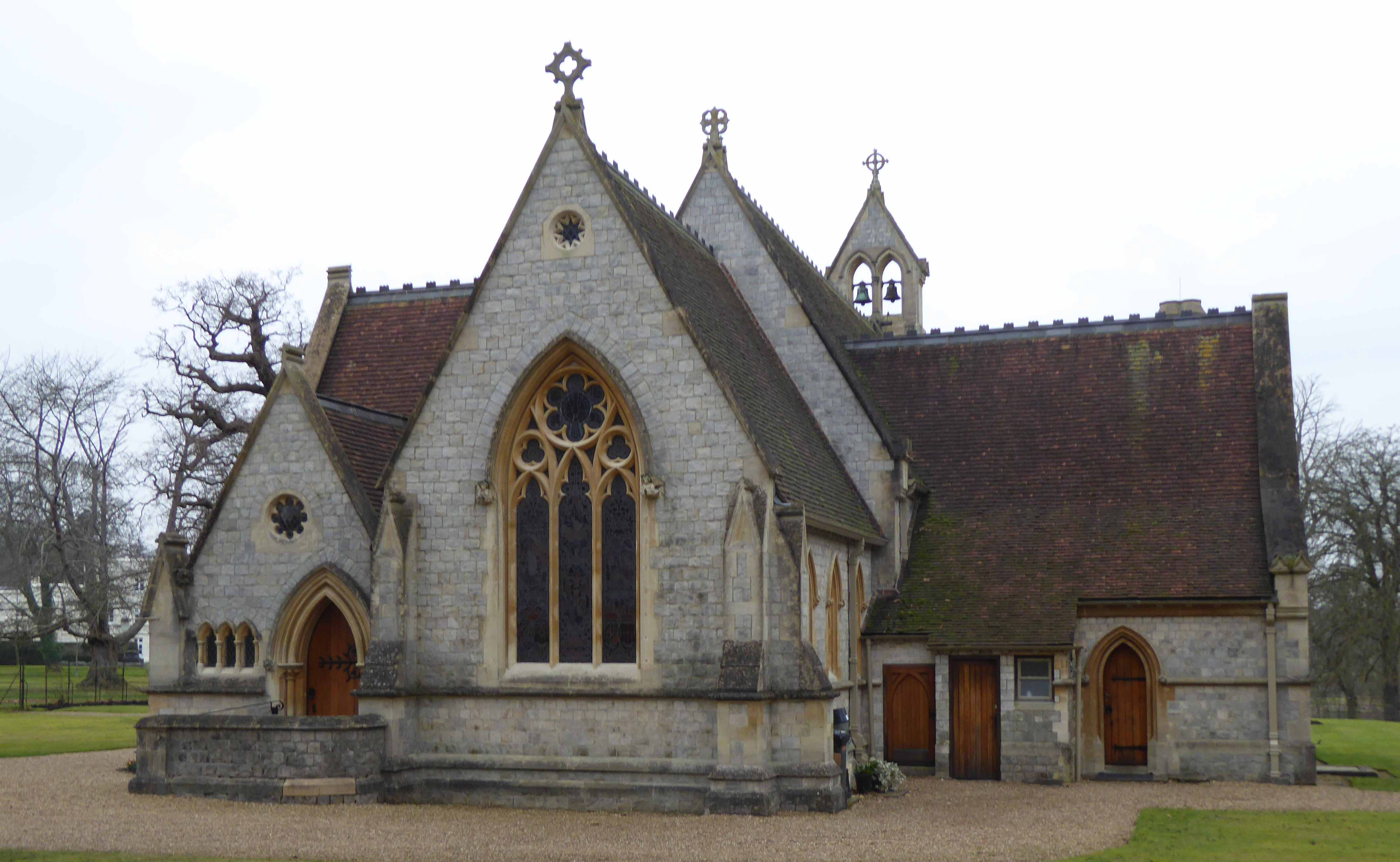
- Royal Chapel of All Saints
- Denomination: Church of England
- Churchmanship: High church
- Website: www.stgeorges-windsor.org

History
- Dedication: All Saints

Administration
- Province: None - royal peculiar
- Deanery: Dean of Windsor

The Royal Chapel of All Saints, also known colloquially as Queen Victoria's Chapel is a Grade II listed church in the grounds of the Royal Lodge in Windsor Great Park, Berkshire, England and is a royal peculiar, serving as an informal parish church for the inhabitants and staff of the Windsor Great Park. Services at the chapel are often attended by members of the British royal family, and Queen Elizabeth II regularly worshipped at the church for reasons of privacy. The chaplaincy of the Royal Chapel All Saints is held by one of the Canons of the College of St George at St George's Chapel, Windsor Castle.

== History ==
The chapel is the successor to the chapels built at Royal Lodge and Cumberland Lodge for the use of their royal occupants and their staff. By the mid-1820s, George IV frequently resided at Royal Lodge during his refurbishment of Windsor Castle, and a larger chapel was required for the worship of his household and staff. The chapel was built by Jeffry Wyatville, the architect of the King's works at Windsor Castle, and first used on Palm Sunday in 1825.

The Treasury was informed of the chapel's construction by Wyatville two weeks after it was inaugurated. It had been built without the permission of the Treasury, and as a "matter of unavoidable necessity". Wyatville described the chapel as having been built "within an old building", the older building has been described as a Porter's Lodge, which had been previously described at the location of the chapel.

Repairs were carried out to the chapel in September 1825, and a few months later more repairs were required when the King tripped after leaving his pew. £200 was allocated by the Treasury for further repairs in December 1825. With the accession of William IV, the greater part of Royal Lodge was demolished, but the chapel survived, and held services for the "benefit of servants of the Park Establishment."

Queen Victoria occasionally attended services in the chapel, and recorded a visit in March 1842, remarking "Everyone joined in the singing, which I so much like. Afterwards we walked to the Royal Lodge, and in the garden which is very pretty..."

Francis Seymour gave the chapel a new organ upon becoming Marquess of Hertford, having previously been the Deputy Ranger of the park. A window dedicated to Prince Christian Victor of Schleswig-Holstein, the son of Prince Christian and Princess Helena was dedicated in 1905. Prince and Princess Christian lived at Cumberland Lodge.

The Duke and Duchess of York lived at Royal Lodge from 1931 and became regular worshippers at the chapel. They continued to visit after they became King George VI and Queen Elizabeth. George VI refurbished the chapel, installing a new ceiling designed by Edward Maufe, renewing the pews, and adding a cover to the organ, designed by Harry Stuart Goodhart-Rendel.

As Queen Mother, Elizabeth returned to live at Royal Lodge as a widow, and regularly visited the chapel until her death at the lodge in 2002. Her coffin lay before the altar of the chapel before being taken to London for her lying in state in Westminster Hall and funeral. Her daughter, Queen Elizabeth II, was also a regular member of the chapel's congregation.

On 17 July 2020, Princess Beatrice married Edoardo Mapelli Mozzi at the chapel. The wedding was held privately, and confirmed by Buckingham Palace after the nuptials.

Watercolours of the chapel were painted in the 1830s by Henry Bryan Ziegler, and by Hugh Casson in 1990.

== Design ==
The exterior of the chapel has been described as a "fairly unremarkable exercise in neo-gothic." It has been compared to another nearby church in the Gothic Revival style, St John the Baptist Church, Windsor, designed by Charles Hollis in 1820 with assistance from Wyatville.

A contemporaneous guidebook described the chapel as "a small structure fitted up with appropriate simplicity; its principal ornament being the window above the altar, representing our Saviour casting out devils." An organ called "Handel's organ" was installed in the chapel shortly before the death of George IV.

The seating within the chapel was designed to reflect the hierarchy among parishioners. The Royal Pew was to the right of the altar, adjoined by a pew for royal servants, both pews sharing a separate Royal Entrance. The royal pews were faced by a pew for the Deputy Surveyor of Woods. Pews in a side chapel on the left were for the Bailiff, the King's Farmer, and park keepers. Labourers were seated on the ground floor and first floor, within the chapel's Common Entrance. Increased seating was added in the 1840s due to an enlargement of the staff at Cumberland Lodge, the plans for extra seating being approved by Prince Albert, and more seating was added in the 1850s.

After Victoria's mother, Victoria, Duchess of Kent, died in March 1861, Victoria and Albert commissioned a window for the chapel's chancel in her memory. The chancel was enlarged at the same time to designs by Samuel Sanders Teulon and Anthony Salvin. Teulon's works added 46 seats to the chapel, and the new chapel was consecrated by the Bishop of Oxford, Samuel Wilberforce, in November 1863.

The chapel required yet more seating by 1865, but the Commissioner of Woods, Charles Gore, was apprehensive about re-employing Teulon to remodel the chapel. He considered the style of Teulon's new chancel incompatible with the old chapel building's design. Writing to the Keeper of the Privy Purse, Charles Phipps, Gore said that he would not have originally appointed Teulon if he had known the entire building was to be remodelled, as he thought "churches built from his designs are too elaborated and fantastical." Gore feared that if any "mistake is made in a building so much to be seen it will be an Eye-Sore instead of an Ornament to the park."

Salvin was subsequently appointed to design a new South Aisle, which was completed in 1866. Queen Victoria found the new chapel "very pretty". The new chapel held 225 people (180 adults with children), and has been hardly changed to the present day.
