= Bonis Hall =

Country house in Prestbury, Cheshire, England

Coordinates: 53.30752°N 2.14689°W

Bonis Hall is a former country house to the north of Prestbury, Cheshire, England. It was the seat of the Pigot family until 1746, when it was bought by Charles Legh of Adlington. In the early part of the 19th century it was remodelled and used by the Legh family as a dower house. In the early 20th century the exterior was pebbledashed, and castellations were added. It is constructed in brick, with Kerridge stone-slate roofs. The house is in two storeys and has a seven-bay front with coped gables surmounted by ball and urn finials. On top of the building is a square tower with a pyramidal roof surmounted by a hexagonal bellcote with a copper cupola and weather vane. It is recorded in the National Heritage List for England (NHLE) as a designated Grade II listed building.

The Duke of York (later King George VI) occasionally stayed at Bonis Hall with its owner Sir Robert Burrows.

It has since been converted for varied uses, mainly as offices and studios, by several companies. It was for some years the Staff College for Midland Bank. It then became The Bonis Hall Country Club. During this time a swimming pool was added and also a large entertainment room cum discothèque. This modern addition was in stark contrast to the existing structure. It then became home to the Manchester branch of Royds Advertising Group, who converted the discothèque into their drawing office. This was extended, in matching style, as more space was required. It is today (2023) the Manchester Campus of yet another advertising company, the McCann Worldgroup. This company has undertaken many further alterations and additions to the site. The disco/drawing office has been replaced by a large, two-story oval structure in steel and glass, which now links the main building with the coaching house.

== See also ==
- Listed buildings in Prestbury, Cheshire
