= Palazzo della Prefettura, Piacenza =

Palace in Emilia-Romagna, Italy

Coordinates: 45.05192°N 9.68955°E

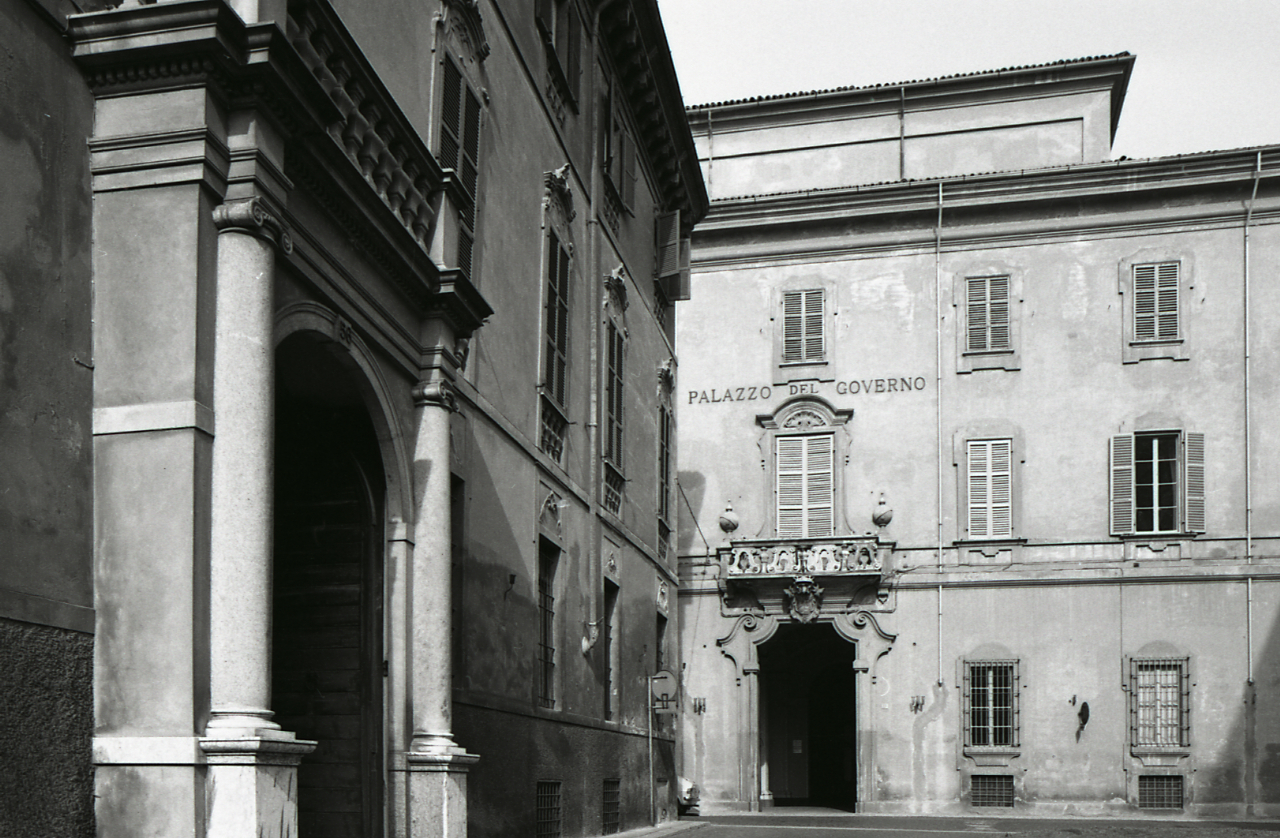

The Palazzo della Prefettura also called the Palazzo Scotti di Vigoleno is a Baroque architecture-style palace located on Via San Giovanni #17 in central Piacenza, region of Emilia-Romagna in Italy. The palace houses the offices of the provincial administration.

== History ==
The palace was commissioned in 1717 by the Marchese Filippo Scotti, and completed in 1727. The architect was Ignazio Cerri, and the palace was intended to house the extended family. The exterior is notable for its baroque balcony. The interior fresco decoration was completed with Rococo scenes by Francesco Natali and Bartolomeo Rusca. The Room of Honor in the palace, also called the Hall of Arms on the basis of the wall decorations has a ceiling fresco depicting the Triumph of the House of Scotti. With the death of the Marchese Gaetano Scotti in 1876, the palace was sold for 70,000 lire to the Provincial government, who converted many of the rooms to offices. The building was looted and damaged in April 1945, at the end of the War, by first the fleeing Fascists and later the partisans.

In front of the main portal and across Via San Giovanni, in front of Palazzo Marliani, is a narrow public square splitting via del Tempio. In a small lawn was placed the bronze monument of La Grande Avventura placed on a small marble pedestal. The monument was completed by Bruno Cassinari in 1983 and depicts a youth on a rearing horse. The Monument was intended to celebrate the 2000 year anniversary of the foundation of the city of Piacenza in 118 BCE. On the granite base are inscribed lines from the poet Salvatore Quasimodo:

Each is alone in the heart of the earth

Pierced by a ray of sun

and suddenly it is night

While Piacenza is famous for its aristocratic baroque equestrian statues of Farnese dukes in Piazza Cavalli, this small ensemble playful inverts the commanding presence of the horseman, but the reticent posture of an initial step.
