= David Williams-Ellis =

British sculptor (born 1959)

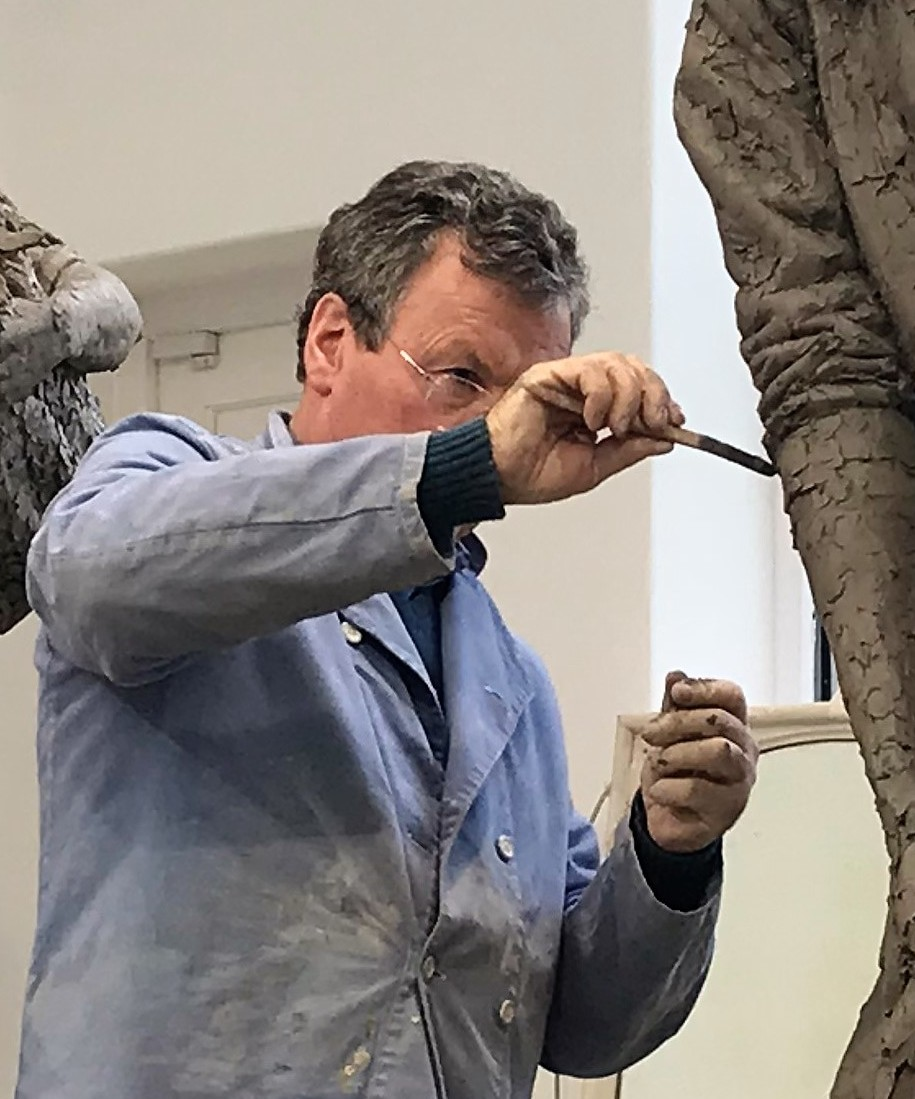
- Born: 1959 (age 66–67); Lisburn, Northern Ireland
- Education: Stowe School; Nerina Simi's; Sir John Cass School of Art, Architecture and Design
- Occupation: Sculptor
- Spouses: Serena Williams-Ellis (divorced); Nicola Shale (m. 2017)
- Children: 3
- Relatives: Clough Williams-Ellis (great uncle)
- Website: https://www.dwe.com

David Williams-Ellis (born 1959) is a British sculptor whose primary subject matter is the human figure.

== Early life and education ==
Williams-Ellis was born in Lisburn, Northern Ireland. His great uncle was Sir Clough Williams-Ellis, architect and creator of Portmeirion in North Wales. His cousin was Susan Williams-Ellis, a pottery designer best known for co-founding Portmeirion Pottery.

Williams-Ellis was educated at Stowe School, Buckinghamshire.

On leaving school, in 1977, he trained under Nerina Simi, in Florence, who taught him to observe the details within a face, the way a person's clothes hung and the details within buildings.

== Career ==
In 1978 he received the Elizabeth T. Greenshield Foundation Award and he was able to work and study with the marble craftsmen of Carrara in Pietrasanta. He was heavily influenced by the early and high Renaissance and Italian art in general, as well as the architecture and visual excitement of Italy. In 1981 he returned to London to attend the Sir John Cass School of Art (now the Sir John Cass School of Art, Architecture and Design).

In 1993 Williams-Ellis was elected as a member of the Royal Cambrian Academy of Art.

Williams-Ellis' exhibition, entitled Elemental, was held at the Portland Gallery in December 2014.

Williams-Ellis' most recent exhibition, entitled D-Day Soldiers, was held at the Portland Gallery in June 2019.

== Notable public commissions ==
In 2021, Williams-Ellis was commissioned by Manchester City Football Club to create a sculpture celebrating Colin Bell, Francis Lee and Mike Summerbee and the major influence they had on the club in their 'Golden Era' of the late 1960s and early 1970s. The commission is part of a series of tributes to key figures forming the Club’s legacy project, first announced in 2019 and directed by Chairman Khaldoon Al Mubarak. The Sculpture was unveiled on 28 November 2023 and is located on the West perimeter in front of the main entrance to the Etihad Stadium.

Williams-Ellis was commissioned by the Normandy Memorial Trust to create the D-Day sculpture to commemorate the 22,443 British and Commonwealth soldiers, sailors, marines and airmen who died during the landings and thereafter. It will be the centre-piece of the memorial park's official inauguration and will occupy a position on the forecourt of the memorial, designed by architect Liam O’Connor, against the backdrop of Gold Beach. The sculpture was unveiled on 6 June 2019, the 75th anniversary of the landings.

Williams-Ellis was selected by Aberdeen City Council to create a sculpture to commemorate and celebrate all the men and women who have served in the city's fishing industry. It consists of two life-size sculptures, a fisherwoman and a fisherman, that stand outside the Aberdeen Maritime Museum. It was unveiled on 27 June 2018.

In 2016 Williams-Ellis was commissioned by the Eden Rivers Trust to sculpt two, over life-size, bronzes of a cock and hen salmon. These were to be sold by the trust to raise money to support their campaign and fundraising initiatives to save the wild salmon and stop their decline, in both the River Eden and other rivers across Britain.

In 2013 Williams-Ellis was commissioned to sculpt an over life size bronze of T. E. Lawrence to commemorate the 80th anniversary of his death to be displayed at Snowdon Lodge, Lawrence's birthplace.

Commissioned by Mary Yapp of the Albany Gallery, Kyffin Williams's agent in Wales, to sculpt an over life size bronze of Kyffin Williams for Oriel Ynys Môn, where the Kyffin Williams Collection is housed.

Commissioned in 2008 to sculpt Ray Gravell, the 10-ton statue now stands outside the south stand of the Parc y Scarlets.

== Personal life ==
Williams-Ellis was married to the interior designer Serena Williams-Ellis, and they have three children together, Hugo, Phoebe, and Jack. In 2014, he lived near Penrith in Cumbria.

In 2016, he moved to Oxfordshire, and in April 2017, he married Nicola "Nikki" Shale (née Burrows) MBE (b. 1956), widow of politician Christopher Shale. She is the mother of Edoardo Mapelli Mozzi, the husband of Princess Beatrice of York, by her first marriage to Alex Mapelli-Mozzi, a former British Olympian. His wife was awarded an MBE for political service as part of the 2016 Prime Minister's Resignation Honours.
