= Princess Beatrice =

British princess (born 1988)

- Mrs Edoardo Mapelli Mozzi
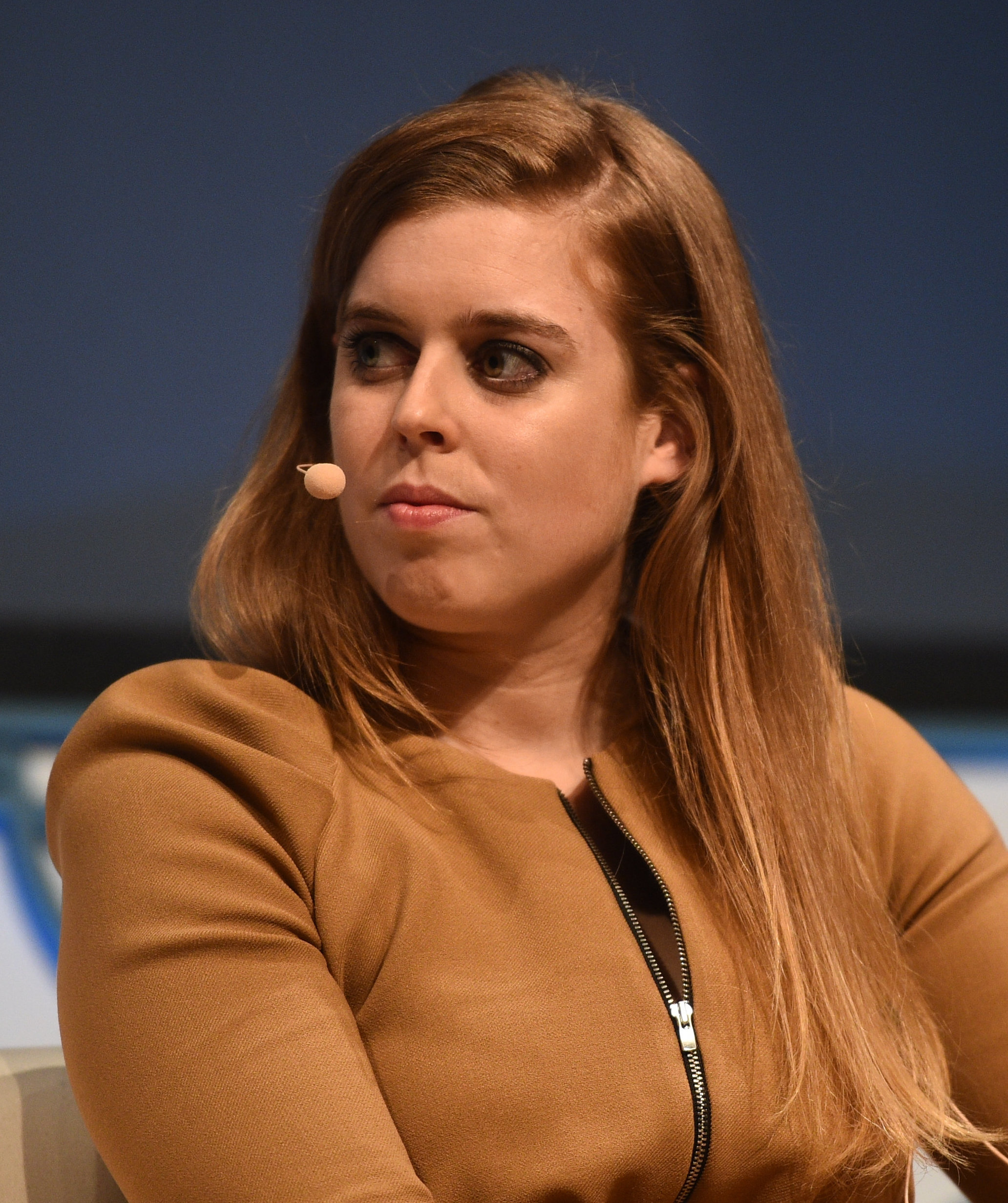
- Beatrice in 2018
- Born: Princess Beatrice of York; 8 August 1988 (age 38); Portland Hospital, London, England
- Spouse: Edoardo Mapelli Mozzi (m. 2020)
- Issue: Sienna Mapelli Mozzi; Athena Mapelli Mozzi
Names
- Beatrice Elizabeth Mary (Note: Before her marriage, as a member of the royal family, Beatrice did not use a family name, but if one had been needed, it was Mountbatten-Windsor. However, by a declaration of George V on 17 July 1917, this does not apply to female descendants in the male line of Queen Victoria "who marry or who have married".)
- House: Windsor
- Father: Andrew Mountbatten-Windsor
- Mother: Sarah Ferguson
- Education: Goldsmiths, University of London

Princess Beatrice, Mrs Edoardo Mapelli Mozzi (Beatrice Elizabeth Mary; born 8 August 1988), is a member of the British royal family. She is the elder daughter of Andrew Mountbatten-Windsor and Sarah Ferguson, and a niece of King Charles III. Born fifth in the line of succession to the British throne, she is ninth as of 2026.

Beatrice was educated at St George's School, Ascot, before reading history at Goldsmiths, University of London, where she graduated with a BA degree. She has held roles at the Foreign Office and Sony Pictures, and currently serves as Vice-President of Strategic Partnerships at the software company Afiniti. She supports several charitable organisations, including the Teenage Cancer Trust and Outward Bound.

In 2020, Beatrice married Edoardo Mapelli Mozzi, an English-born property developer with descent from Italian nobility. They have two daughters.

== Early life and education ==
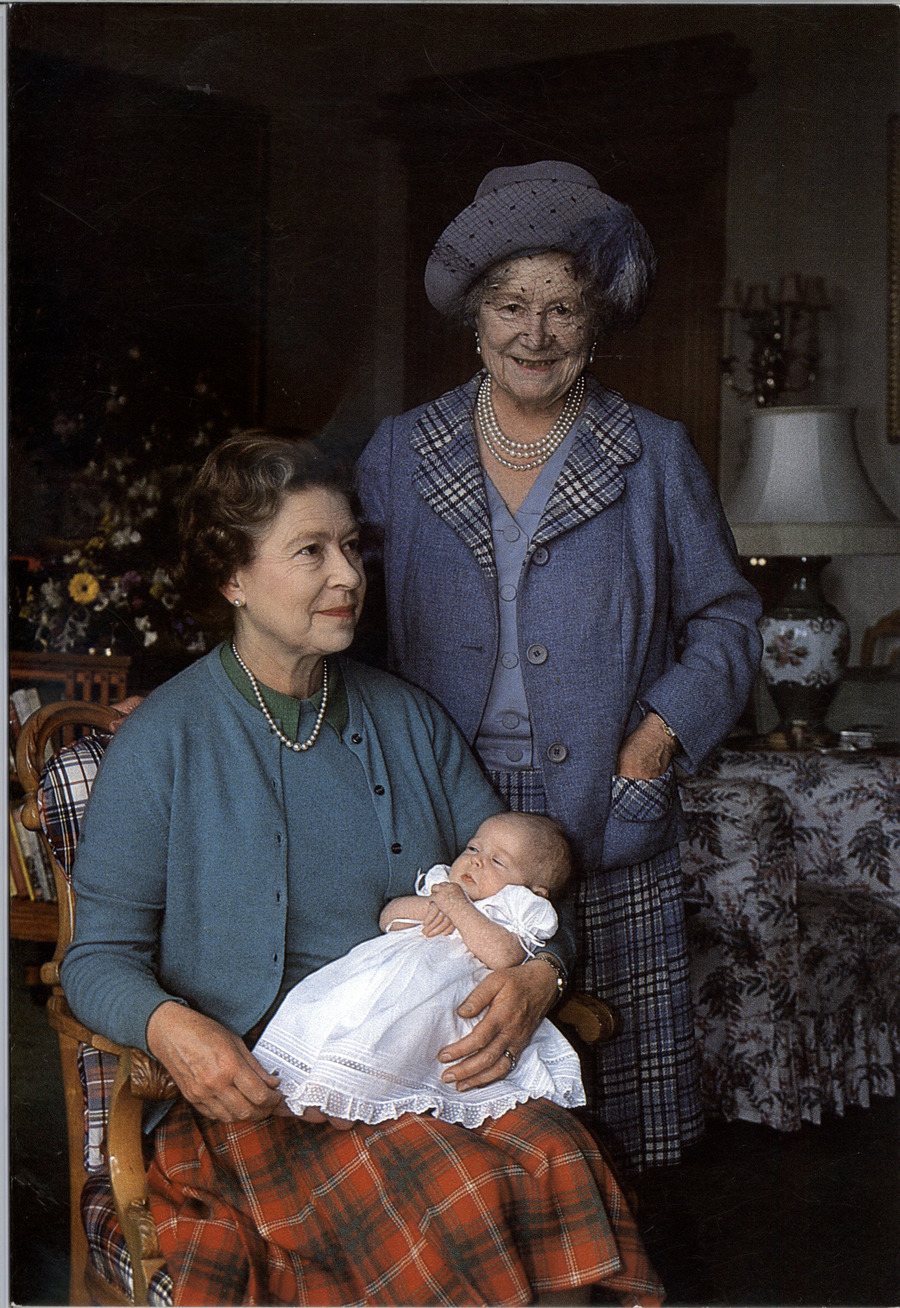
Beatrice with her grandmother Queen Elizabeth II and great-grandmother Queen Elizabeth the Queen Mother, 1988

Beatrice was born at 8:18 pm on 8 August 1988 at the Portland Hospital in London, to the then Duke and Duchess of York. She is the fifth grandchild of Queen Elizabeth II and Prince Philip, Duke of Edinburgh. Beatrice was baptised in the Chapel Royal at St James's Palace on 20 December. Her godparents were Viscount Linley (her father's cousin, now the 2nd Earl of Snowdon); the Duchess of Roxburghe (now Lady Jane Dawnay); Peter Palumbo (now Lord Palumbo); Gabrielle Greenall (the Hon. Mrs John Greenall); and Carolyn Cotterell. Her name was not announced until almost two weeks after her birth. Her younger sister, Princess Eugenie, was born in 1990.

Beatrice's parents divorced amicably when she was seven years old and agreed to joint custody of their two children. After the divorce, the Queen provided her parents with £1.4 million to establish a trust fund for her and Eugenie. Beatrice and her sister frequently travelled abroad, always with one or both of their parents.

Beatrice began her early education at the independent Upton House School in Windsor in 1991. She and her sister then attended the independent Coworth Park School (now Coworth Flexlands School). Beatrice continued her education at the independent St George's School in Ascot, where she was a pupil from 2000 to 2007. She was diagnosed with dyslexia at the age of seven and went public with the diagnosis in 2005, delaying sitting her GCSE exams for one year. She remained at St George's to take her A-Levels, achieving an 'A' in drama, a 'B' in history, and a 'B' in film studies. She was elected Head Girl in her final year, and was a member of the school choir. Beatrice celebrated her 18th birthday with a masked ball at Windsor Castle in July 2006. Count Nikolai von Bismarck photographed her official birthday portrait.

In September 2008, Beatrice began a three-year course at Goldsmiths, University of London, to read history and history of ideas, graduating in 2011 with a BA (2:1 degree).

== Career ==
During the summer of 2008, Beatrice obtained work experience as a sales assistant at Selfridges. She also worked unpaid in the Foreign Office's press office for a period of time. It was reported in 2008 that she was interested in pursuing a career with the Financial Times website. Beatrice became the first member of the family to appear in a non-documentary film when she had a small, non-speaking role as an extra in The Young Victoria (2009), based on the accession and early reign of her ancestor Queen Victoria. For a period, she was a paid intern at Sony Pictures, but she resigned after the hacking incident that affected Sony Group in late 2014.

In April 2015, it was reported that Beatrice had decided to move to New York City. By April 2017, she held a full-time job and divided her time between London and New York. Known professionally as Beatrice York, she served as Vice‑President of Partnerships and Strategy at Afiniti from 2016 to 2025. As of June 2025, she is a strategic advisor for Afiniti. She also leads an Afiniti programme designed to engage senior business leaders around the world in supporting women in leadership. Her work with the programme includes charity initiatives and speaking engagements. She has also held positions with Scale AI and LionTree Asset Management, and founded By-Eq Limited, an advisory group focused on enhancing emotional intelligence during the rise of artificial intelligence.

In January 2022, it was reported that Beatrice had lost her taxpayer-funded police security in 2011, reportedly after her uncle Charles (then Prince of Wales) intervened as part of a cost-cutting initiative. In 2025, Beatrice launched Purpose Economy Intelligence Ltd alongside Luis Alvarado Martínez, a Spanish‑born executive who has worked at the World Economic Forum since 2021. She serves as the company's director, with the business focusing on developing software for homes and workplaces and providing management consulting services.

== Duties and appointments ==
Beatrice and Prince Philip, Duke of Edinburgh accompanied Queen Elizabeth II to the traditional Royal Maundy services on 5 April 2012 in York. There, Beatrice interacted with parishioners, received flowers from the public, and assisted the Queen in giving Maundy money to the pensioners. In the lead-up to the 2012 Summer Olympics, she welcomed the Olympic flame on the steps of Harewood House near Leeds. In 2013, Beatrice and her sister promoted Britain overseas in Germany. She visited the Isle of Wight in 2014, whose former Governor had been her namesake Princess Beatrice, daughter of Queen Victoria. She also accompanied her father during an official engagement to the United Arab Emirates on 24 November 2014.

On 17 September 2022, during the period of official mourning for Queen Elizabeth II, Beatrice joined her sister and six cousins to mount a 15-minute vigil around the late Queen's coffin as it lay in state at Westminster Hall. On 19 September, she joined other members of the royal family at the state funeral.

Upon the accession of Charles III, her position in the line of succession made Beatrice eligible to be appointed a Counsellor of State. In this role, she can potentially carry out official duties while the Sovereign is abroad or unwell.

== Personal life ==
=== Early relationships ===
Beatrice briefly dated Paolo Liuzzo in 2006, an Italo-American whose previous charge for assault and battery caused controversy at the time. For ten years, until July 2016, she was in a relationship with the Virgin Galactic businessman Dave Clark.

=== Marriage and family ===
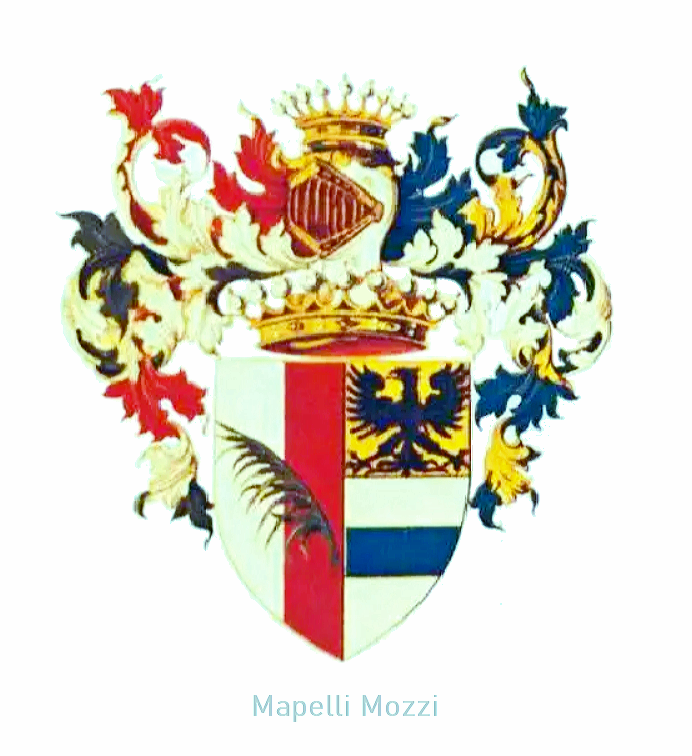
Mapelli Mozzi coat of arms, created counts in 1913

In March 2019, Beatrice attended a fundraising event at the National Portrait Gallery in London accompanied by the Anglo-Italian property developer Edoardo Mapelli Mozzi. The only son of Alex Mapelli-Mozzi, a former Alpine skier for the Great Britain Olympic team, he is a legitimate male‑line descendant of the Mapelli Mozzi family, whose members were granted the title of Count of the Kingdom of Italy in 1913 by King Victor Emmanuel III, with remainder to all male descendants of Edoardo's great‑grandfather Paolo Mapelli Mozzi (1854–1921). The hereditary title may continue to be used by social courtesy, although its legal standing in Italy ceased in 1948 and it has no formal recognition in either the United Kingdom or Italy.

The couple are believed to have begun dating in September 2018. They attended the May 2019 wedding of Lady Gabriella Windsor, Beatrice's second cousin once removed. Beatrice and Mapelli Mozzi became engaged in Italy in September 2019, with their betrothal formally announced by Andrew's office on 26 September.

Their wedding was initially scheduled for 29 May 2020 at the Chapel Royal at St James's Palace, followed by a private reception in Buckingham Palace Gardens, but first the reception and then the wedding itself were postponed because of the COVID-19 pandemic. Beatrice married Mapelli Mozzi in a private ceremony on 17 July 2020 at the Royal Chapel of All Saints, Royal Lodge, Windsor. Her father's association with Jeffrey Epstein, an American financier and convicted sex offender, also affected the scale of the wedding; following Andrew's widely criticised BBC interview and subsequent withdrawal from royal duties, the arrangements were significantly reduced. Although Andrew walked Beatrice down the aisle, he did not appear in the official wedding portraits released by Buckingham Palace. Beatrice wore a remodelled Sir Norman Hartnell gown lent by the Queen, and the Queen Mary Fringe Tiara, which the Queen had worn at her own wedding.

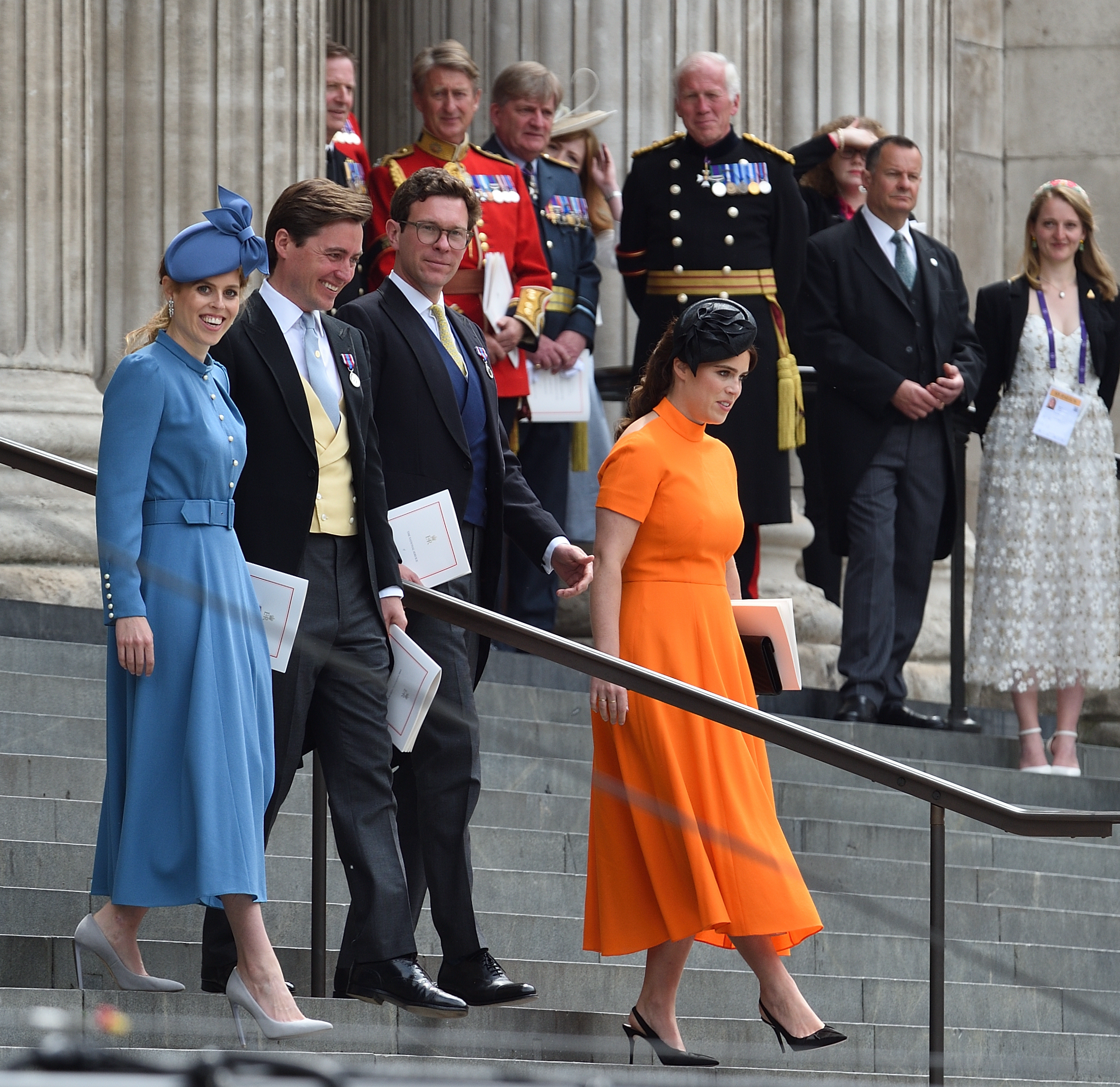
Beatrice with her husband, Edoardo Mapelli Mozzi, and her sister, Princess Eugenie, and her husband, Jack Brooksbank, in 2022

Beatrice has a stepson, Christopher Woolf ("Wolfie"), from her husband's previous relationship with the architect Dara Huang. She gave birth to a daughter, Sienna Elizabeth Mapelli Mozzi, on 18 September 2021 at the Chelsea and Westminster Hospital in London. At birth, Sienna was 11th in line to the British throne, and following the death of Queen Elizabeth II on 8 September 2022, she is now 10th. She was christened at the Chapel Royal at St James's Palace on 29 April 2022.

Beatrice and her husband initially lived in a four-bedroom apartment at St James's Palace, but reportedly moved to a manor house in the Cotswolds in late 2022. Beatrice was offered the apartment at St James's Palace when she was 19, and she and her sister used it rent-free until 2012, after which their father was asked to pay around £20,000 in rent annually, which was below the market rate. According to a report by the National Audit Office in June 2026, Beatrice has not personally paid rent on any royal properties she has lived on.

Beatrice gave birth to their second daughter, Athena Elizabeth Rose, on 22 January 2025 at the Chelsea and Westminster Hospital in London, several weeks prematurely. She was christened at the Chapel Royal at St James's Palace on 12 December. Athena is 11th in line to the British throne.

== Charity work ==
In 2002, Beatrice visited children living with HIV in Russia. In Britain, she supported Springboard for Children, a literacy project for primary-school pupils with learning difficulties, and the Teenage Cancer Trust. In an interview to mark her 18th birthday, Beatrice said she wished to use her position to assist others through charity work; she had already undertaken charitable duties alongside her mother through the various organisations supported by the Duchess.

In April 2010, Beatrice became the first member of the British royal family to complete the London Marathon, running to raise money for Children in Crisis. She is the patron of Forget-Me-Not Children's Hospice, which supports children with life-shortening conditions in West Yorkshire and North Manchester.

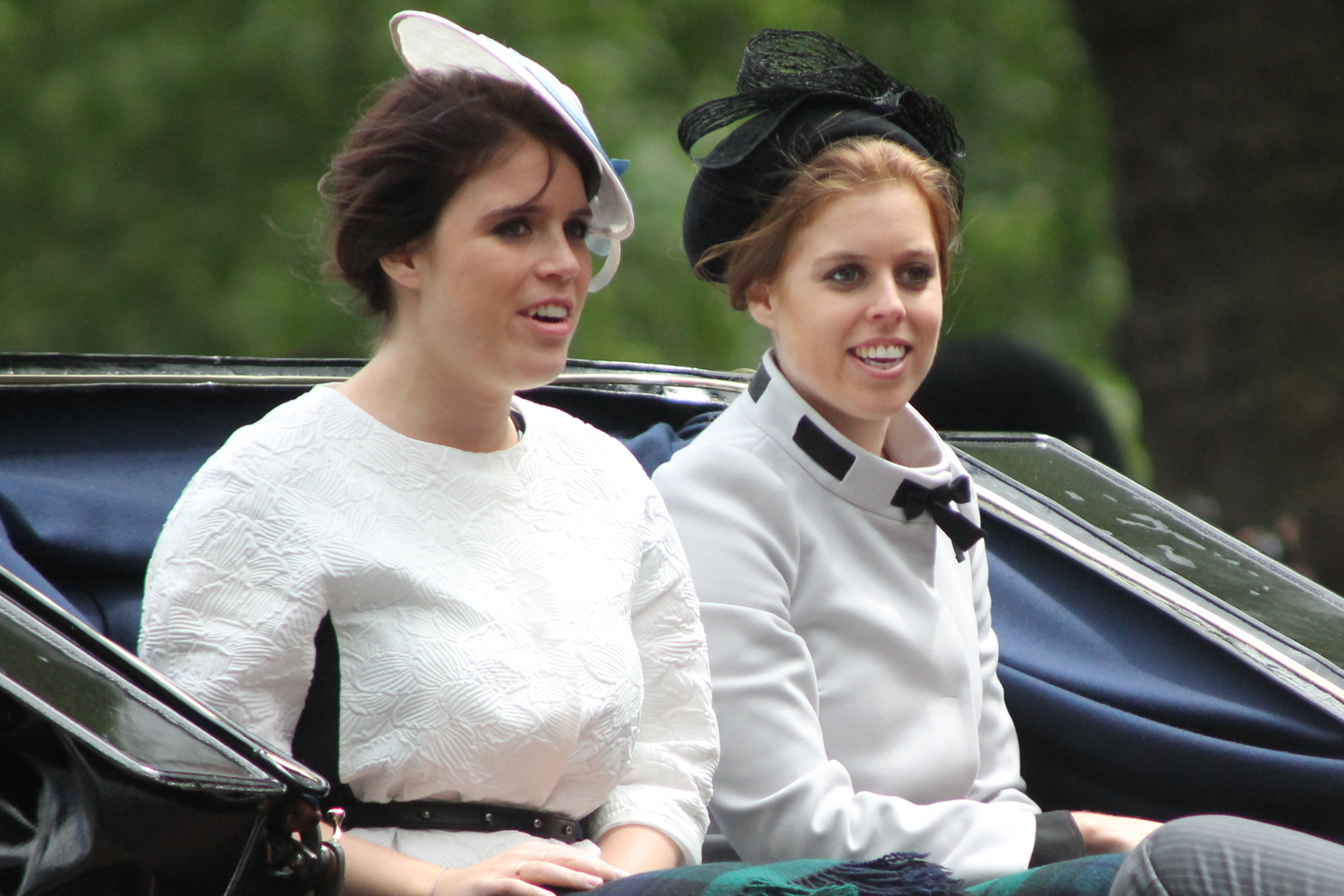
Beatrice (right) with her younger sister Eugenie at Trooping the Colour, June 2013

In November 2012, Beatrice became a patron of the York Musical Society. In April 2013, she became royal patron of the Helen Arkell Dyslexia Centre, a charity she credits with helping her overcome the academic challenges associated with dyslexia.

In 2016, she, her mother, and her sister Eugenie collaborated with the British contemporary artist Teddy McDonald to create the first royal contemporary art painting. Titled Royal Love, it was painted at Royal Lodge and exhibited at Masterpiece London before being sold, with all proceeds donated by McDonald to Children in Crisis. In 2018, Children in Crisis merged with Street Child, a children's charity active in multiple countries, with Beatrice serving as its ambassador. She also supported the Pitch@Palace initiative, founded by her father to amplify and accelerate entrepreneurs' business ideas.

Beatrice took part in a South Asia Tour in 2016 that lasted nine days. She visited Nepal, India, and Bhutan on behalf of the Franks Family Foundation (FFF) and the Jamgon Kongtrul Eyes Centres, a free micro-surgical cataract programme run in technical collaboration with Nepal's Tilganga Eye Centre under the direction of the Nepali eye surgeon Sanduk Ruit. A few weeks later, she attended the 2016 Asia Game Changer Awards Dinner at the United Nations in New York City, which honoured Ruit and others. She and Charles Rockefeller presented Ruit with his Asia Society Asia Game Changer Award.

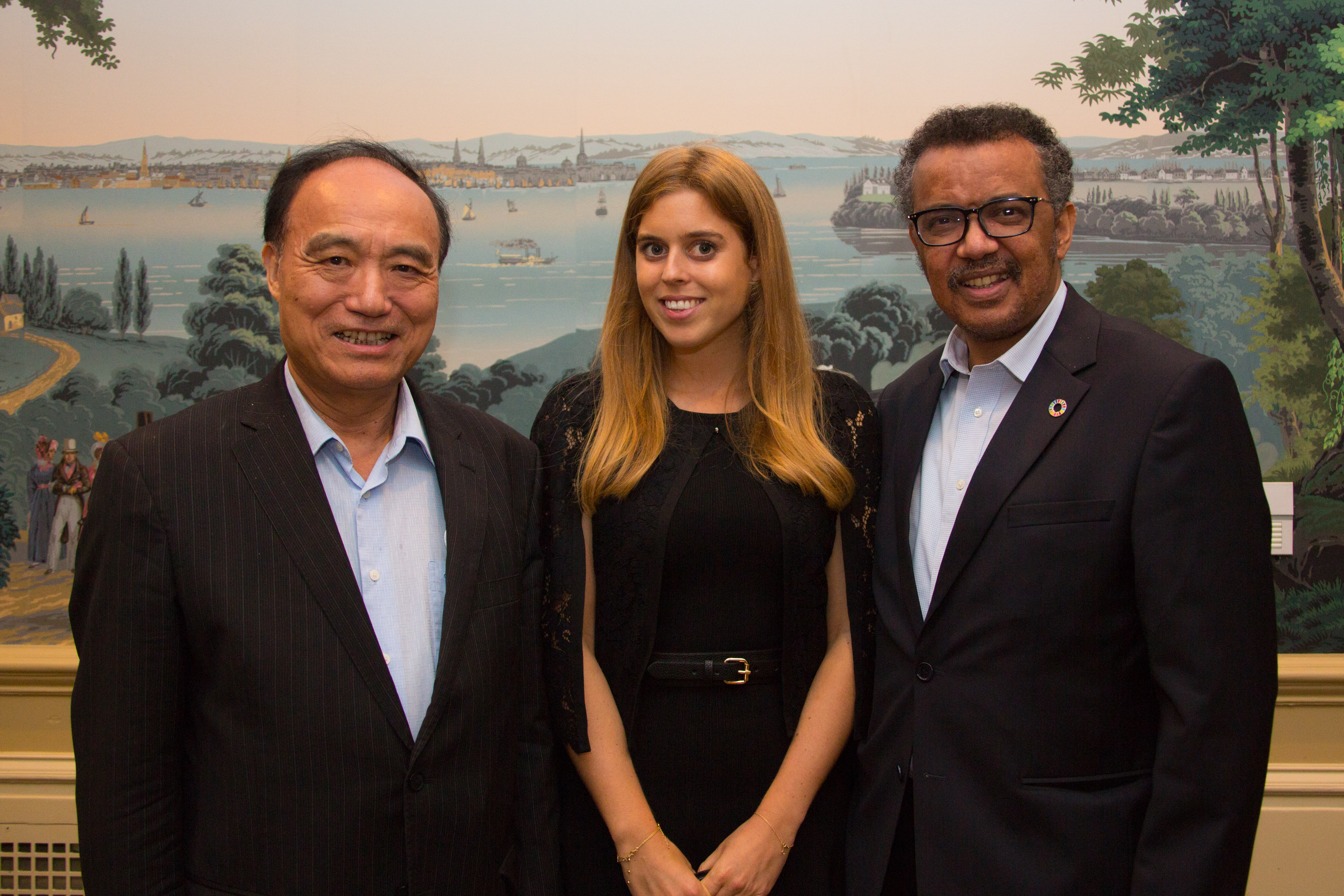
Beatrice with Houlin Zhao and Tedros Adhanom at a UN Broadband Commission Dinner, September 2017

Beatrice is the founder of Big Change, a charity she established with six friends to encourage young people to develop skills "outside a traditional academic curriculum". In 2012, she climbed Mont Blanc in aid of the charity. In 2016, she joined Sir Richard Branson and his children in the Virgin Strive Challenge, a fundraising event that included climbing Mount Etna.

In October 2018, she undertook an extended tour of Laos to "raise the profile of the UK" there, and also participated in the Luang Prabang Half-Marathon for Children. In March 2019, Beatrice was elected to the board of the UK charity the Outward Bound Trust as a trustee, after her father succeeded to the royal patronage from his father, the Duke of Edinburgh. In May 2019, she was honoured at a New York City gala for her work with Friends Without a Border. She has also supported the Kairos HQ, a non-profit organisation of entrepreneurs at universities in China, Europe, India, and the US.

In April 2022, in her capacity as an ambassador for the charity Made By Dyslexia, she and her husband took part in the first World Dyslexia Assembly, hosted by Prince Carl Philip of Sweden.

In February 2023, Beatrice was named patron of the British Skin Foundation. In March 2025, she became patron of the charity Borne, which funds research into the causes of premature birth. In July 2025, she was appointed patron of the Chartered College of Teaching, a role previously held by her grandfather Prince Philip. In November 2025, Beatrice was appointed deputy patron of Outward Bound Trust.

== Fashion ==
An illustration of Beatrice's 2011 Royal Wedding fascinator

At the April 2011 wedding of her cousin Prince William, Beatrice's unusual fascinator, designed by Philip Treacy, attracted significant public and media attention. The following month, the headpiece was auctioned on eBay for £81,000, with the proceeds going to two charities: UNICEF and Children in Crisis.

In 2017, she helped promote the anti-bullying book Be Cool Be Nice and gave an interview to Vogue at a House of Lords event, speaking about her own experiences of being bullied for her fashion choices in early adulthood. Hello! magazine later named her one of the best-dressed royals of 2017. In May 2018, she attended the Met Gala in New York City. She topped Tatler's best-dressed list in 2024.

== Titles, styles, and arms ==
=== Titles and styles ===
Royal monogram

As a male-line grandchild of the British sovereign, Beatrice was known at birth as "Her Royal Highness Princess Beatrice of York", the territorial designation deriving from her father's former title, Duke of York. Since her marriage, she has been styled in the Court Circular as "Her Royal Highness Princess Beatrice, Mrs Edoardo Mapelli Mozzi".

=== Arms ===
Coat of arms of Princess Beatrice
Notes The Princess's personal Arms are those of the Sovereign in right of the United Kingdom borne on a lozenge, differenced by a label of five points bearing three bees in allusion to her forename and maternal arms. Adopted 18 July 2006 Coronet Coronet of a male-line grandchild of the Sovereign. Escutcheon Quarterly, 1st and 4th Gules three Lions passant guardant in pale Or, 2nd Or a Lion rampant Gules within a double tressure flory-counter-flory Gules, 3rd Azure a Harp Or stringed Argent. Supporters Dexter a Lion rampant gardant Or imperially crowned Proper, Sinister a Unicorn Argent armed crined and unguled Or gorged with a Coronet Or composed of crosses patées and fleurs-de-lis a chain affixed thereto passing between the forelegs and reflexed over the back also Or. Other elements The whole differenced by a Label of five points Argent, the centre and exterior points each charged with a Bee volant Proper. Banner The Princess's personal standard is that of the Sovereign in right of the United Kingdom, labelled for difference as in her arms. (in Scotland) Symbolism As with the Royal Arms of the United Kingdom, the first and fourth quarters are those of England, the second of Scotland, the third of Ireland. The three bees in her Arms continue the trend in royal heraldry (cf. the Arms of Prince Harry, Duke of Sussex) of using charges from the maternal line: her mother's arms depict a bee. It can also be considered a pun on the name Beatrice, an unusual example of canting in modern royal arms. Other versions Princess Beatrice, Mrs Edoardo Mapelli Mozzi's conjugal arms display side-by-side, Mapelli Mozzi on a shield to the dexter and hers on a lozenge to the sinister beneath their respective coronets, viz. and The Counts Mapelli Mozzi's escutcheon is blazoned (in Italian): Interzato in palo, nel 1° partito d'argento e di rosso caricato da una palma di verde in banda (Mapelli), nel 2° d'argento alla fascia d'azzurro col capo d'oro dell'Impero (Mozzi):

== Authored articles ==
- Princess Beatrice (4 March 2021). "Getting into stories has been a gift I'm happy to have shared with lockdown life". Evening Standard.
- Princess Beatrice (23 March 2025). ""There's So Little Control": Princess Beatrice Opens Up About Daughter Athena's Preterm Birth In Her Own Words". British Vogue.

Princess Beatrice House of Windsor Born: 8 August 1988
Lines of succession
Preceded by Andrew Mountbatten-Windsor	Succession to the British throne 9th in line	Followed by Sienna Mapelli Mozzi
Orders of precedence in the United Kingdom
Preceded by Harriet Phillips	Ladies; HRH Princess Beatrice, Mrs Edoardo Mapelli Mozzi	Followed by Princess Eugenie, Mrs Jack Brooksbank
