= Bainbridge's =

Department store in Newcastle upon Tyne, England

Coordinates: 54.975°N 1.614°W

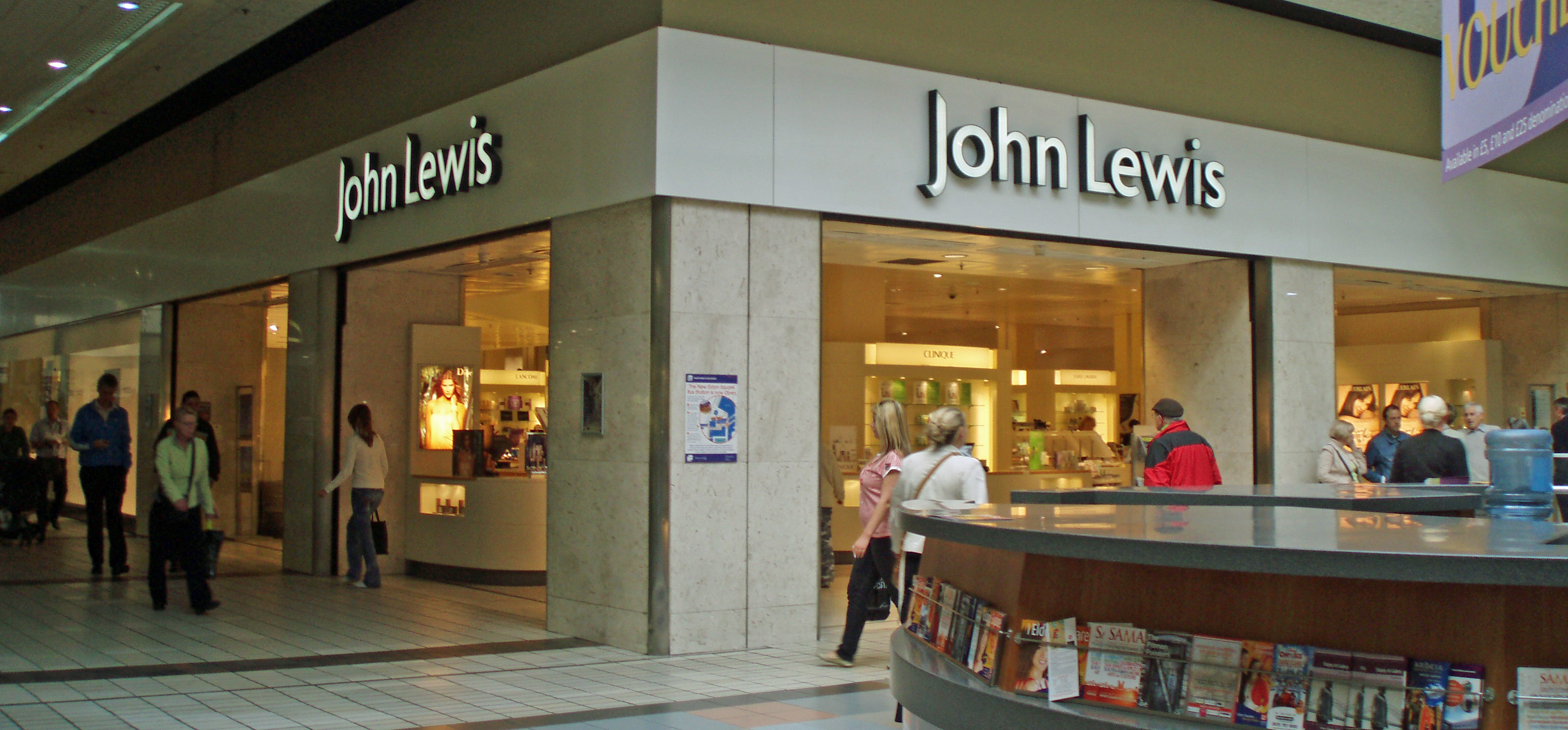

Bainbridge's (company name Bainbridge & Co) was a major department store in Eldon Square in the centre of Newcastle upon Tyne, England. The store, which is now branded as John Lewis Newcastle, moved to its current site in 1976, but the company dates back to 1838. It claimed to be the first true department store in the world, having begun recording weekly turnover separately by department in 1849. In 2002, after a vote by store employees, the owner John Lewis changed the official name to John Lewis Newcastle.

== History ==
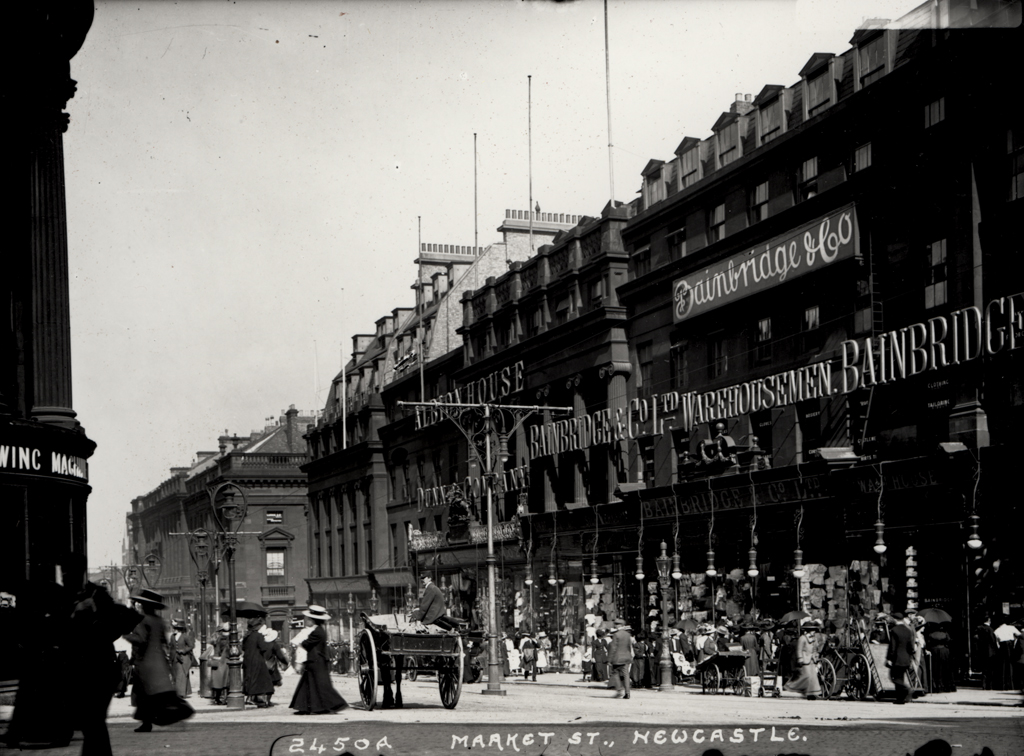
Bainbridge's Market Street frontage (alongside that of Dunn & Company) c.1912

The store dates back to 1838, when Emerson Muschamp Bainbridge went into partnership with William Alder Dunn and opened a drapers and fashion shop in Newcastle's Market Street. Despite success the two partners fell out and went their separate ways. Their partnership was dissolved in 1841.

In 1849 there were 23 separate departments, with weekly takings recorded by department, the basis for its claim to be the world's first true department store. This ledger survives and is now kept in the archives of the John Lewis Partnership. Emerson became the sole proprietor in 1855. By the 1870s there were more than forty retail departments.

Emerson Bainbridge died in 1892 and his sons took over the business. In that same year, Bainbridge's employed a staff of 600 in Newcastle, and the store had 11,705 square yards of floor space. In 1897 the business became a private limited company. During the Depression, which hit the Newcastle area badly, the store introduced agents who operated in less prosperous areas, collecting payments in weekly instalments. This meant that people on low incomes could continue to buy from the shop and it kept the Bainbridge name and reputation known in areas where otherwise it might have faded away.

In 1952 an offer from the John Lewis Partnership was accepted and ownership transferred to John Lewis in the following year, although the store continued to operate under the Bainbridge brand alongside the words "A branch of the John Lewis Partnership". The John Lewis takeover allowed much needed capital investment into the store, making it into one of the leading department stores in the UK by 1974. In 1976 the store was relocated to the Eldon Square shopping centre in the city, and was at the time the largest John Lewis store outside London.

In 2002 further refurbishment took place, and in the same year (following a suggestion from the store partners) the store was re-branded as John Lewis.

At the time of its demise, the Bainbridge name was one of the longest continuously traded department store brands in the world.
