= Italian Civil Code =

The Italian Civil Code (Italian: Codice civile) is the civil code of Italy, a collection of norms regulating private law. It was enacted under Fascist rule, by Royal decree no. 262 of 16 March 1942. It predates the current Italian Constitution, and it was amended in the postwar period. The 1942 civil code replaced an earlier civil code which was in force since 1865, the latter being essentially an Italian translation of the Napoleonic Code. Some parts of the 1942 code are based on the German Civil Code of 1900.

== Contents ==
- Preliminary provisions: 16 provisions applying to all books of the civil code.
- Book 1 - family law: marriage, adoption.
- Book 2 - inheritance law: wills.
- Book 3 - property: movable items, real estate, property rights and limits.
- Book 4 - bonds, purchase and sale contracts, mortgages.
- Book 5 - business law and labor law.
- Book 6 - civil liability, transcription, credit law, rules of evidence.
