= Sarah Ferguson =

British former royal and author (born 1959)

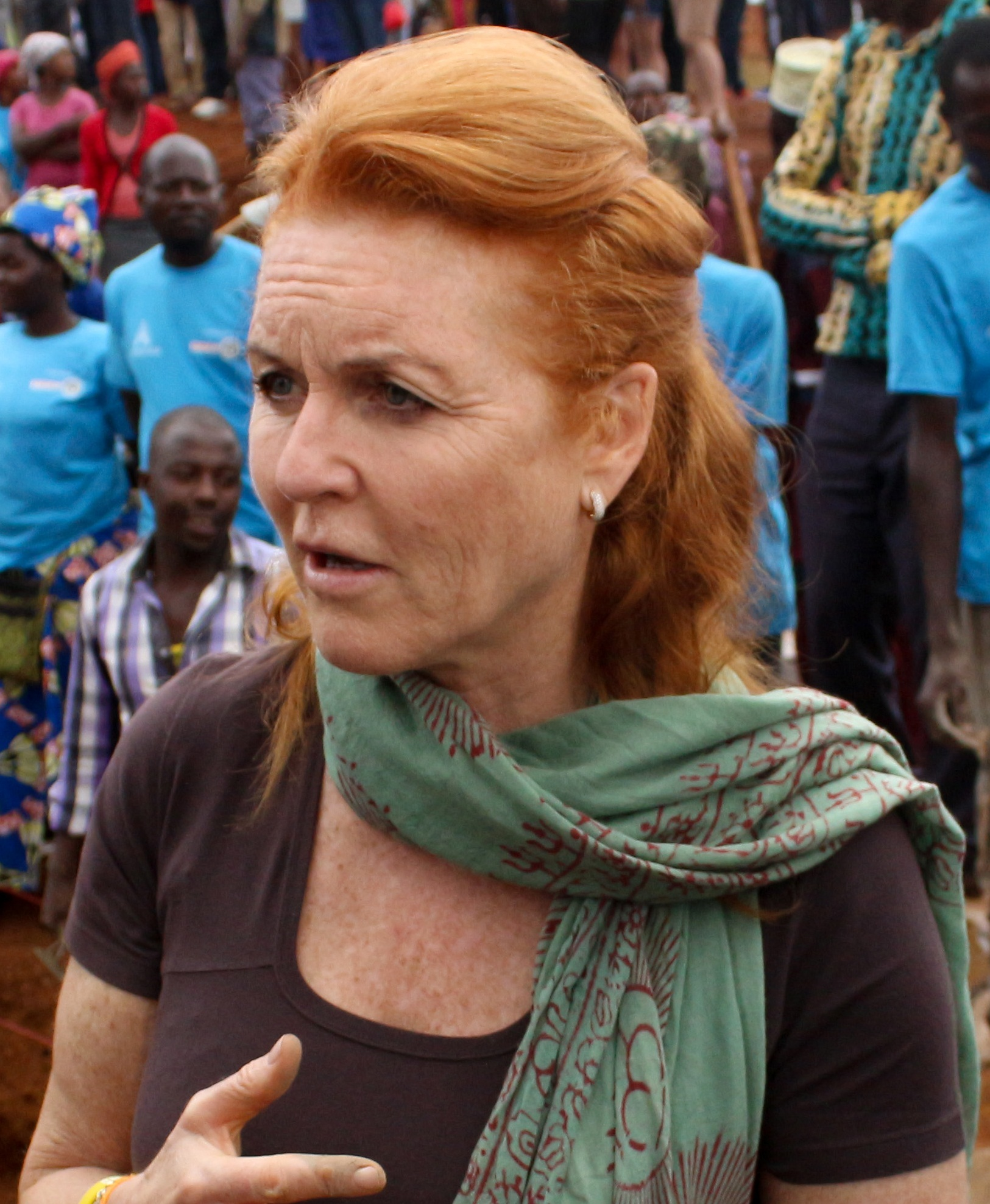
- Ferguson in 2017
- Born: Sarah Margaret Ferguson; 15 October 1959 (age 67); London, England
- Occupations: Author; spokesperson; television personality
- Spouse: Prince Andrew, Duke of York (m. 1986; div. 1996)
- Children: Princess Beatrice; Princess Eugenie
- Parents: Ronald Ferguson (father); Susan Wright (mother)

Sarah Margaret Ferguson (born 15 October 1959), formerly Sarah, Duchess of York, and commonly known as Fergie, is a British author, spokesperson, and television personality. She is the ex-wife of Andrew Mountbatten-Windsor, the former Prince Andrew, Duke of York, the second son of Queen Elizabeth II and younger brother of King Charles III.

Ferguson grew up in Dummer, Hampshire, and attended the Queen's Secretarial College. She later worked for public relations firms in London and for a publishing company. She began a relationship with Andrew in 1985, and they were married on 23 July 1986 at Westminster Abbey, upon which she became Duchess of York. They have two daughters: Beatrice and Eugenie. Their marriage, separation in 1992, and divorce in 1996 attracted extensive media coverage.

Both during and after her marriage, Ferguson has been involved with several charities, primarily focused on supporting cancer patients and children. She was the patron of the Teenage Cancer Trust from 1990 to 2025 and founded Children in Crisis and Sarah's Trust. She has written several books for children and adults, and has worked on TV and film production.

In the years following her divorce, Ferguson was the subject of various scandals that affected her relationship with the royal family. Her friendship with the American child sex offender Jeffrey Epstein led to the termination of her roles as patron and spokesperson for multiple charities. In October 2025, Ferguson ceased using the courtesy title Duchess of York following Andrew's announcement that he would no longer use his peerage titles.

== Early life ==
Sarah Margaret Ferguson was born on 15 October 1959 at London Welbeck Hospital, London, the second daughter of Major Ronald Ferguson (1931–2003) and Susan Barrantes (née Wright; 1937–1998). She has one older full sister, Jane. After her parents divorced in 1974, her mother married polo player Héctor Barrantes the following year and moved to Trenque Lauquen in the Argentine pampas. Ferguson remained at the 480-acre (190-hectare) Dummer Down Farm in Dummer, Hampshire, which had been her father's home since she was eight. Major Ferguson married Susan Deptford in 1976, and had three more children: Andrew, Alice, and Elizabeth. Ferguson later said that, aged 12, when her parents' marriage began to break down, she developed an eating disorder and "turned to overeating for comfort".

Ferguson, known informally as "Fergie", once described her family as "country gentry with a bit of old money". She is a descendant of King Charles II of England through three of his illegitimate children: Charles Lennox, 1st Duke of Richmond; James Scott, 1st Duke of Monmouth; and Anne Lennard, Countess of Sussex. Her wider ancestry is aristocratic; she is the great-great-granddaughter of the 6th Duke of Buccleuch, a great-granddaughter of the 8th Viscount Powerscourt, and a descendant of the 1st Duke of Abercorn and the 4th Duke of Devonshire. She is distantly related to her former husband as both are descended from the 4th Duke of Devonshire and from King James VI and I.

Ferguson attended Daneshill Preparatory School in Stratfield Turgis, Hampshire. Staff at the school described her as a "courageous, bubbly and outgoing little girl". She later attended Hurst Lodge School in Ascot. Although she did not shine academically, she showed talent in swimming and tennis. From a young age, Ferguson developed an interest in skiing and later worked briefly as a chalet girl. During her teenage years, she worked as both a cleaner and a waitress. After completing a course at Queen's Secretarial College aged 18, she took a job at an art gallery. She subsequently worked in two public relations firms in London, followed by a position at a publishing company. Before her marriage, Ferguson dated Kim Smith-Bingham, a stockbroker, and Paddy McNally, a motor racing manager more than 20 years her senior.

== Marriage to Andrew ==
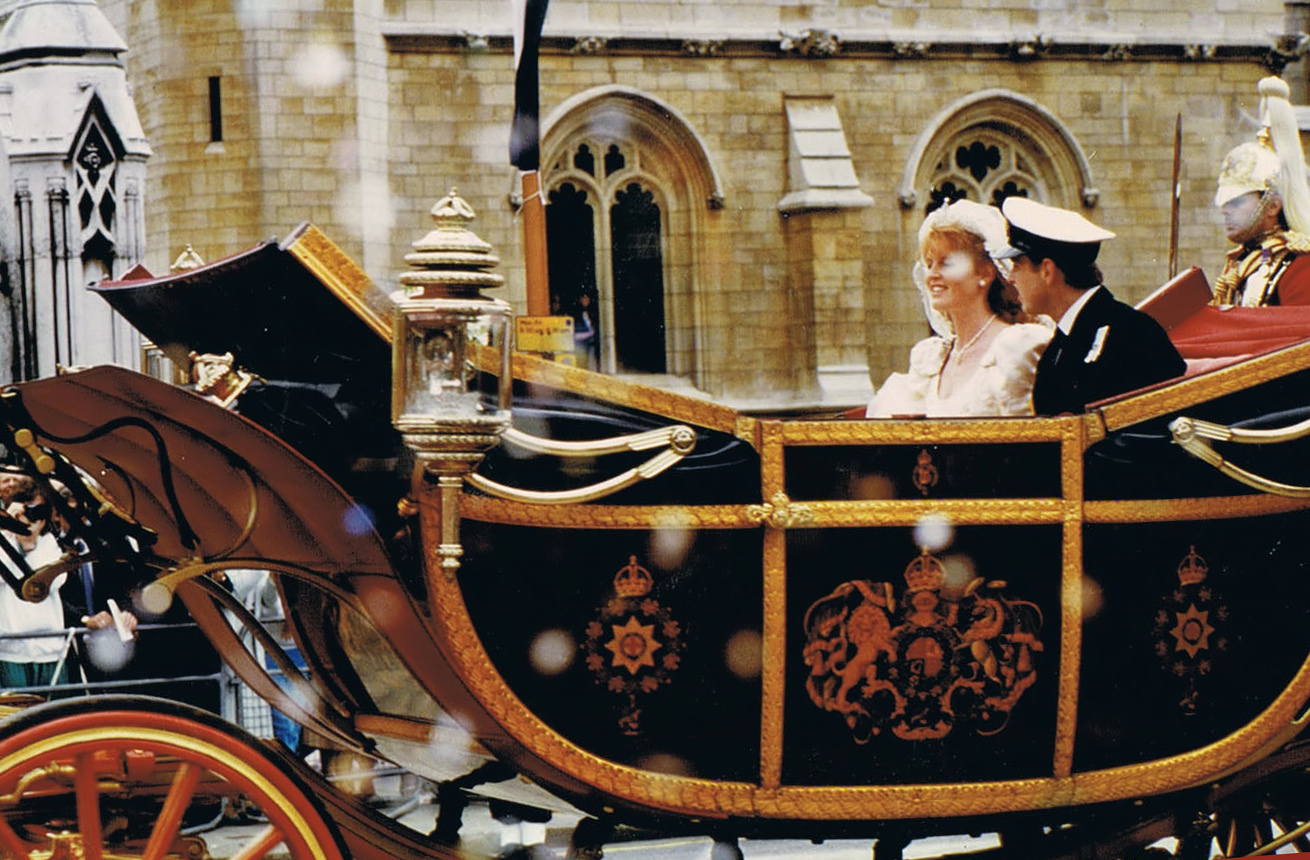
The Duke and Duchess of York on their wedding day

On 19 March 1986, Ferguson and Prince Andrew announced their engagement. The pair had known each other since childhood, meeting occasionally at polo matches, and were reacquainted at Royal Ascot in 1985. Before the engagement, Ferguson had accompanied Diana, Princess of Wales, during her official tour of Andrew's ship HMS Brazen. Andrew designed the engagement ring himself: ten diamonds set around a Burmese ruby, chosen to complement Ferguson's red hair. Her friendly manner and lively spirit made her a welcome addition to the royal family.

After securing the Queen's consent, which was then required under the Royal Marriages Act 1772 for all descendants of King George II, Ferguson and Andrew were married at Westminster Abbey on 23 July 1986. The Queen bestowed the title Duke of York upon Andrew, and, as his wife, Ferguson automatically gained his royal and ducal status, becoming "Her Royal Highness The Duchess of York". In her new role, she joined the Duke in undertaking royal engagements, including overseas visits.

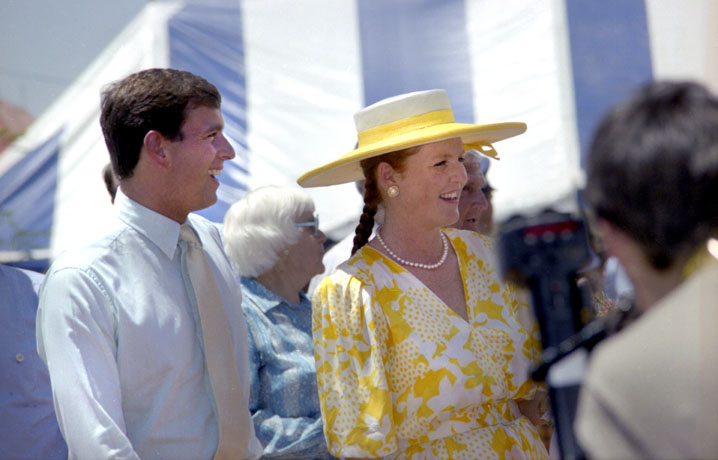
Andrew and Sarah in Townsville, 1988

In 1987, Ferguson and Andrew undertook a 25-day tour of Canada. In February that year, she passed her private pilot's licence after completing a 40-hour training course paid for by Lord Hanson as a wedding gift, and she was presented with her wings at RAF Benson in December.

On 22 January 1988, during a visit to New York City to attend a fundraising event, Ferguson was attacked by a young man at the entrance of her hotel. The man, who shouted "murderers 3/8" and carried an Irish Republican Army flag as he rushed towards her, was charged with "attempted assault on the Duchess and assault on a federal agent". A State Department press officer later confirmed that "she was unharmed in the incident".

In March 1988, the couple made a royal tour of California. Two British newspapers described the trip as a "brash, vulgar, excessive, weak-humored exhibition by two royals". City officials in Los Angeles defended the couple, calling the criticism "awful" and offensive, while observers described the Duke and Duchess as friendly and said they had fulfilled their duties.

The couple's first child, Princess Beatrice, was born on 8 August 1988. Ferguson experienced high blood pressure and excessive water retention during the pregnancy. In September, she joined Andrew in Australia for an official visit, a decision that drew criticism from the press for leaving her newborn daughter in the United Kingdom. Their second daughter, Princess Eugenie, was born on 23 March 1990 by caesarean section. During her marriage, the tabloid press frequently mocked Ferguson's weight – which reached 15 stone 10 pounds (100 kg) (220 lbs) during her first pregnancy – and labelled her "Duchess of Pork" and "Fat Fergie". She vowed to lose weight after Beatrice's birth. In 1989, Ferguson was credited with helping to popularise the Callanetics exercise regime in the United Kingdom after reports that founder Callan Pinckney had given her private tuition. She received praise for her weight loss, as well as some criticism for not gaining enough weight during her second pregnancy. Ferguson later said that the press coverage of her weight damaged her self‑esteem and worsened her eating disorder.

In May 1989, Ferguson undertook an official solo visit to Berlin.

=== Separation and divorce ===
Biographer Sarah Bradford wrote that Andrew's duties as a naval officer required long periods away from home. According to Ferguson, the couple saw each other for only 40 days a year during the first five years of their marriage. By 1991, the relationship was under strain, with Ferguson finding life within the royal family increasingly difficult. Her friendship with Texan multimillionaire Steve Wyatt, son of Lynn Wyatt, attracted considerable publicity when photographs – including one showing Wyatt with Ferguson's infant daughter – appeared in newspapers in January 1992. Ferguson and Andrew announced their separation on 19 March 1992. After the announcement, the palace stated that Ferguson would no longer undertake public engagements on behalf of the Queen, and the Queen later confirmed that she would not assume responsibility for Ferguson's debts. Ferguson established a separate residence from Andrew in 1992, moving to Romenda Lodge on the Wentworth Estate in Surrey.

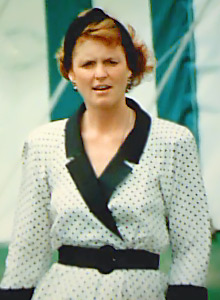
The then-Duchess of York at the Royal Welsh Show, 1991

In August 1992, the Daily Mirror published surreptitiously taken photographs of John Bryan, an American financial manager, kissing Ferguson's toes while she sunbathed topless. The incident led to widespread public ridicule and contributed to her further estrangement from the royal family. The French magazine Paris Match was later ordered to pay £84,000 in damages for printing the photographs, although the original claim had been for £1.32 million. On 28 March 1993, it was announced that a formal separation agreement between Ferguson and Andrew had been finalised, following months of speculation that they might reconcile. In 1995, Andrew's aunt Princess Margaret, who had received a bouquet of flowers from Ferguson, reportedly wrote to her: "You have done more to bring shame on the family than could ever have been imagined".

Reports and speculation about a possible reconciliation continued into late 1995, ending when Ferguson and Andrew announced their mutual decision to divorce in April 1996. In the years following the divorce, she said she had received £15,000 a year as a divorce settlement and described her role as a spokeswoman for Weight Watchers as her main "source of income". However, senior officials later told The Sunday Telegraph that the settlement had included £350,000 in cash, £500,000 from the Queen to purchase a house for Ferguson and the children, and a monthly allowance that was estimated to have totalled £500,000 by 2010. Ferguson and Andrew shared custody of their children. The decree nisi was granted on 17 April 1996 and the divorce was finalised on 30 May 1996, after which Ferguson legally retained the style "Her Royal Highness" in the same manner as other divorced peeresses. However, it was announced in April that she had chosen not to use the style and would relinquish it under the terms of the divorce. In accordance with letters patent issued in August 1996 regulating post-divorce royal titles, she formally ceased to be a "Royal Highness".

In November 1996, Ferguson published her autobiography Sarah: My Story and undertook a promotional tour. During an appearance on a US chat show, she implied that she and Andrew had had an open relationship, saying "He always knew exactly what was going on", and "It's not a one-way street. We respect each other's space." In a 2007 interview, reflecting on why they finalised their divorce, she said, "I wanted to work; it's not right for a princess of the royal house to be commercial, so Andrew and I decided to make the divorce official so I could go off and get a job."

Since the divorce, Ferguson has attended several events with her daughters, including Andrew's investitures into the Royal Victorian Order and the Order of the Garter, as well as Royal Ascot. On such occasions, she is afforded the courtesy of treatment as a member of the royal family. She hinted at the possibility of remarrying Andrew in several interviews. In August 2013, she was invited to stay at Balmoral Castle with Andrew and their daughters as guests of the Queen, and in September 2013, when asked about the prospect of remarriage, Ferguson said: "He's still my handsome prince, he'll always be my handsome prince."

She was not invited to the 1999 wedding of Prince Edward and Sophie Rhys-Jones nor the 2011 wedding of Prince William and Catherine Middleton, but she did attend the wedding of Prince Harry and Meghan Markle in 2018. However, she did not receive an invitation to the evening reception at Frogmore House hosted by Prince Charles, and was reportedly "deeply upset" by her exclusion.

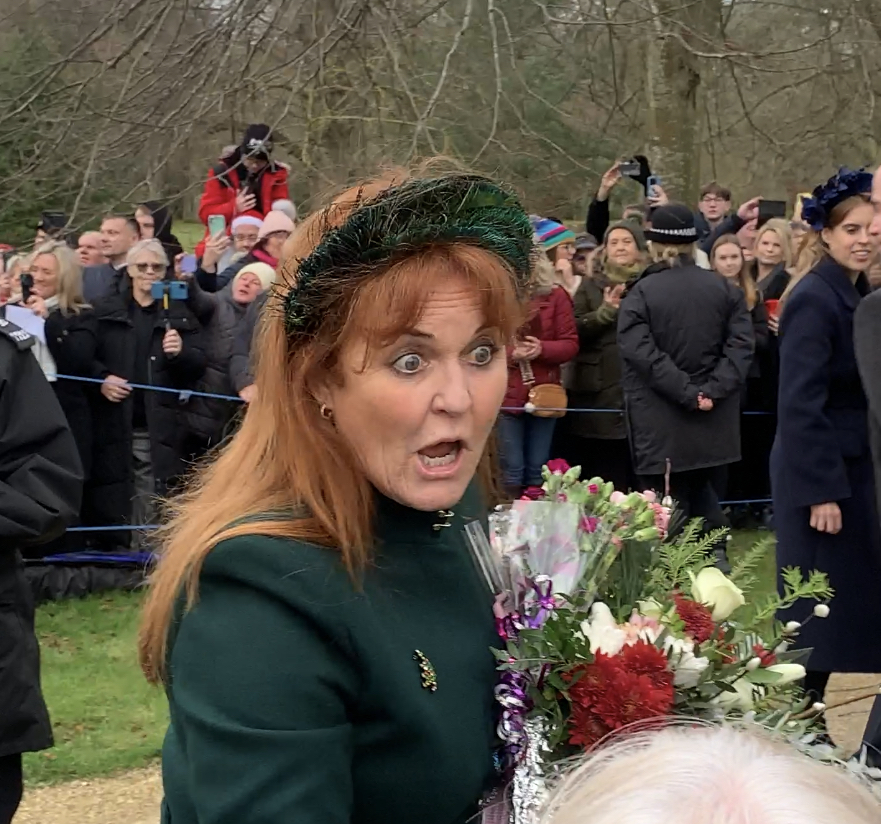
Ferguson on Christmas Day 2023

She attended the state funeral of Queen Elizabeth II in September 2022, and was seated beside her daughters, but she was not invited to the coronation of King Charles III in May 2023.

On 25 December 2023, Ferguson joined the royal family for the Christmas service at St Mary Magdalene Church, Sandringham, marking her first attendance at the event since 1992.

The Lord Chamberlain's Office continued to list Ferguson as a member of the royal family until November 2025, alongside other extended family members such as Daniel Chatto and Mike Tindall.

== Personal life after divorce ==
After the divorce, the British tabloids continued to report on Ferguson's lifestyle. In 1995, a baggage handler at John F. Kennedy International Airport in New York City pleaded guilty to stealing her diamond necklace and bracelet, valued at $382,000.

Her first autobiography, My Story, was published in 1996 and received poor reviews. A second autobiography, Finding Sarah: A Duchess's Journey to Find Herself, was published in 2011 and addressed her financial difficulties and public challenges.

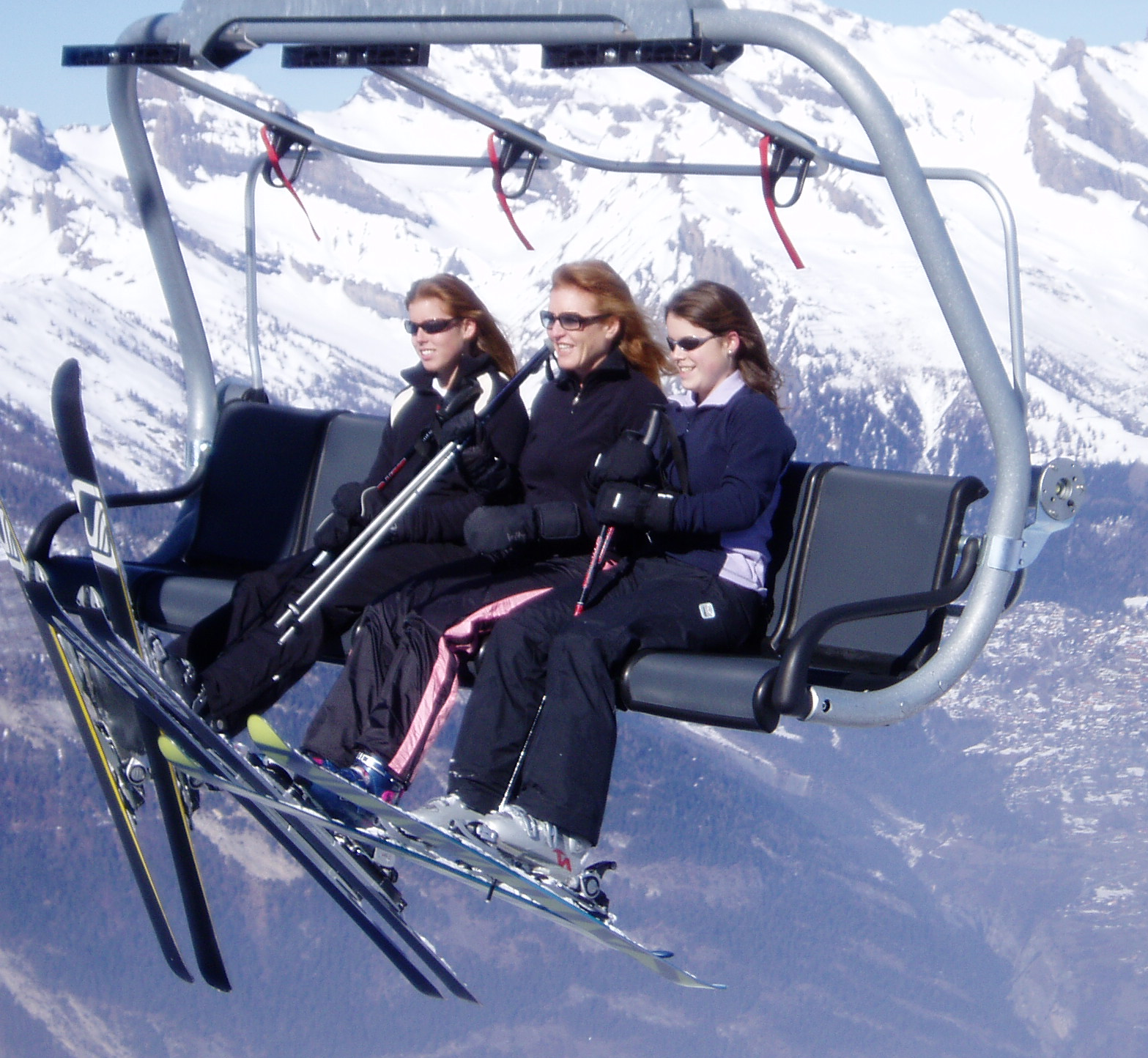
Ferguson and her daughters in Verbier, 2004

Until 2004, Ferguson and Andrew continued to share the family home, Sunninghill Park in Berkshire. That year, he moved to the refurbished Royal Lodge in Windsor Great Park, which had previously been the residence of his grandmother, Queen Elizabeth the Queen Mother, until she died in 2002. In 2007, Ferguson rented Dolphin House in Englefield Green, less than a mile from Royal Lodge. A small fire in the bathroom at Dolphin House in 2008 led her to vacate the property and move into Royal Lodge with Andrew.

In 2015, Ferguson was reported to have moved out of Royal Lodge and taken up residence in Verbier, Switzerland, where she and Andrew owned a £13 million chalet. She applied for Swiss residency the following year. As of 2016, she also maintained a rented apartment in Eaton Square, London. In 2025, she sold a townhouse in London's Belgravia for £3.85 million, having purchased it in 2022 for £4.25 million. The property had originally been bought as an investment for her daughters and had been rented to a tenant. She continued to live primarily at Royal Lodge until October 2025, when Buckingham Palace announced that formal notice had been served to Andrew to surrender his lease and that Ferguson would be making her own living arrangements. Since leaving Royal Lodge in early 2026, she had been seen at a wellness clinic in Austria and had reportedly stayed at her former boyfriend Paddy McNally's chalet in Verbier, Switzerland. In August 2026, it was reported that she was returning to the UK.

As one of the victims of the News International phone hacking scandal, which came into public attention in 2006, Ferguson received an undisclosed sum in an out-of-court settlement. In April 2016, she was named in the Panama Papers.

=== Debt problems ===
In the mid-1990s, Ferguson was reported to have had a £4.2 million deficit in her bank account, which she addressed by undertaking what was described as "a four-year earning spree" in the United States.

In 2006, using income from her work as a film producer and writer, she founded Hartmoor LLC in the US. The lifestyle company was intended to support her "career in publishing, media and public speaking". Hartmoor collapsed in 2009, leaving Ferguson with debts of £630,000. Later that year, it emerged that she was in a financial dispute with three firms, and in September she was summoned "to court in the UK for unpaid bills". By August 2010, reports suggested that she might declare voluntary bankruptcy with debts of around £5 million, although other sources estimated the figure at closer to £2 million.

Email exchanges released in February 2026 suggested that Ferguson might have been lent money by David Rowland and his private bank. In September 2009, a business contact wrote to financier Epstein stating that Ferguson had travelled to Nepal, "paying for the first class flight with her rowland [sic] bank loan." Reporting in The Telegraph at the time claimed that Rowland had paid off approximately £85,000 of Ferguson's debts, and that Epstein had settled other debts.

Ferguson became closely involved with entrepreneur Manuel Fernandez around 2015, publicly appearing with him and investing in his tech start-up vVoosh in 2016, while also joining the board of its affiliated charity. Despite her support, vVoosh filed for administration without ever launching a product, despite receiving more than £1 million in UK government research and development tax credits and raising about £9 million in total. Fernandez allegedly withdrew large sums and left the country, and the charity never conducted any work and was shut down. The Charity Commission later began the process of removing the vVoosh Charitable Foundation from the register for not operating and for being more than four-and-a-half years overdue in its reporting. Ferguson's involvement included a £36,000 loan from her company Gate Ventures and about 1% ownership via La Luna Investments, one of several struggling or dormant companies she controlled, including Coat Company Productions and Ginger & Moss, the latter of which faced significant debts. vVoosh owed £50,000 to La Luna Investments.

In June 2019, Andrew arranged a private tour of Buckingham Palace for Jay Bloom and Michael Evers, businessmen from the US cryptocurrency mining company Pegasus Group Holdings. This company had agreed to pay Ferguson up to £1.4 million for her role as a "brand ambassador". Bloom and Evers were driven in Andrew's car from their Knightsbridge hotel to the Palace. They later attended his Pitch@Palace event at St James's Palace before dining that evening with Ferguson, Andrew, and their daughter Beatrice. Ferguson was promoting Pegasus's plan to use thousands of solar power generators to mine Bitcoin in Arizona, though the project collapsed after acquiring only 615 of the planned 16,000 units and generating just $33,779 (£25,000) in cryptocurrency.

Ferguson earned more than £200,000 from Pegasus, stood to gain a £1.2 million bonus and company shares, and required first-class travel, five-star hotels, and professional stylists for up to four events. She first met Bloom in Las Vegas in 2018 and developed a business friendship that led to meetings at Buckingham Palace, St James's Palace, and the Royal Lodge, Windsor. Bloom and Evers regularly visited London in 2019, meeting the York family frequently. Bloom also made a second palace visit in July 2019. In October 2019, Ferguson signed a contract via Alphabet Capital, a British company owned by Adrian Gleave, through which she was paid over £200,000 for Pegasus work. Court documents showed Andrew also received £60,500 traced to Gleave's businesses, though neither explained the payments.

In May 2020, it was reported that Andrew and Ferguson were in a legal dispute over a debt from the 2014 purchase of their Swiss chalet. They had taken out a mortgage of £13.25 million and were expected to pay the remaining £5 million of the purchase price in cash instalments by the end of 2019; interest had increased this to £6.8 million. Despite reports that the Queen would assist them, a spokesperson for Andrew confirmed that she "will not be stepping in to settle the debt". The Times reported in September 2021 that Ferguson and Andrew had reached a legal agreement with the property's previous owner, and would sell the house to pay back their debt. The owner agreed to receive £3.4 million, half of the amount that she was owed, as she had been under the impression that Ferguson and Andrew were dealing with financial troubles.

=== Jeffrey Epstein ties ===
In March 2011, it was reported that Jeffrey Epstein, a convicted sex offender, had helped Ferguson avoid bankruptcy by paying £15,000 to an employee to whom she owed money. The payments were reportedly made after intervention from Andrew, who had a close friendship with Epstein for which he came under scrutiny in 2019. On 7 March 2011, she admitted getting money from Epstein and called it a "gigantic error of judgment". In the summer of 2011, Finding Sarah aired on the OWN network. One episode of the US-filmed reality series depicted Ferguson meeting with Suze Orman, the internationally known financial advisor, receiving from Orman a strict lecture and practical advice on how to resolve her financial issues. Juan Alessi, a staff member at Epstein's Florida residence for 12 years, said in an unsealed deposition that he believed Ferguson visited "only once and for a short time".

In September 2025, newspapers published emails showing that Ferguson had contacted Epstein in April 2011, despite her public statement in March 2011 that she had severed all ties with him. In the email, she wrote that Epstein was a "steadfast, generous and supreme friend" and said she must "humbly apologise" for her earlier remarks. According to her spokesperson, the apology followed what was described as a "Hannibal Lecter-style" phone call in which Epstein threatened to "destroy" her. Following renewed scrutiny prompted by the email's publication, seven charities, of which Ferguson was patron or ambassador (namely the Teenage Cancer Trust, Julia's House, Prevent Breast Cancer, the Natasha Allergy Research Foundation, the Children's Literacy Charity, British Heart Foundation, and the National Foundation for Retired Service Animals), individually announced or confirmed that they had ended their association with her.

In October 2025, The Mail on Sunday reported on leaked emails between Epstein and his lawyer in 2011 suggesting that Ferguson had celebrated Epstein's release from jail in 2009 by visiting him in New York, where she had taken her young daughters with her. A representative for Ferguson stated that neither she nor her daughters had any recollection of such a visit. However, email exchanges between Epstein and his assistant in July 2009 showed that the latter had bought "British Airways" flights for "the Duchess", totalling "for all tickets: $14,080.10", with another email detailing out a lunch meeting at Epstein's mansion in the same month to which Ferguson intended to be accompanied by her daughters. Another email sent by Ferguson in January 2010 reportedly showed that she was seeking more than the £15,000 she had previously admitted to taking, as she had asked for "50 or 100,000 US dollars to help get through the small bills that are pushing me over". An email sent by Epstein to a friend after Ferguson had publicly distanced herself from him in March 2011 implied that Epstein had bankrolled her for over 15 years.

In January 2026, documents released as part of the Epstein files included email exchanges between Ferguson and Epstein dating from April 2009, when he was under house arrest. In one message, she asked whether there was "any chance on my quick layover [in Palm Beach], that I can get to have a quick cup of tea..." to discuss ideas for her company, Mother's Army, and addressed Epstein as "My dear spectacular and special friend Jeffrey. You are a legend, and I am so proud of you". On 4 April 2009, she met him in person at his Florida Science Foundation office in West Palm Beach to drop off documents relating to her Mother's Army initiative. Another meeting planned for 20 April, when she was travelling to Canada from Grenada, did not take place; however, they spoke again by telephone on 5 May and met for a second time on 13 May. In June 2009, she emailed him to ask for his advice on how to "start The Mothers Army company so it can be commercial". The Mother's Army was set up by Ferguson "to help amplify the voices of Mothers all over the world". A further exchange in August 2009 shows Ferguson writing again to discuss "my Sarah Ferguson Brand" and thanking him "for being the brother I have always wished for". In September, she wrote to him about one woman: "You can marry her too. She is single and [sic] a great body. Ok well marry me and then we will employ her".

In October that year, she sought his assistance with her financial difficulties, writing: "I urgently need 20,000 pounds for rent today. The landlord has threatened to go to the newspapers if I don't pay. Any brainwaves?" Ferguson and Epstein also discussed her potential personal bankruptcy in a 2009 email chain with businessman David Stern. On 30 January 2010, she emailed Epstein saying, "I am at your service. Just marry me". In March 2010, a "Sarah" appeared to refer to Eugenie's love life in response to an email from Epstein, stating she was "Just waiting for Eugenie to come back from a shagging weekend!!". In July 2010, Epstein asked whether there was "any chance of your daughters saying hello" to his god-daughter Celina; Ferguson replied that Beatrice was in London with Andrew, though it is unclear whether any meeting took place. On 21 September 2011, she sent an email congratulating Epstein on the birth of a boy, adding that she was "here with love, friendship and congratualtions [sic]".

=== Cash for access ===
In May 2010, Ferguson was filmed by the News of the World offering Mazher Mahmood, an undercover reporter posing as an Indian businessman, access to Andrew (who was Special Representative for International Trade and Investment) for £500,000. On the video made as a documentary source for the story, which is publicly available, Ferguson is heard to say, "£500,000 when you can, to me, open doors". She is seen taking away a briefcase containing £40,000 in cash. Exposure surrounding the cash for access incident increased her public profile and notoriety.

Sterling Publishers substantially increased the print run of Ashley Learns About Strangers, Sarah's latest book for children; however, the notoriety did not translate into additional book sales. In an interview with Oprah Winfrey, titled Oprah and Sarah Ferguson, Duchess of York, Ferguson explained her behaviour by saying that she had been drinking before soliciting the cash, and was "in the gutter at that moment". She also claimed that her intention was initially to help a friend who "needed $38,000 (£28,000) urgently" but she ultimately asked for more money due to her own financial problems.

In November 2016, it was reported that Ferguson intended to sue News Group Newspapers (parent company of the News of the World) and its owner Rupert Murdoch for £25 million in damages citing her "loss in earnings" as well as the subsequent "distress" that the media sting brought to her as the main reasons. In January 2018, it was reported that the actual amount Ferguson was seeking was £45 million.

In March 2022, it was reported that the wife of jailed Turkish politician İlhan İşbilen alleged that Ferguson received at least £225,000 from businessman Selman Turk, whom Mrs İşbilen is suing for fraud. An additional £25,000 was sent by Turk in October 2019 to the bank account of Ferguson's younger daughter, Eugenie, the second instalment of which was referenced "birthday gift", reportedly "to pay for a surprise birthday party for the Duchess". Ferguson was owed £225,000 by Pegasus Group Holdings for her role as brand ambassador, but she received the full amount from Turk, who was then set to reclaim the money from Pegasus.

=== 2012 Turkey legal incident ===
On 13 January 2012, the Ministry of Justice of Turkey issued an international arrest warrant for Ferguson. She had travelled to Turkey in 2008 and covertly filmed a Turkish state orphanage. The Turkish authorities alleged that Ferguson made a false declaration when entering the country (in regard to her motives for visiting Turkey), trespassed into a Turkish Government institution, and also invaded the privacy of children. These charges carry sentences of up to 22 years imprisonment. Turkey and Britain have an extradition treaty; however, Home Office officials have stated:

Under UK extradition law a judge must order the discharge of [an extradition request] if it is not an offence under UK law and in the country requesting extradition. In this case there is no offence in UK law so there will be no extradition.

Turkey maintains that Ferguson distorted information about the orphanage and used an isolated incident in a smear campaign against the Republic of Turkey. Turkey invited international human rights organisations to inspect any orphanage of its choosing to show its transparency in relation to the issue.

On 5 May 2012, the trial began into the charges brought by the Ankara State Prosecutor's office. Cansu Şahin, representing Ferguson, who was not present, told the Ankara court that her client has apologised and would like to plea-bargain with the prosecution.

=== Health ===
In June 2023, it was announced that Ferguson had been diagnosed with an early form of breast cancer following a routine mammogram. She successfully underwent a single mastectomy at King Edward VII's Hospital, and her doctors stated her prognosis as "good". She also underwent reconstructive surgery following her mastectomy.

In January 2024, it was announced that Ferguson had been diagnosed with melanoma after having several moles removed for analysis.

== Charity work ==
Since her marriage, and continuing after the divorce, Ferguson has been involved with a number of charities.

From 1990 until 2025, Ferguson served as patron of the Teenage Cancer Trust. Over those years, she opened many of the charity's specialist units, including those at Middlesex Hospital, University College London, St James's University Hospital, Cardiff University Hospital and Royal Marsden Hospital. She began her work with people suffering from motor neurone disease in the 1990s. In her capacity as patron of the Motor Neurone Disease Association, she promoted fundraising campaigns for research about the disease and later became president of the International Alliance for ALS. To help and support those affected by drug misuse, she joined therapy sessions at the Chemical Dependency Centre and was later made their patron. In 1993, Ferguson founded Children in Crisis, a children's charity focused on education and grant making to international programmes. She serves as founder and life president. She founded the charity after meeting a young cancer victim named Ania during her visit to Poland in 1992.

In December 1994, Ferguson went to the US to take part in a fundraising event for Peace Links and to launch her own charity, Chances for Children, in the US. Her decision to launch a fundraising event for her charity in the US was criticised by the British press, who claimed that through her Budgie the Little Helicopter series she was "expected to earn 400 million pounds over the next five years, with 3 million pounds a year going into her royal pocket" despite her promise to donate part of her earnings to charity. The claims were denied by Ferguson's representative, and she later responded to the criticism by saying, "What you all must understand is that the Budgie books were produced in 1987. That's when I gave a large percentage to charity. ... And maybe after costs, after the animation is made, after everything else and the popcorn and everything else, then perhaps in five to ten years, maybe I might receive a little bit of my percentage, and that I hope will be at that time going back into Chances for Children". "Little Red", the doll that was used as a logo for her American charity, later inspired her to write a series of books named after the doll. The proceeds from selling the doll also went to Chances for Children.

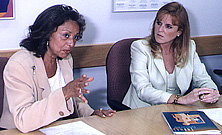
Ferguson and Vivian Pinn, NIH associate director for women's health, at the National Institutes of Health Clinical Center, Bethesda, Maryland, United States, June 1998

In June 1998, Ferguson made a brief trip to Bethesda to receive an award from the Journal of Women's Health. She also visited the National Institutes of Health (NIH) Clinical Center. NIH associate director for communications said, "The Duchess has many opportunities to talk to women via television, at lectures and through print media interviews" and was interested "in learning from NIH scientists what major health messages she should deliver to women, based on the research conducted through NIH." Ferguson, whose elder daughter Beatrice was diagnosed with dyslexia at the age of seven, became a patron of Springboard for Children, a charity that helps students who struggle with reading and writing. Ferguson has also described herself as "a little bit dyslexic".

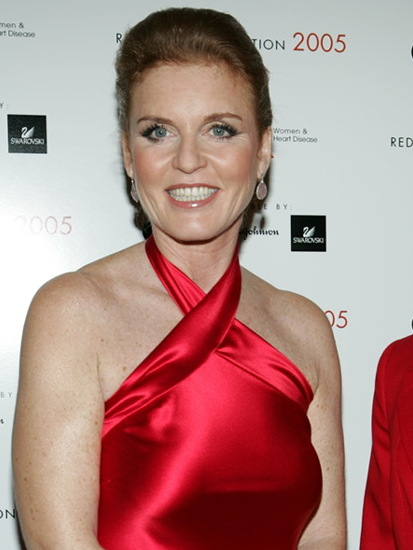
Ferguson at The Heart Truth Red Dress Collection 2005 Fashion Show, in her role as ambassador of The Heart Truth

Ferguson was scheduled to appear at the World Trade Center on 11 September 2001 for the Chances of Children charity event, but her car reached the site just after the first plane struck the towers.

In 2003, Ferguson joined the American Cancer Society at a congressional briefing. She was a founding supporter of the American Cancer Society's Great American Weigh In, an annual campaign (modelled after the Society's Great American Smoke Out) aimed at raising awareness of the link between excess weight and cancer.

In 2004, Ferguson was named the official spokesperson of SOS Children's Villages – USA and in 2005 she became a global ambassador for Ronald McDonald House Charities. In 2006, she established The Sarah Ferguson Foundation based in Toronto, which derived funds from Ferguson's commercial work and private donations with the aim of supporting charities internationally that serve children and families in dire need. Included under this umbrella organisation was her patronage and support of several British charities, including Mental Disability Rights International, the African-Caribbean Leukaemia Trust, Tommy's, the Motor Neurone Disease Association, and CARE International. In 2009, it was reported that despite its income of £250,000 over 18 months, the foundation had spent only £14,200 on grants, £6,300 of which was given to the charitable arm of a South African private game reserve owned by Sir Richard Branson, a friend of Ferguson's. Following the report, the foundation released a list that showed they spent around $400,000 on donations in 2008.

In 2007, Ferguson joined the Advisory Council of the Ophelia Project, an American initiative aimed to support people dealing with relational and other non-physical forms of aggression. In 2008, Ferguson became patron of Humanitas, a charity focused on providing children with education, healthcare and family support. In the same year, she became an ambassador for New York mayor Michael Bloomberg's anti-poverty campaign. In 2010, Ferguson became a supporter of the Mullany Fund, whose aim is to support British students wishing to study medicine or physiotherapy. In 2011, Ferguson became the global ambassador for Not For Sale, a charity focused on human slavery. In 2013, Ferguson, along with her former husband and their daughters, Beatrice and Eugenie, founded Key To Freedom, a business structure for women in vulnerable situations in India who can sell their wares through the British retailer Topshop. In 2014, Ferguson was appointed an ambassador for the Institute of Global Health Innovation at Imperial College London. In 2015, Ferguson revealed her connection with India and polo when she attended as a chief guest of HVR Baroda Cup in New Delhi under the invitation of Harshavardhan Reddy, chairman of HVR Sports.

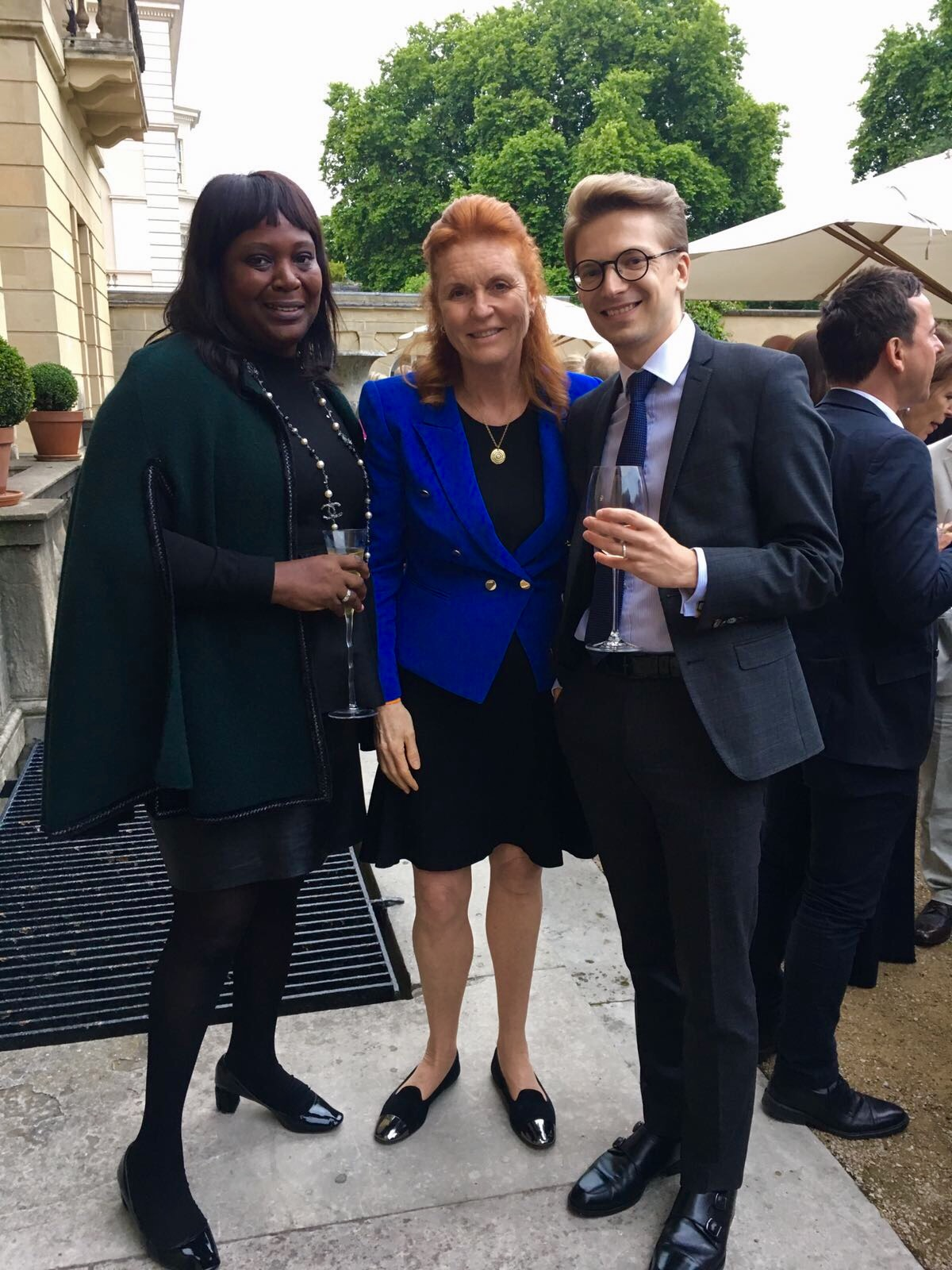
Ferguson with Heather Melville and Marcis Skadmanis in Lancaster House, London, June 2017

In 2016, Ferguson collaborated with British contemporary artist Teddy McDonald and her daughters, Princess Beatrice and Princess Eugenie, to create the first Royal contemporary painting. Titled Royal Love, it was painted on the lawn of Royal Lodge and features positive thoughts and quotes by Ferguson and the princesses. The painting was exhibited in London at the Masterpiece Art Fair, Chelsea in June/July 2016 and later auctioned at private dinner. The proceeds from the sale of the painting were donated by McDonald to the charity Children in Crisis. British GQ magazine published an exclusive on the creation of the painting. In 2017, Ferguson was joined by her daughter Eugenie to mark the second anniversary of the Teenage Cancer Trust unit at Alder Hey Children's Hospital.

On the 25th anniversary of Children in Crisis's foundation in 2018, Ferguson said that working with this charity "gave her a sense of perspective and purpose during tough times". She merged her charity foundation with Street Child, an organisation run by Tom Dannatt in Bangladesh, Afghanistan and Sierra Leone, of which Ferguson has become a patron, and her daughters, Beatrice and Eugenie, are the ambassadors.

From June 2019 until September 2025, Ferguson served as patron of the Natasha Allergy Research Foundation, an organisation established in memory of Natasha Ednan-Laperouse, who died in 2016 after suffering an allergic reaction to a baguette. She became an ambassador for the technology infrastructure company Pegasus Group Holdings. Ferguson was chosen to initiate "the company's philanthropic endeavors" as they develop an "off-grid renewable energy data center".

In June 2020, Ferguson launched her new charitable foundation called Sarah's Trust. The charity provided aid for NHS, care home and hospice staff by delivering more than 150,000 items, including food, masks, scrubs, and toiletries. Organisations such as Under One Sky and NOAH Enterprise have helped the foundation by giving sleeping bags to homeless people in the UK. Essentials and supplies have also been sent to Ghana. In March 2022, Ferguson visited Denver after being chosen as the keynote speaker at a Junior League of Denver fundraiser. In the same month, she travelled to Poland amid the Russian invasion of Ukraine to meet with Ukrainian refugees and help her charity the Sarah's Trust in organising goods donated by UK citizens. In the following month, she travelled to Albania and met Afghan refugees at a resort in Golem. In her capacity as chief ambassador of the Montessori Group, Ferguson visited Croatia in June 2022 where she promoted the organisation's work on providing help for Ukrainian refugees and supporting children. In July 2022, her charity secured money to fund £14,000-worth of computers for Ukrainian refugees in Poland. She also helped with setting up the 'Play in a Box' tent in Upper Silesia to host refugee children for reading, playing, and baking. In December 2022, she hosted a choir for the blind from Kharkiv's Special Training Educational Complex during their visit to the UK, for which she was awarded with a certificate and badge from Poland's National Institute for the Blind.

In March 2024, Ferguson co-chaired the Global Citizen NOW summit in Melbourne, Australia with the aim to end extreme poverty and address the climate crisis.

In February 2026, Sarah's Trust announced that it would close for the "foreseeable future" after months of internal discussion. The announcement followed the release of court documents related to Epstein, which detailed Ferguson's continued contact with him.

== Business life ==
=== Film and television ===
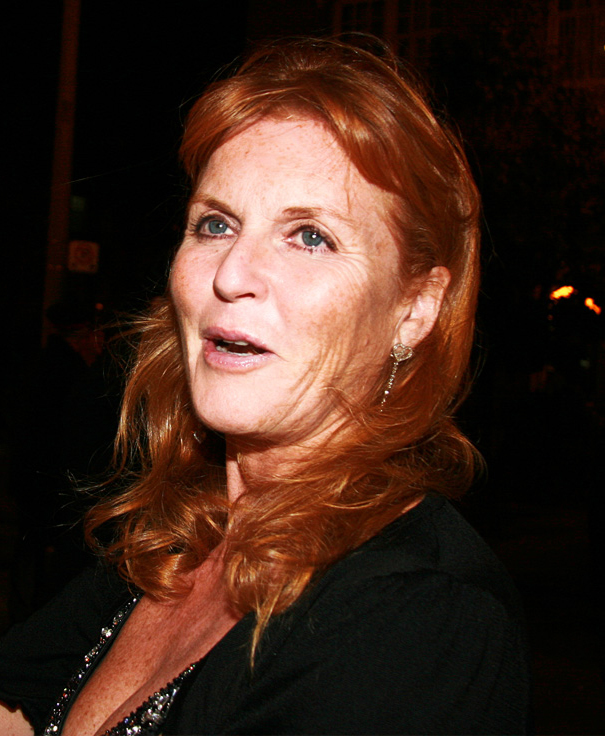
Ferguson at the 2009 Toronto International Film Festival

In 2000, Ferguson co-produced and served as presenter in a documentary for BBC television called In Search of the Spirit. In September 2003, she was a co-host for three days on BBC Radio 2's afternoon show Steve Wright. In May 2004, Ferguson hosted an eleven-minute production featurette on Universal's DVD Peter Pan, titled The Legacy of Pan. Five months later, Walt Disney Feature Animation released a DVD short The Cat That Looked at a King, with Ferguson's voice in the role of the Queen; the story is derived from the Mary Poppins books by P. L. Travers.

In 2008, Ferguson was a special correspondent to NBC's Today for which she presented segments for a series called "From the Heart". In May 2008, her two-part film The Duchess in Hull premiered on ITV1, showing Ferguson helping a family on a council estate in Hull to improve their lifestyle. In the same year she travelled to Romania and Turkey for the documentary Duchess and Daughters: Their Secret Mission, shown on ITV1 on 6 November 2008, investigating poor treatment and conditions in children's institutions in those two countries. In August 2009, her documentary The Duchess on the Estate, which was about Northern Moor, Manchester, was shown on the same network. Her report on the suburb area in Manchester caused criticism for exaggerating crime in the area.

Ferguson had a producing role in the 2009 Jean-Marc Vallée film The Young Victoria, starring Emily Blunt and featuring a background player role for Ferguson's daughter Princess Beatrice. It was Ferguson who conceived the idea for a film based upon the early years of Queen Victoria. Since her marriage, she had been interested in the Queen, and had written two books about her with the help of a historian. The Victoria-Albert relationship in particular drew her into the queen's history, as she believed there were parallels between their marriage and her own with Andrew, as they both "fought for their love" in the midst of public scrutiny.

Ferguson had the leading role on Finding Sarah, a mini-series on Oprah Winfrey Network which premiered in June 2011. She talked about her struggles through life and financial issues in the show.

In 2019, Ferguson said that she was producing a TV documentary about Prince Albert's mother Princess Louise of Saxe-Gotha-Altenburg. The documentary would focus on her life, particularly her separation from her husband Ernest I, Duke of Saxe-Coburg and Gotha. In July 2020, it was reported that Ferguson had been a judge on the pilot for Fox's Dancing with Horses but the production and distribution were halted due to the COVID-19 pandemic.

In October 2025, it was reported that Ferguson had been dropped from ITV's Loose Women and This Morning as a guest after insiders said there were no plans for any future appearances.

=== Other ventures ===
Ferguson's commercial interests have included an eleven-year endorsement with Weight Watchers and product development and promotion with Wedgwood and Avon. In the 2000s she designed a set of tea-scented candles for Bath & Body Works, and in 2007 she raised the possibility of launching a Duchess Originals homeware range, similar to the then-Prince Charles's Duchy Originals. In 2020, it was reported that she could possibly launch a lifestyle brand, Duchess Inc., and later in the year designed a range of tea and biscuits called the Duchess Collection in aid of her charity Sarah's Trust.

In April 2020, Ferguson launched a new series on her YouTube channel, called Storytime with Fergie and Friends, in which she and a number of authors, including Nanette Newman and Imogen Edwards-Jones, read stories to children from their homes during the lockdowns due to the COVID-19 pandemic. From March to July 2021, the same channel showed 10 short episodes of Little Red News featuring characters from Ferguson's book series, Little Red.

In May 2022, she co-founded the independent production house Vestapol Films, which is based in Paris. In May 2023, she launched the weekly podcast Tea Talks with the Duchess & Sarah together with Sarah Thomson, which premiered in June 2023.

== Notable appearances on TV and radio ==
- In the United Kingdom:
  - She participated in the programme The Grand Knockout Tournament, informally known as It's a Royal Knockout, on 15 June 1987, in which four teams sponsored by her, the then Duke of York, the Princess Royal, and Prince Edward competed for charity. The programme was criticised by the media and it was later reported that the Queen was not in favour of the event, with her courtiers having advised against it.
  - The Vicar of Dibley in 1999.
  - Parkinson in 2003.
  - The Meredith Vieira Show in 2015, discussing her former husband's alleged sex scandal.
  - This Morning in 2019 to discuss "Natasha's Law". She guest-edited and co-hosted an episode in 2023.
- In the United States:
  - The Oprah Winfrey Show in 1996 and 1999. In 2010, she was interviewed for a special episode on the same show, titled Oprah and Sarah Ferguson, Duchess of York, in which she discussed the "cash for access" scandal.
  - In May 1998, Ferguson made a cameo in the fourth-season finale of the American television sitcom Friends.
- In Australia:
  - In 2013, Ferguson was interviewed for an episode of Nine Network's 60 Minutes, titled "Seeing Red".

== Cultural references ==
- She was caricatured in the satirical puppet show Spitting Image, "with horsey teeth amid a mane of frizzy ginger hair".
- The 2006 title of R&B/hip-hop artist Stacy "Fergie" Ferguson's debut solo album, The Dutchess (dutchess is a variant spelling of duchess dating to the 17th century) was a reference to the fact that the two are associated with the same nickname. According to The Boston Globe, Ferguson contacted Fergie after the release of her album and remarked: "Fergie, it's Fergie... Now that you've done this, you have to sing at a concert for my foundation, 'Children in Crisis'". The singer later performed at the event.
- Between 2016 and 2020, a fictional version of her was portrayed by Katy Wix in the British sitcom The Windsors.
- In 2020, Ferguson was portrayed briefly by English actress Jessica Aquilina in the fourth season of Netflix's The Crown.
- The 2024 series A Very Royal Scandal, which depicted the events surrounding the 2019 BBC interview between the then Prince Andrew and Emily Maitlis, featured Claire Rushbrook in the role of Ferguson.
- She was portrayed by Natalie Dormer in the 2026 British drama series The Lady.
- In March 2026, Ferguson was parodied by Emma Sidi in a Saturday Night Live UK cold open, in which she was depicted as an MI5 agent whose role was to make other members of the royal family appear more favourable by comparison.

== Titles, styles, honours and arms ==
=== Titles and styles ===
Monogram used by Ferguson

During her marriage, Ferguson was styled "Her Royal Highness The Duchess of York". On 21 August 1996, letters patent issued by Elizabeth II declared that former wives of British princes, other than widows who did not remarry, were not entitled to the style of Her Royal Highness. Meanwhile, divorced peeresses (such as duchesses) cannot "claim the privileges or status of Peeresses which they derived from their husbands", but may continue to use the peeress title. The Royal Household referred to Ferguson as "Sarah, Duchess of York", but on at least two occasions (the announcements of the engagements of her daughters), she was referred to together with her former husband as "The Duke and Duchess of York".

On 17 October 2025, following her former husband Andrew's agreement to cease using his peerage titles, it was reported that Ferguson would no longer use "Duchess of York" as a courtesy title. On 21 October, she removed the title from her social media page handles.

=== Honours ===
==== Academic honours ====
- 1991–1995: University of Salford, Chancellor
- 2016–2021: University of Huddersfield, Visiting professor of Philanthropreneurship

==== Appointments ====
- 1988: Honorary Freeman and Liveryman of the Worshipful Company of Stationers and Newspaper Makers

Freedom of the City

- 23 February 1987 – 26 March 2026: Freedom of the City of York

==== Other honours and awards ====
- The rose cultivar Rosa 'Duchess of York' was named in her honour in 1994.
- In 1998, Ferguson received the Journal of Women's Health Award from Bernadine Healy.
- In 2001, she received Redbook magazine's "Mothers & Shakers" Award.
- In 2004, she received Woman's Day magazine's "Women Who Inspire Us" Award.
- In February 2007, she was named Mother of the Year by the American Cancer Society.
- In 2007, she received the ONE X ONE Difference Award for humanitarian work benefiting children worldwide, presented at the Toronto Film Festival.
- In June 2018, she received the Humanitarian Award at the Filming Italy Sardegna Festival for her work with Children in Crisis.
- In June 2019, she received the Inspiration of the Year Award at Hello!'s Star Women Awards for her work with charity organisations, including Street Child.
- In July 2022, she received the Global Humanitarian award at the 25th Magna Grecia Awards.
- In April 2023, she received the Golden Heart Award at the Women Changing the World Awards for her humanitarian work.
- In November 2023, she received the Red Cross International Award in recognition of her philanthropic activities.
- In March 2024, The Independent included her on its "Influence List".

=== Arms ===
Coat of arms of Sarah Ferguson
| Adopted 1996 Escutcheon Or, growing out of a mound between two leaves three thistle stalks Vert blossomed Purpure all conjoined in base, alighting on the middle blossom a honeybee Or and Sable winged Argent. Motto EX ADVERSIS FELICITAS CRESCIT (Latin: From adversity grows happiness) Other versions During her marriage Ferguson's arms were impaled with those of her husband, Prince Andrew. They were emblazoned as follows: Quarterly 1st and 4th gules three lions passant guardant in pale or 2nd or a lion rampant gules within a double tressure flory counterflory gules 3rd azure a harp or stringed argent; impaled with a shield Or, growing out of a mound between two leaves three thistle stalks Vert blossomed Purpure all conjoined in base, alighting on the middle blossom a honeybee Or and Sable winged Argent. Supporters Dexter a lion rampant gardant Or imperially crowned proper, sinister a unicorn argent, armed, crined and unguled Or, gorged with a coronet Or composed of crosses patée and fleurs de lis a chain affixed thereto passing between the forelegs and reflexed over the back also Or. Coronet Coronet of a child of the sovereign |

== Ancestors ==
Ancestors of Sarah Ferguson

8. Algernon Francis Holford Ferguson
4. Andrew Henry Ferguson
9. Margaret Brand
2. Ronald Ferguson
10. Lord Herbert Montagu Douglas Scott
5. Marian Montagu Douglas Scott
11. Marie Josephine Edwards
1. Sarah Ferguson
12. Henry FitzHerbert Wright
6. FitzHerbert Wright
13. Muriel Harriet Fletcher
3. Susan Wright
14. Mervyn Richard Wingfield, 8th Viscount Powerscourt
7. Doreen Wingfield
15. Sybil Pleydell-Bouverie

== Bibliography ==
=== Books ===
- Autobiographies and memoirs:
  - 1996, My Story ISBN 978-0684835815
  - 2003, What I Know Now: Simple Lessons Learned the Hard Way ISBN 978-1416578413
  - 2011, Finding Sarah: A Duchess's Journey to Find Herself ISBN 978-1439189542
- Budgie the Little Helicopter books and 1994 animated children's television series:
  - 1989, Budgie the Little Helicopter ISBN 978-0671676834
  - 1989, Budgie at Bendick's Point ISBN 978-0689808494
  - 1991, Budgie and the Blizzard ISBN 978-0671734756
  - 1992, The Adventures of Budgie ISBN 978-0671792497
  - 1995, Budgie Books – S and S USA ISBN 978-0750096638
  - 1996, Budgie Goes to Sea ISBN 978-0689808500
  - 2021, Budgie the Helicopter Rescues Kubbie the Koala
- About Queen Victoria:
  - 1991, Victoria and Albert: A Family Life at Osborne House ISBN 978-0139508820
  - 1993, Travels with Queen Victoria ISBN 978-0297831952
- For young girls:
  - 1996, The Royal Switch ISBN 978-0440412137
  - 1997, Bright Lights ISBN 978-0440412168
- Lifestyle books with Weight Watchers:
  - 1998, Dieting with The Duchess ISBN 978-0684857459
  - 1999, Dining with The Duchess ISBN 978-0684852164
  - 2000, Win the Weight Game ISBN 978-0684870786
  - 2001, Reinventing Yourself with the Duchess of York ISBN 978-1439146194
  - 2002, Energy Breakthrough: Jump-start Your Weight Loss and Feel Great ISBN 978-0743232869
  - 2009, foreword in Weight Watchers Start Living, Start Losing: Inspirational Stories That Will Motivate You Now ISBN 978-0470189146
- Little Red series:
  - 2003, Little Red ISBN 978-1416918530
  - 2004, Little Red's Christmas Story ISBN 978-1442430761
  - 2006, Little Red's Summer Adventure ISBN 978-0689875717
  - 2009, Little Red to the Rescue ISBN 978-0689875656
  - 2009, Little Red's Autumn Adventure ISBN 978-0689843419
- Helping Hands series:
  - 2007, Charlie and the Bullies ISBN 978-1906260095
  - 2007, Harry Starts to Enjoy His Food ISBN 978-1906260064
  - 2007, Get Well Soon, Adam ISBN 978-1402774010
  - 2007, Lauren's Moving Day ISBN 978-1402773983
  - 2007, Healthy Food for Dylan ISBN 978-1402774003
  - 2007, Sophie Makes Friends ISBN 978-1906260118
  - 2007, Dalia Says Goodbye to Grandpa ISBN 978-1906260071
  - 2007, Simon Gets Better ISBN 978-1906260026
  - 2007, Emily Mover Home ISBN 978-1906260002
  - 2010, Ashley Learns about Strangers ISBN 978-1402773938
  - 2010, Emily's First Day of School ISBN 978-1402773921
  - 2010, Michael and His New Baby Brother ISBN 978-1402773907
  - 2010, Matthew and the Bullies ISBN 978-1402773914
  - 2011, When Katie's Parents Separated ISBN 978-1402773952
  - 2011, Zach Gets Some Exercise ISBN 978-1402773990
  - 2011, Jacob Goes to the Doctor and Sophie Visits the Dentist ISBN 978-1402773969
  - 2011, Molly Makes Friends ISBN 978-1402773976
  - 2011, Olivia Says Goodbye to Grandpa ISBN 978-1402773945
  - 2019, James and the Bullies ISBN 978-1916105218
  - 2020, Holly's First Day at School ISBN 978-1916105232
  - 2020, Daisy Learns about Strangers ISBN 978-1916105225
- Genie Gems series:
  - 2020, Genie Gems: Mission to Devon ISBN 978-0648803164
  - 2020, Genie Gems Meets Arthur Fantastic ISBN 978-0648803126
- Puddle Boots series:
  - 2021, Puddle Boots ISBN 978-0645099676
  - 2021, Puddle Boots Christmas ISBN 978-0645355949
- About Margaret and Mary Montagu Douglas Scott:
  - 2021, Her Heart for a Compass ISBN 978-0062976529
  - 2023, A Most Intriguing Lady ISBN 978-0008512972
    - 2024, A Woman of Intrigue ISBN 978-0008513016
- The Southport series:
  - 2022, Demon's Land ISBN 978-0645355994
  - 2022, Field of Sky ISBN 978-0645516296
- Flora & Fern series:
  - 2024, Flora & Fern: Wonder in the Woods ISBN 978-1915167866
  - 2025, Flora & Fern: Kindness Along the Way ISBN 978-1917487214 (withdrawn from sale)
- 1988, A Guard Within ISBN 978-0394758343
- 1989, Skiing from the Inside: The Self-help Guide to Mastering the Slopes ISBN 978-0671697112
- 2003, Moments ISBN 978-1862055735
- 2008, Tea for Ruby ISBN 978-1442426337
- 2008, Hartmoor ISBN 978-1405054126
- 2012, Ballerina Rosie ISBN 978-1442430679
- 2020, The Enchanted Oak Tree ISBN 978-0648840848
- 2020, A Gift of Kindness
- 2021, The Adventures of Charlie, Blue and Larry Lamp Post ISBN 978-0645268904
- 2021, What's Under Your Hat, Granny? ISBN 978-0645218312
- 2023, The Girl on the Ceiling ISBN 978-0645355932
- 2024. Fabulous Food Art. ISBN 978-1763619487

=== Authored articles ===
- Ferguson, Sarah (13 July 2018). "Street Child can take the work I started 25 years ago to even more children". Evening Standard.
- Sarah, Duchess of York (11 February 2019). "#HelloToKindness: Duchess of York writes heartfelt open letter about 'sewer' of social media". Hello!.
- Ferguson, Sarah (31 March 2021). "As a result of the pandemic, young people with cancer need our support more than ever". The Telegraph.
- Ferguson, Sarah (21 April 2023). "Now I'm a grandma, I'm terrified about climate change". The Telegraph.
- Sarah, Duchess of York (24 March 2025). "Sarah, Duchess of York writes emotional letter that will resonate with parents". Hello!.
- Ferguson, Sarah (23 April 2025). "Amplify the voices of teens with cancer, says Sarah Ferguson". The Times.
- Ferguson, Sarah (4 May 2025). "I know what it's like to suffer cruel scrutiny and fear social media's impact on our children, writes Sarah Ferguson". LBC.

Academic offices
| Preceded by The Duke of Edinburgh | Chancellor of the University of Salford; 1991–1995 | Succeeded by Sir Walter Bodmer |
