= Finding Sarah =

Finding Sarah may refer to:

- Finding Sarah: From Royalty to the Real World, 2011 American documentary television series following the life of Sarah, Duchess of York
- Finding Sarah: A Duchess's Journey to Find Herself, 2011 autobiography by Sarah, Duchess of York
