= List of British royal memoirs =

The following is a list of memoirs and autobiographies published by members of the British royal family.

== List ==
Image	Name	Title	Year	Publisher	Ref.
	Queen Victoria	Leaves from the Journal of Our Life in the Highlands from 1848 to 1861	1868	Smith, Elder	
	Queen Victoria	More Leaves from the Journal of Our Life in the Highlands from 1862 to 1882	1884	Smith, Elder	
	Prince Edward, Duke of Windsor (formerly Edward VIII)	A King's Story: The Memoirs of H.R.H. the Duke of Windsor	1951	Cassell and Co.	
	Princess Marie Louise of Schleswig-Holstein	My Memories of Six Reigns	1956	Evans Brothers Ltd	
	Wallis, Duchess of Windsor	The Heart Has Its Reasons: The Memoirs of the Duchess of Windsor	1956	Michael Joseph	
	Princess Alice, Countess of Athlone	For My Grandchildren: Some Reminiscences of Her Royal Highness Princess Alice, Countess of Athlone	1966	Evans Brothers Ltd	OCLC 654367087
	Princess Alice, Duchess of Gloucester	The Memoirs of Princess Alice, Duchess of Gloucester	1983	Collins	ISBN 0002166461
	Princess Alice, Duchess of Gloucester	Memories of Ninety Years	1991	Collins & Brown Ltd	ISBN 1855850486
	Anne, Princess Royal	Riding Through My Life	1991	Pelham Books	ISBN 9780720719611
	Sarah Ferguson	My Story	1996	Simon & Schuster	ISBN 9780684835815
	Sarah Ferguson	What I Know Now: Simple Lessons Learned the Hard Way	2003	Simon & Schuster	ISBN 9780743246125
	Sarah Ferguson	Finding Sarah: A Duchess's Journey to Find Herself	2011	Simon & Schuster	ISBN 9781439189542
	Princess Michael of Kent	A Cheetah's Tale	2017	Bradt	ISBN 9781784770693
	Prince Edward, Duke of Kent	A Royal Life	2022	Hodder & Stoughton	ISBN 9781529389708
	Prince Harry, Duke of Sussex	Spare	2023	Penguin Random House	ISBN 9780593593806

== Other authorised biographies ==
Some members of the royal family have collaborated with biographers on books that have subsequently been described as 'authorised'. Diana, Princess of Wales collaborated with Andrew Morton on the 1992 book Diana: Her Story, recording answers on tape to questions he gave her and allowing access to her friends to be interviewed. The 1994 biography of King Charles III, The Prince of Wales: A Biography by Jonathan Dimbleby was authorised by Charles. A spokesperson from St James's Palace described it as an 'authorised account' that was produced with Charles's co-operation. Dimbleby's book extensively quoted from Charles's diaries, journals and letters and from interviews with Charles and people close to him. The biography of Prince Harry, Duke of Sussex and Meghan, Duchess of Sussex by Omid Scobie and Carolyn Durand titled Finding Freedom was written with the couple's contribution and published in 2020.

Official biographers have also been appointed to provide an account of a royal's life posthumously, including John Wheeler-Bennett for King George VI (King George VI: His Life and Reign, 1958), James Pope-Hennessy for Queen Mary (Queen Mary, 1959), and William Shawcross for Queen Elizabeth the Queen Mother (Queen Elizabeth The Queen Mother: The Official Biography, 2009). In April 2026, Anna Keay was announced as the writer of Queen Elizabeth II's authorised biography.

== See also ==
- Queen Victoria's journals
