= Teddy McDonald =

British artist

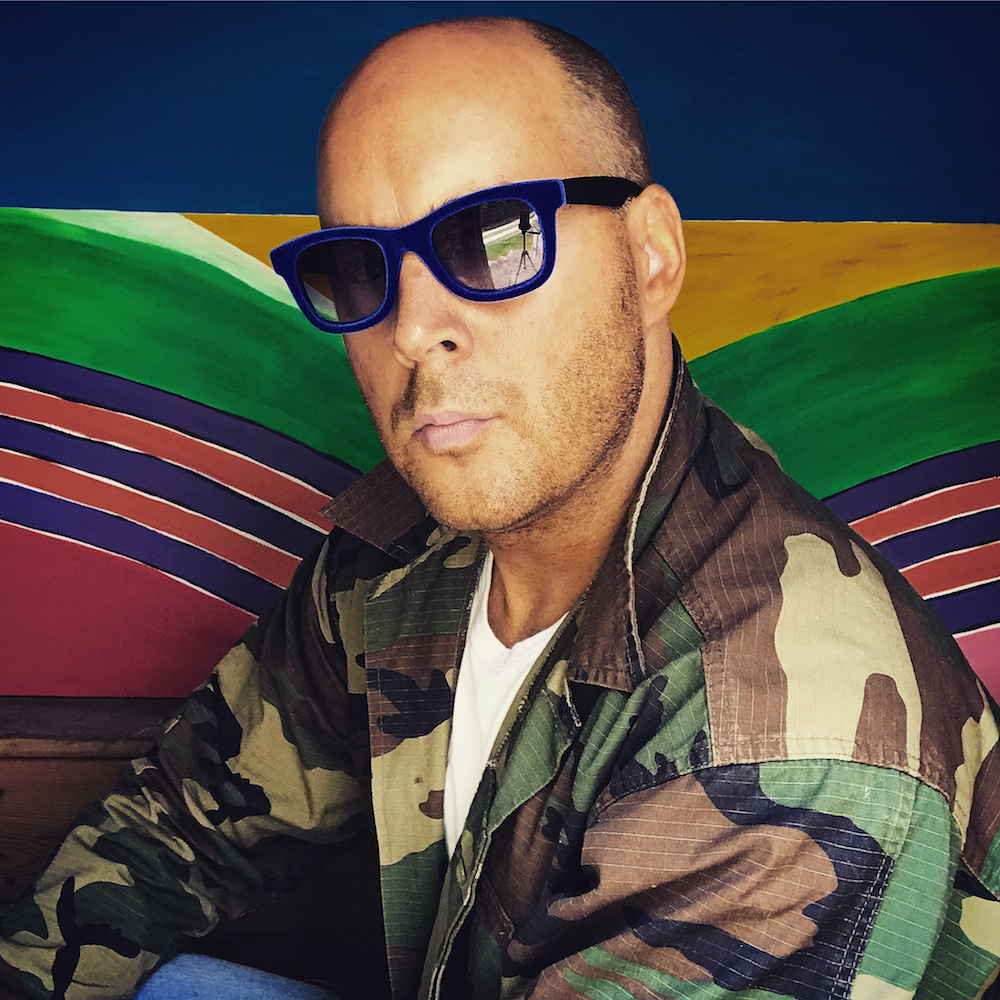
- Occupations: Artist, designer
- Known for: Contemporary art, design
- Website: teddymcdonald.art

Teddy McDonald is a British contemporary artist. He has painted guitars used by Ed Sheeran, painted with members of the royal family, and painted a Range Rover Autobiography Art Car.

== Work ==
McDonald loaned a guitar named "Green T" to Ed Sheeran, who played it on his X Tour. It was one of the first Ed Sheeran items to go to auction, and when Bonhams sold it in December 2015 it doubled its estimate. Sheeran also commissioned a guitar that was a collaboration between McDonald and New York street artist John Matos aka Crash. Sheeran played the 'Crash x Teddy M' Fender Stratocaster at the Glastonbury Festival, 2017.

McDonald collaborated with Princess Beatrice, Princess Eugenie and Sarah, Duchess of York on a charity project. The members of the royal family, working on the lawn of Royal Lodge in May 2016, added their own 'graffiti' to a painting titled "Royal Love", which was exhibited at Masterpiece London and then sold, with proceeds going to Children in Crisis.

He created an art car using a Range Rover Autobiography, calling it a "roving sculpture".

The Royal Agricultural University commissioned McDonald to create an artwork for permanent display in 2018.

McDonald has created large scale reverse perspex mounted portraits of Eric Clapton to benefit Clapton's Crossroads Antigua Charity. He has also created reverse perspex mounted portraits of Joan Collins and Sharron Davies.

McDonald painted the helmet used by British mountaineer Kenton Cool on his 16th climb of Mount Everest in May, 2022.

== Reception ==
GQ wrote a profile of McDonald calling him "The Artist to Watch".
