= What I Know Now =

What I Know Now: Simple Lessons Learned the Hard Way
- First edition
- Authors: Sarah Ferguson, Duchess of York
- Language: English
- Publisher: Simon and Schuster
- Publication date: 2003
- Media type: Print
- Pages: 180
- ISBN: 978-0-743-24612-5

What I Know Now: Simple Lessons Learned the Hard Way is a 2003 non-fiction book by Sarah Ferguson, Duchess of York, in which she reflects on the personal and public challenges that shaped her life. Drawing from her experiences as a member of the British royal family, a mother, and a woman rebuilding her identity after years of media scrutiny, Ferguson offers readers a collection of insights on resilience, forgiveness, and self-discovery.

== Production ==
Ferguson's What I Know Now: Simple Lessons Learned the Hard Way was published by Simon & Schuster in 2003, with its paperback edition released later on 25 September 2007. The book presents a reflective narrative in which the Duchess of York drew from her own life to share "hard-won lessons" on personal growth, self-forgiveness, and resilience. CBS News described it as a work grounded in Ferguson's candid exploration of her public and private struggles, covering themes such as balancing family and work, managing finances, and healing from past experiences. The first chapter, "Forgiving the Past", was featured as an excerpt by CBS News, offering readers a glimpse into her introspective tone and her efforts to reframe personal mistakes as sources of wisdom. Overall, the book was conceived as a motivational and self-help-styled memoir, combining autobiography with lessons designed to resonate beyond her life.

== Reception ==
Critics and readers alike viewed What I Know Now as a candid, emotionally open account of Ferguson's life after years in the media spotlight. The Midwest Book Review praised the book for being "teeming with generously accumulated accounts" of a woman learning to come to terms with her past and her public persona. The same review highlighted how Ferguson's storytelling balanced self-effacing humor with vulnerability, making her reflections relatable despite her royal background. CBS News also framed the book as an honest attempt by Ferguson to share wisdom from her personal hardships, especially in the wake of intense public scrutiny. While critics did not view it as a work of high literary style or depth, they acknowledged its sincerity and accessibility, noting its appeal to readers interested in personal reinvention and emotional healing.

== See also ==
- My Story, her 1996 autobiography
- Finding Sarah: A Duchess's Journey to Find Herself, her 2011 autobiography
