= Sarah's Trust =

United Kingdom-based charity

- Formation: 2020
- Founder: Sarah Ferguson
- Dissolved: 2026
- Type: Charity
- Purpose: Supporting vulnerable communities
- Location(s): Humanitas; 31 Bucklersbury; Hitchin, Hertfordshire SG5 1BG
- Region served: United Kingdom (primarily)
- Key people: Trustees: Sarah Ferguson; Ramzi Yousef Khamis; Deborah Hare
- Website: sarahstrust.com

Sarah's Trust was a United Kingdom-based charity launched in 2020 by Sarah Ferguson.

In February 2026, it was announced that the charity would close for the "foreseeable future".

== Activities ==
At the time of its launch, the charity provided aid for NHS, care home and hospice staff by delivering more than 150,000 items, including food, masks, scrubs, and toiletries. Organisations such as Under One Sky and NOAH Enterprise have helped the foundation by giving sleeping bags to homeless people in the UK. Essentials and supplies have also been sent to Ghana.

In March 2022, Ferguson travelled to Poland amid the Russian invasion of Ukraine to meet with Ukrainian refugees and help Sarah's Trust in organising goods donated by UK citizens. In July 2022, the charity secured money to fund £14,000-worth of computers for Ukrainian refugees in Poland. She also helped with setting up the 'Play in a Box' tent in Upper Silesia to host refugee children for reading, playing, and baking.

In 2023, Sarah's Trust supported St Matthew's Church, Burnley. The charity provided community support via gift bags, funding food projects, and sponsoring a pantomime outing for local families.

In February 2026, Sarah's Trust announced its closure "for the foreseeable future," a decision the charity stated had been under discussion for several months. The announcement followed the release of U.S. Department of Justice documents related to Jeffrey Epstein, which included emails from 2009 showing contact between Sarah Ferguson and the convicted sex offender. Previous revelations about Ferguson's association with Epstein had led several charities to drop her as a patron in 2025.

== See also ==
- Children in Crisis
