= A Most Intriguing Lady =

2023 novel by Sarah Ferguson

- Author: Sarah Ferguson
- Language: English
- Genre: Romance novel
- Publisher: HarperCollins
- Publication place: United Kingdom
- Pages: 368
- ISBN: 978-0-00-851297-2

A Most Intriguing Lady (published in the UK as A Woman of Intrigue in 2024) is a 2023 romance novel by Sarah Ferguson former Duchess of York. The novel is a semi-fictional story about Ferguson's great-great-aunt, Lady Mary Montagu Douglas Scott.

== Synopsis ==
A Most Intriguing Lady follows Lady Mary Montagu Douglas Scott, the youngest daughter of the Duke of Buccleuch in Victorian Scotland, who is navigating the rigid social expectations of aristocratic society while asserting her own independence. Lady Mary is clever, resourceful, and curious, which leads her into a web of societal intrigue, family secrets, and romantic possibilities as she encounters friends, rivals, and potential suitors.

As the story progresses, Lady Mary becomes embroiled in uncovering hidden truths about her family and their connections to the broader aristocratic world. She navigates challenges including arranged marriages, financial pressures, and the strictures of gender roles, all while maintaining her sense of humor and moral compass. Ferguson's narrative emphasizes Lady Mary's intelligence and agency, showcasing how she uses wit and diplomacy to influence the people around her and shape her own destiny.

The novel culminates in resolutions both romantic and familial, as Lady Mary finds her place within society and comes to terms with her own desires and responsibilities. Themes of self-discovery, loyalty, and perseverance are central, reflecting Ferguson's interest in strong, independent female characters inspired by her own family history.

== Production ==
Ferguson published A Most Intriguing Lady (titled A Woman of Intrigue in the UK) as part of her ongoing work as a novelist and writer of historical fiction. The book was inspired by Ferguson's own aristocratic heritage and Victorian era history, particularly drawing from her ancestors in the Montagu Douglas Scott family. Ferguson described the writing process as immersive, aiming to capture the social customs, intrigue, and romance of 19th-century Scotland while providing a compelling heroine for modern readers. The novel was published by HarperCollins in the UK and Avon/HarperCollins in the US, with minor differences in title and edition to appeal to the respective markets.

== Reception ==
The reception of the novel was generally positive, with The Independent noting its combination of historical detail, engaging storytelling, and strong heroine. Good Morning America noted that Ferguson's personal experience and background added authenticity to the depiction of Victorian society.
