= My Story (Duchess of York book) =

1996 autobiography

- First edition
- Authors: Sarah, Duchess of York; Jeff Coplon
- Language: English
- Genre: Autobiography
- Publisher: Simon and Schuster
- Publication date: June 1996
- Media type: Print
- Pages: 306
- ISBN: 978-0-684-83581-5

My Story is the 1996 autobiography by Sarah, Duchess of York. It was written in the aftermath of Sarah's divorce from Prince Andrew, Duke of York.

It was published by Simon and Schuster in June 1996 for a reported advance of £800,000 to £1.5 million. The editor-in-chief of Simon and Schuster said that the book aimed to describe Sarah and her experiences "as they are rather than how they have been portrayed". Sarah was reportedly also offered another £1 million if she could help commit Diana, Princess of Wales to publishing a book.

The initial print run of My Story was 400,000. Sarah was interviewed on American television by Larry King, David Letterman, Oprah Winfrey, Rosie O'Donnell, and Diane Sawyer during her publicity tour for the book which was published in November 1996. Sarah told Sky News that she would not be interviewed by them unless they paid her £20,000. They refused, and after telling her that her attempt at blackmail would be a lead story, she subsequently relented. The Daily Mail challenged the factual accuracy of some of Sarah's statements in the book. My Story was serialised in Hello! magazine.

My Story competed against two other memoirs written by people close to Sarah that were released to coincide with her book. The Duchess of York: Uncensored was written by her faith healer Vasso Kortesis and David Leigh, and Fergie: Her Secret Life by her friend Allan Starkie.

Revelations in the book included Sarah's finding a 'worm like device' that she thought was a microphone planted by MI5 at her home. She wrote of her spending habits that "with Coutts behind me I played Santa all year long" as she accrued an overdraft of £3.3 million.

== Reception and aftermath ==
Reviewing My Story in The Times in November 1996, Sarah Bradford described the book as a "protected whinge portraying herself as a victim" and wrote that it "goes without saying that the writing is appalling ... she has nothing to say. It could be the worst book of the decade". A tongue-in-cheek review by satirist Joe Queenan in The New York Times stated that " ...to understand fully Ms. Ferguson's acumen, it is necessary to read My Story from cover to cover. Like Sam Walton and Donald Trump before her, Ms. Ferguson has written a seminal primer on the psyche of the entrepreneur, bristling with homespun wisdom sure to be passed down from generation to generation" and that "... most important, anyone wishing to emulate Ms. Ferguson should bear these words in mind: "When you have touched the flames of hell, a branding iron is only a mild inconvenience"."

An anecdote included in My Story involved Sarah claiming that Diana, Princess of Wales, had given her plantar warts by sharing shoes. According to Tina Brown this led to Diana refusing to speak to Sarah ever again, although Diana's butler Paul Burrell claimed that the main reason behind her fury was Sarah's inclusion of repeated references to Diana and her sons in the book.

== See also ==
- Finding Sarah: A Duchess's Journey to Find Herself, her 2011 autobiography
- List of British royal memoirs
