= Callan Pinckney =

American fitness entrepreneur (1939–2012)

- Born: September 26, 1939; Savannah, Georgia, U.S.
- Died: March 1, 2012 (aged 72); Savannah, Georgia, U.S.
- Known for: Creator of Callanetics

Callan Pinckney (born Barbara Biffinger Pfeiffer Pinckney; September 26, 1939 – March 1, 2012) was an American fitness professional who created and popularized as well as excelled in the Callanetics exercises.

Pinckney's nine books became international best-sellers and the video series that followed sold over 6 million copies. Pinckney's first video release, Callanetics: 10 Years Younger In 10 Hours, outsold every other fitness video in the US. Within three years it had become the all-time individual best-selling fitness video.

== Early life ==
Pinckney was born on September 26, 1939, in Savannah, Georgia. She was born with spinal curvatures, one hip higher than the other and severely turned-in feet. As a result, Pinckney was forced to wear leg braces for seven years. In an effort to correct her alignment, she spent the next decade studying classical ballet.

== Eleven years around the world ==
After two years of college, Pinckney went to Bremerhaven, Germany. For nearly a year, she traveled across Europe, sleeping in a Volkswagen. She took odd jobs whenever she needed. When Pinckney reached London, she worked manual labor jobs such as shoveling coal and snow for eight hours for little more than $3 a day.

After her time in London, Pinckney went to Cape Town, South Africa, where she obtained a job with an advertising agency. After a year there, she traveled to Zimbabwe, Kenya, and Zaire. She worked part of the time tracking animal migrations in the wild. To supplement her income, she took on menial labor jobs. Due to Pinckney's inadequate diet, she suffered from severe amoebic dysentery and lost 78 pounds. Her heavy rucksack also put a great strain on her back, shoulders and knees.

Pinckney soon decided to travel to Asia. She went first to Mumbai, India and then to Sri Lanka. During this time in Sri Lanka, Pinckney realized that her muscles had lost all their tone and she had no flexibility or extension. The movements she had been able to do as a teenager were now almost impossible. After reaching Japan, Pinckney obtained a job recording British voice-over tapes for advertising. She also wrote about her experiences on the road for a Japanese magazine, modeled miniskirts, and managed a bar with Western waitresses.

Eleven years after leaving London, Pinckney returned. Regarding her medical condition, one British doctor advised her to have surgery on her knees; another said her back would never recover. She was in constant pain and in an attempt to alleviate her suffering she turned first to ballet and then to yoga and toning classes. She trained in the Martha Graham dance technique at The Place (London). She also attended the Rehabilitation Exercise Studio set up by German dancer Lotte Berk. Berk had seriously injured her back while dancing and had devised a program to ease her discomfort whilst maintaining her strength and flexibility.

== Returning home ==
In 1972 Pinckney returned to Savannah, Georgia. Soon after her arrival, she left for New York City to assume a teaching job at an exercise studio. However, after disagreements with the owner regarding the exercise regimen, Pinckney quit the studio.

During this period, Pinckney worked to find new exercise methods. She found ways to protect her back and increase the effectiveness of different exercises. She learned how to strengthen and alleviate the pain from her knees. She also discovered that she could quickly tone her muscles using these new movements. She started teaching private students in her apartment.

After consulting with a numerologist, Pinckney decided to change her first name to "Callan" to help provide her direction for her future.

== Birth of Callanetics ==
As her exercise classes grew in popularity, Pinckney needed to give them a name. One of her students would always refer to them as "Callan-etics", a name-blend of "Callan" and "athletics". Pinckney decided to use that name.

In 1984, after seven years of teaching Callanetics, Pinckney published her first book, Callanetics: 10 Years Younger In 10 Hours. Within two years the book had sold close to a million copies in the United States alone. She was profiled in Time and People magazines and appeared on many chat shows.

In 1986, Pinckney released the first Callanetics video. Based on word-of-mouth, the video became a best-seller. In 1987, Pinckney trained one of her advanced students to become the first certified Callanetics instructor.

Toward the end of 1987 Pinckney was invited to represent the United States in the World Elephant Polo Competition in Nepal. She put together the Callanetics Ladies Team which included amongst others orca trainer Judy Peterson. The team finished in sixth place. Pinckney said that riding the elephant was therapeutic for her back.

In 1988, Pinckney published Callanetics For Your Back. Pinckney believed that many people were suffering back problems due to the radical fitness movement in the United States during that period. The book became another bestseller. To tie in with the book release, Pinckney released a new video Super Callanetics. This video showed more intense versions of the familiar Callanetics exercises. The video also became a bestseller.

== Return from London ==
In 1989, Pinckney released the Beginning Callanetics video. This was a shorter version of the original one-hour program with more basic explanations for people who had never experienced the Callanetics method. Pinckney created the shorter program and included some of the exercises she had written about in her "Callanetics For Your Back" book. Later that year, Callan published her third book, Callanetics Countdown for people who did not have enough time for a full hour of exercise. It became another bestseller.

In March 1989 Pinckney traveled to London to promote a paperback edition of the original Callanetics book in Harrods department store.

== Callanetics franchise ==
In November 1990, Pinckney decided to set up a franchise for Callanetics studios and introduce a proper teacher training program. She opened the Callanetics Franchise Corporation with headquarters in Denver, Colorado. From here teachers were trained and licences were given for studios across the country. Pinckney set up a new Manhattan studio in the attic of Carnegie Hall to be run by her student Ruth Jeffries. Over the next 12 months, nine more studios opened in the United States.

In May 1991 the Callanetics Franchise Corporation received its first requests from people wanting to set up studios in England and Scotland. By September several more teachers from the UK were trained in Denver with the intention of setting up studios across England. Fourteen studios were opened in Belgium and Switzerland and the Callanetics Franchise Corporation were receiving requests from all over the world. To cope with the demand for qualified Callentics teachers, Pinckney started training master teachers who would be authorized to train teachers in their own countries.

Pinckney's next book, Super Callanetics, gave her the chance to give a more in depth explanation of the advanced exercises seen in the earlier video of the same name. In 1992, she published the Quick Callanetics video and book series. In them Pinckney demonstrated three short programs each aimed at toning a different area of the body in only 20 minutes. In 1993 she published "AM/PM Callanetics", a program consisting of two daily routines to shape up the entire body. The book and accompanying video contained a 25-minute morning routine to energize participants for the day and a 25-minute evening routine to relax them for the night.

== Retirement ==
In 1995, Pinckney published her final book Callanetics: Fit Forever. The book addressed many middle-aged concerns from dieting and nutrition to menopause and stress. She included an eating plan and aerobic exercise that would increase the heart rate but without sharp, jarring movements, leaping up and down to loud music or pressure on the back or joints. It was meant to be challenging, without discomfort or stress.

Pinckney continued to advise instructors on her program for several years before entering retirement in 1998.

== Death ==
Pinckney died in 2012, aged 72, in Savannah.

== Official Callanetics books ==
Year	Title	Publisher	Release Date	Copyright Information	ISBN
1984	Callanetics: 10 Years Younger In 10 Hours	William Morrow	September 14, 1984	Callan Productions Corp.	000000
1987	Callanetics: 10 Years Younger In 10 Hours	Warner Audio Books - Cassette	May 12, 1987	Callan Productions Corp.	000000
1988	Callanetics For Your Back	William Morrow	September 2, 1988	Callan Productions Corp.	000000
1989	Callanetics For Your Back	Simon & Schuster Audio Book - Cassette	March 3, 1989	Callan Productions Corp.	000000
1990	Callanetics Countdown	Century	March 15, 1990	Callan Productions Corp.	000000
1991	Super Callanetics	Ebury	March 21, 1991	Callan Productions Corp.	000000
1992	Quick Callanetics: Stomach	Vermilion	February 4, 1992	Callan Productions Corp.	000000
1993	Quick Callanetics: Stomach	Random House Audio Books - Cassette	February 26, 1993	Callan Productions Corp.	000000
1992	Quick Callanetics: Legs	Vermilion	February 4, 1992	Callan Productions Corp.	000000
1993	Quick Callanetics: Legs	Random House Audio Books - Cassette	February 26, 1993	Callan Productions Corp.	000000
1992	Quick Callanetics: Hips and Behind	Vermilion	February 4, 1992	Callan Productions Corp.	000000
1993	Quick Callanetics: Hips and Behind	Random House Audio Books - Cassette	February 26, 1993	Callan Productions Corp.	000000
1993	AM/PM Callanetics	Random House	April 8, 1993	Callan Productions Corp.	000000
1993	Complete Callanetics	Ebury Press	April 1, 1993	Callan Productions Corp.	000000
1995	Callanetics: Fit Forever	G.P. Putnam and Sons	January 18, 1996	Callan Productions Corp.	000000
1996	New Callanetics. Die neue Methode	Berlin : Ullstein, 1996	1996	Callan Pinckney, Benita Cantieni	9783550088018
2013	Callanetics: 10 Years Younger In 10 Hours	Random House UK (Re-issue)	August 26, 2013	Callan Productions Corp.	9780099590620
2013	AM/PM Callanetics	Random House UK (Re-issue)	September 30, 2013	Callan Productions Corp.	9780099590590
2013	Quick Callanetics - Legs	Random House UK (Re-issue)	November 29, 2013	Callan Productions Corp.	9780091954840
2013	Quick Callanetics - Hips & Behind	Random House UK (Re-issue)	November 29, 2013	Callan Productions Corp.	9780091954833
2013	Quick Callanetics - Stomach	Random House UK (Re-issue)	November 29, 2013	Callan Productions Corp.	9780091954826
2013	Callanetics: Fit Forever	Random House UK (Re-issue)	November 29, 2013	Callan Productions Corp.	9780091954819
2013	Callanetics Countdown	Random House UK (Re-issue)	November 29, 2013	Callan Productions Corp.	9780099590637
2014	Super Callanetics	Random House UK (Re-issue)	September 22, 2014	Callan Productions Corp.	9781784750510
2014	Complete Callanetics	Random House UK (Re-issue)	December 31, 2014	Callan Productions Corp.	9780091960421

== Official Callanetics videos ==
Year	Title	Format	Studio	Release Date	Copyright Information	Catalog Number
1986	Callanetics: 10 Years Younger In 10 Hours	VHS/Betamax	MCA	November 4, 1986	Callan Productions Corp.	80429 / BTA80429
1993	Callanetics: 10 Years Younger In 10 Hours	LaserDisc	MCA Universal	January 27, 1993	Callan Productions Corp.	40429
1988	Super Callanetics	VHS/Betamax	MCA Universal	October 6, 1988	Callan Productions Corp.	80809 / BTA80809
1989	Beginning Callanetics	VHS/Betamax	MCA Universal	October 5, 1989	Callan Productions Corp.	80892 / BTA80892
1991	Quick Callanetics: Stomach	VHS	MCA Universal	October 3, 1991	Callan Productions Corp.	81062
1991	Quick Callanetics: Legs	VHS	MCA Universal	October 3, 1991	Callan Productions Corp.	81061
1991	Quick Callanetics: Hips and Behind	VHS	MCA Universal	October 3, 1991	Callan Productions Corp.	81063
1992	AM/PM Callanetics	VHS	MCA Universal	October 22, 1992	Callan Productions Corp.	81258
1994	The Secrets Of Callanetics	VHS	MCA Universal	December, 1994	Callan Productions Corp.	81868

== Official Callanetics DVDs ==
Year	Title	Format	Studio	Release Date	Copyright Information	Catalog Number
1986	Callanetics: 10 Years Younger In 10 Hours	DVD	Callan Productions Corp	March 15, 2013	Callan Productions Corp.	CAL01 / 0091037137319
1988	Super Callanetics	DVD	Callan Productions Corp	March 15, 2013	Callan Productions Corp.	CAL02 / 0091037137326
1989	Beginning Callanetics	DVD	Callan Productions Corp	March 15, 2013	Callan Productions Corp.	CAL03 / 0091037137333
1991	Quick Callanetics	DVD	Callan Productions Corp	March 15, 2013	Callan Productions Corp.	CAL04 / 0091037553546
1992	AM/PM Callanetics	DVD	Callan Productions Corp	March 15, 2013	Callan Productions Corp.	CAL05 / 0091037137357
1994	The Secrets Of Callanetics	DVD	Callan Productions Corp	March 15, 2013	Callan Productions Corp.	CAL06 / 0091037137364
2016	Pure Callanetics	DVD	Callan Productions Corp	August 16, 2016	Callan Productions Corp.	CAL08A / 602573090152
2016	Callanetics Extreme	DVD	Callan Productions Corp	August 16, 2016	Callan Productions Corp.	CAL09A / 602573090169
2016	Callanetics Countdown	DVD	BayView Entertainment	December 27, 2016	Callan Productions Corp.	BAY2224
2017	Callanetics Wake Up/Wind Down	DVD	Bayview Entertainment	March 7, 2017	Callan Productions Corp.	BAY2234
2017	Callanetics Express	DVD	Bayview Entertainment	March 28, 2017	Callan Productions Corp.	BAY2233
2017	Callanetics Basics	DVD	Bayview Entertainment	March 28, 2017	Callan Productions Corp.	BAY2232
