= Children in Crisis =

British non-profit organisation

- Formation: 1993
- Founder: Sarah, Duchess of York
- Dissolved: 2018
- Type: Charity
- Purpose: improving the lives of children and women from underprivileged backgrounds
- Location(s): Children in Crisis 33 Creechurch Lane London, England EC3A 5EB
- Region served: Afghanistan, Burundi, Democratic Republic of the Congo, Liberia and Sierra Leone
- Key people: Trustees: see below
- Website: childrenincrisis.org

Children in Crisis was a non-profit organization aimed at improving the lives of children and women from underprivileged backgrounds in third-world countries. It was headquartered in London, England. On the 25th anniversary of Children in Crisis's foundation in 2018, it was merged with Street Child, an organisation run by Tom Dannatt in Bangladesh, Afghanistan and Sierra Leone.

== Patronage ==
The organization was founded by Sarah, Duchess of York, who served as president. Her elder daughter, Princess Beatrice of York, served as Ambassador of Children in Crisis starting in 2007. Alongside Beatrice, her younger daughter, Princess Eugenie of York, attended the fundraising annual dinner in March 2011.

The vice-presidents were: Paul Szkiler, Grahame Harding, Olivier de Givenchy and Mark Olbrich.

The Board of Trustees comprised:

- Alasdair Haynes (chair).
- Alexandra Buxton.
- Ron Friend.
- Deborah Helsby.
- Frances Prenn.
- Julia Streets.
- Anthony Wallersteiner.
- James Henderson.

== Overview ==
In 2005, it worked with other partners in Afghanistan to provide education for children who had been unable to attend school. It also helped HIV/AIDS education in Sierra Leone and with schools in East Timor.

== See also ==
- Sarah's Trust
