= Callanetics =

Exercise programme by Callan Pinckney

The Callanetics exercise programme was created by Callan Pinckney in the early 1980s. It is a system of exercise involving frequent repetition of small muscular movements and squeezes, designed to improve muscle tone. The programme was developed by Pinckney from classical ballet exercises, to help ease a back problem that she was born with.

The theory of callanetics is that the surface muscles of the body are supported by deeper muscles, but popular exercise programmes often exercise only the surface muscles. According to callanetics, deeper muscles are best exercised using small but precise movements. Exercising the deeper muscles also leads to improved posture, which may result in the appearance of weight loss even if very little weight was lost.

Pinckney also recommends exercising with clothing that highlights (however of course not to flatter) the body's natural shape, and exercising in bright light, to show up the body's imperfections to the exerciser.

The video version of the exercise routine was released by MCA Home Video in November 1986 at a retail price of $29.95 and was a big hit, selling 1 million copies in the United States by January 1990, one of MCA's biggest sellers at the time.

== Official Callanetics books by Callan Pinckney ==
Year	Title	Publisher	Release Date	Copyright Information	ISBN
1984	Callanetics: 10 Years Younger In 10 Hours	William Morrow	September 14, 1984	Callan Productions Corp.	000000
1987	Callanetics: 10 Years Younger In 10 Hours	Warner Audio Books - Cassette	May 12, 1987	Callan Productions Corp.	000000
1988	Callanetics For Your Back	William Morrow	September 2, 1988	Callan Productions Corp.	000000
1989	Callanetics For Your Back	Simon & Schuster Audio Book - Cassette	March 3, 1989	Callan Productions Corp.	000000
1990	Callanetics Countdown	Century	March 15, 1990	Callan Productions Corp.	000000
1991	Super Callanetics	Ebury	March 21, 1991	Callan Productions Corp.	000000
1992	Quick Callanetics: Stomach	Vermilion	February 4, 1992	Callan Productions Corp.	000000
1993	Quick Callanetics: Stomach	Random House Audio Books - Cassette	February 26, 1993	Callan Productions Corp.	000000
1992	Quick Callanetics: Legs	Vermilion	February 4, 1992	Callan Productions Corp.	000000
1993	Quick Callanetics: Legs	Random House Audio Books - Cassette	February 26, 1993	Callan Productions Corp.	000000
1992	Quick Callanetics: Hips and Behind	Vermilion	February 4, 1992	Callan Productions Corp.	9780091752842
1993	Quick Callanetics: Hips and Behind	Random House Audio Books - Cassette	February 26, 1993	Callan Productions Corp.	000000
1993	AM/PM Callanetics	Random House	April 8, 1993	Callan Productions Corp.	9780099229919
1993	Complete Callanetics	Ebury Press	April 1, 1993	Callan Productions Corp.	9780091780760
1995	Callanetics: Fit Forever	G.P. Putnam and Sons	January 18, 1996	Callan Productions Corp.	9780399141218
2013	Callanetics: 10 Years Younger In 10 Hours	Random House UK (Re-issue)	August 26, 2013	Callan Productions Corp.	9780099590620
2013	AM/PM Callanetics	Random House UK (Re-issue)	September 30, 2013	Callan Productions Corp.	9780099590590
2013	Quick Callanetics - Legs	Random House UK (Re-issue)	November 29, 2013	Callan Productions Corp.	9780091954840
2013	Quick Callanetics - Hips & Behind	Random House UK (Re-issue)	November 29, 2013	Callan Productions Corp.	9780091954833
2013	Quick Callanetics - Stomach	Random House UK (Re-issue)	November 29, 2013	Callan Productions Corp.	9780091954826
2013	Callanetics: Fit Forever	Random House UK (Re-issue)	November 29, 2013	Callan Productions Corp.	9780091954819
2013	Callanetics Countdown	Random House UK (Re-issue)	November 29, 2013	Callan Productions Corp.	9780099590637
2014	Super Callanetics	Random House UK (Re-issue)	September 22, 2014	Callan Productions Corp.	9781784750510
2014	Complete Callanetics	Random House UK (Re-issue)	December 31, 2014	Callan Productions Corp.	9780091960421

== Official Callanetics videos by Callan Pinckney ==
Year	Title	Format	Studio	Release Date	Copyright Information	Catalog Number
1986	Callanetics: 10 Years Younger In 10 Hours	VHS/Betamax	MCA	November 4, 1986	Callan Productions Corp.	80429 / BTA80429
1993	Callanetics: 10 Years Younger In 10 Hours	LaserDisc	MCA Universal	January 27, 1993	Callan Productions Corp.	40429
1988	Super Callanetics	VHS/Betamax	MCA Universal	October 6, 1988	Callan Productions Corp.	80809 / BTA80809
1989	Beginning Callanetics	VHS/Betamax	MCA Universal	October 5, 1989	Callan Productions Corp.	80892 / BTA80892
1991	Quick Callanetics: Stomach	VHS	MCA Universal	October 3, 1991	Callan Productions Corp.	81062
1991	Quick Callanetics: Legs	VHS	MCA Universal	October 3, 1991	Callan Productions Corp.	81061
1991	Quick Callanetics: Hips and Behind	VHS	MCA Universal	October 3, 1991	Callan Productions Corp.	81063
1992	AM/PM Callanetics	VHS	MCA Universal	October 22, 1992	Callan Productions Corp.	81258
1994	The Secrets Of Callanetics	VHS	MCA Universal	December, 1994	Callan Productions Corp.	81868

== Official Callanetics DVDs ==
Year	Title	Format	Studio	Release Date	Copyright Information	Catalog Number
1986	Callanetics: 10 Years Younger In 10 Hours	DVD	Callan Productions Corp	March 15, 2013	Callan Productions Corp.	CAL01 / 0091037137319
1988	Super Callanetics	DVD	Callan Productions Corp	March 15, 2013	Callan Productions Corp.	CAL02 / 0091037137326
1989	Beginning Callanetics	DVD	Callan Productions Corp	March 15, 2013	Callan Productions Corp.	CAL03 / 0091037137333
1991	Quick Callanetics	DVD	Callan Productions Corp	March 15, 2013	Callan Productions Corp.	CAL04 / 0091037553546
1992	AM/PM Callanetics	DVD	Callan Productions Corp	March 15, 2013	Callan Productions Corp.	CAL05 / 0091037137357
1994	The Secrets Of Callanetics	DVD	Callan Productions Corp	March 15, 2013	Callan Productions Corp.	CAL06 / 0091037137364
2016	Pure Callanetics	DVD	Callan Productions Corp	August 16, 2016	Callan Productions Corp.	CAL08A / 602573090152
2016	Callanetics Extreme	DVD	Callan Productions Corp	August 16, 2016	Callan Productions Corp.	CAL09A / 602573090169
2016	Callanetics Countdown	DVD	BayView Entertainment	December 27, 2016	Callan Productions Corp.	BAY2224
2017	Callanetics Wake Up/Wind Down	DVD	Bayview Entertainment	March 7, 2017	Callan Productions Corp.	BAY2234
2017	Callanetics Express	DVD	Bayview Entertainment	March 28, 2017	Callan Productions Corp.	BAY2233
2017	Callanetics Basics	DVD	Bayview Entertainment	March 28, 2017	Callan Productions Corp.	BAY2232
