= Finding Sarah: A Duchess's Journey to Find Herself =

2011 autobiography by Sarah Ferguson

- First edition
- Authors: Sarah, Duchess of York
- Language: English
- Genre: Autobiography
- Publisher: Simon and Schuster
- Publication date: 28 June 2011
- Media type: Print
- Pages: 315
- ISBN: 978-1-439-18954-2

Finding Sarah: A Duchess's Journey to Find Herself is the 2011 autobiography by Sarah, Duchess of York. It was written in the aftermath of Sarah's numerous financial and public troubles, including the cash-for-access scandal. The Associated Press described it as a "very personal memoir" that delves into Sarah's personal and financial struggles, and incorporates emails and intimate diary excerpts. The memoir coincided with a documentary series, Finding Sarah: From Royalty to the Real World, which aired on the Oprah Winfrey Network.

== See also ==
- My Story, her 1996 autobiography
- List of British royal memoirs
