= Prevent Breast Cancer =

Prevention charity

Prevent Breast Cancer is a UK charity funding research solely aimed at preventing breast cancer. The Manchester-based charity aims to promote early diagnosis of breast cancer, improve cancer screenings, and change the habits and lifestyles of high-risk patients. Based at The Nightingale Centre & Prevent Breast Cancer Research Centre in Wythenshawe, Manchester, where the NHS co-ordinates the breast-screening programme for the Greater Manchester area.

== History ==
Prevent Breast Cancer, previously named Genesis Breast Cancer Prevention, was officially launched in 1996. The charity raises funds for research into the breast cancer gene BRCA2. From 2000 until 2007 the charity raised £2 million towards the building of Europe's first breast cancer prevention centre, which opened at Wythenshawe Hospital in 2007. Genesis changed their name to Prevent Breast Cancer in 2016 to better represent their overall mission.

The charity was founded by Lester Barr, who is the current chairman of Prevent Breast Cancer and a Consultant Breast Surgeon. He has been practicing surgery for more than 30 years and currently runs a One Stop Breast Clinic at Spire Manchester Hospital. Barr is also Associate Hospital Dean at Wythenshawe Hospital.

=== The Nightingale Centre ===
The charity's flagship medical centre, The Nightingale Centre, was opened in August 2007 at Wythenshawe Hospital, Manchester. The £14m centre was funded by Greater Manchester Strategic Health Authority (GMSHA) and Prevent Breast Cancer donations. The centre was the first of its kind in Europe, and was designed to provide diagnostic and prevention services to patients across the North West. More than 50,000 people from the Greater Manchester area are screened at the centre every year. Before it was built, it was housed at Withington Hospital.

== Research ==
=== Predicting Risk of Cancer at Screening (PROCAS) SNP study ===
The PROCAS1 recruited over 58,000 women and was the largest recruiting study in the UK. It was led by Prevent Breast Cancer Researcher, Professor of Genetics, Gareth Evans.

The study evaluated the feasibility of introducing personalised breast cancer risk estimation into the NHS Breast Screening programme through the collection of information on breast cancer risk factors.

Prevent Breast Cancer funded the collection of saliva samples and DNA extraction from 10,000 women on the study and testing genetic fragments (SNPs) for key information. The information for each woman was collated in order to provide a risk score.

PROCAS 2 launched in October 2017 and will involve a further 18,600 women, whose risk of developing the disease within the next ten years will again be calculated.

Evans and his team developed a gene test in October 2017 to provide more accurate risk information to families specifically with the BRCA gene mutation. The BRCA1 and BRCA2 gene mutations are known to increase the risk of breast cancer in patients between 45 and 90 per cent. The test analysed 18 genetic variants Single Nucleotide Polymorphisms – SNPs in blood or saliva across 1,400 women who carried the BRCA high-risk gene. Researchers believe the test could reduce the number of pre-emptive mastectomies in the UK from 50 to 36 per cent.^{[7]} The plan is for the genetic test to enter clinical practice in the UK in six months.

==== The Angelina Jolie Effect ====
Referrals for the gene test more than doubled in 2013 after Angelina Jolie shared her own experiences with the media. She decided to undergo a double mastectomy after learning she had an up to 87 per cent chance of developing breast cancer. The increase in referrals was dubbed the "Angelina Jolie effect" by the media.

=== The 2-Day Diet ===
The 2-Day Diet was developed by Professor Tony Howell and Dr Michelle Harvie, both of whom have spent years researching and developing the optimum diet for weight loss and the links to breast cancer risk.

The 2-Day Diet has been proven to reduce fat, which reduces insulin levels and controls other hormones, such as oestrogen. High levels of oestrogen in the body are known to cause cancer.

Prevent Breast Cancer funded a study by Harvie which involved 1,000 women, split into two groups. The study was published in the peer-reviewed Breast Cancer Research journal. To date, the centre's 2-Day Diet book and cookbook have sold more than 340,000 copies in the UK and has been published in over 16 countries. The book was ranked number 64 in the bestselling printed books of 2013 and the cookbook was ranked number 4 on the Sunday Times Bestselling Manual List for 2013. Author proceeds from the book sales enabled Prevent Breast Cancer to fund the BRRIDE-2 study which analyses the effect of an intermittent diet (The 2-Day Diet) versus a daily energy restriction diet on the body and the link to fat stores in and around the liver as fats here are found to contribute to insulin resistance and therefore breast cancer risk.

== Partnerships ==
=== Manchester City Football Club ===
Prevent Breast Cancer was Manchester City Football Club's chosen charity in 2000. The partnership was celebrated by a launch of 2,000 balloons at the City of Manchester Stadium. Each balloon signified one of the 2,000 women in the Greater Manchester area diagnosed with breast cancer each year. Prevent Breast Cancer were able to use their £50,000 funding to establish a temporary prevention centre at Withington Hospital.

=== Stagecoach Manchester ===
To celebrate the launch of their new partnership in October 2015, Prevent Breast Cancer decorated a Stagecoach Manchester bus with a 26-metre long, four-layered tutu which was listed in the Guinness Book of Records as the "World's Largest Tutu". A staff vote saw Stagecoach Manchester select Prevent Breast Cancer as their chosen charity for two years and the company raised £21,000.

== Fundraising events ==
On 2 June 2018 Stars in their Eyes, the musical talent show in which amateur lookalikes and soundalikes impersonate their favourite singer, returned for one night only, in aid of Prevent Breast Cancer.

The live revival special was held at The Royal Northern College of Music in Manchester, and enabled over 630 audience members to watch past contestants perform, including the very first winner Maxine Barrie, who won awards impersonating Dame Shirley Bassey in a TV Documentary called The Real Shirley Bassey.

The show was recreated as accurately as possible, and all branding usage rights were granted by ITV and Endemol Shine. Most of the original production crew worked on the show, which was hosted by original host Matthew Kelly.

Over £32,000 was raised for the charity.

== See also ==
- Cancer in the United Kingdom
