= Street Child (charity) =

- Formation: 2008
- Type: International NGO
- Registration no.: 1128536
- Purpose: Education access, Disaster Relief, Advocacy, Localisation, Safeguarding and protection services
- Headquarters: London, UK
- Region served: Worldwide
- CEO: Tom Dannatt
- Website: https://www.street-child.org/

Street Child is a British-founded charity with a global vision: to see all children safe, in school and learning. Established in Sierra Leone in 2008 (under the name Street Child of Sierra Leone, or SCoSL), the charity has since expanded its operations into over 20 of the world’s poorest and most disaster-hit countries, across sub-Saharan Africa, Asia, the Middle East and Europe.

The primary focus of the charity is ensuring the provision of education in low-resource environments and emergencies, through training teachers, building schools, and helping out-of-school children into education. Street Child aim to integrate their interventions in these contexts, combining education support with protection and psychological support services; emergency aid; and assistance for families to create sustainable livelihoods.

Street Child also has an expanding network of local partners, and advocates internationally for the benefits of responses driven by local actors.

== History ==
Street Child was founded by Tom and Lucinda Dannatt in 2008, with the objective of addressing the unmet educational needs of vulnerable children in Sierra Leone. The inspiration for Street Child arose from a trip Tom made to Sierra Leone, where he observed the challenging conditions faced by street-connected children.

The charity’s first project focused on supporting 100 street-connected children in Makeni, Sierra Leone, back into education and encouraging family reunification.

Family Business Scheme

Street Child launched the ‘Family Business Scheme’ in 2010, which supports families through a combination of training, cash grants, and mentoring, accompanied by incentivised savings schemes. Through the scheme, low-income families, identified by social workers, are supported by business officers to develop a plan for a sustained income.

The charity aimed to encourage school retention by strengthening family livelihoods, signalling their commitment to long-term, sustainable investment in education. Each business grant, on average, supports two children to go to school.

In 2019, the ‘Family Business for Education’ programme won a prestigious WISE Award at the World Innovation Summit for Education in Doha, Qatar.

Sierra Leone Marathon

In June 2012, Street Child organised the inaugural Sierra Leone Marathon, an event named the world’s ‘craziest and most worthwhile’ marathon by Runner’s World.

The marathon has become an annual fixture for the charity (excepting the years 2020-21 due to Ebola), unique for its combination of sporting challenges and the opportunity to experience the charity’s in-country programmes first-hand.

In 2017, the Sierra Leone Marathon won ‘Best International Event’ in the Running Awards.

Street Child of Liberia

In 2013, Street Child began expanding their education work beyond the borders of Sierra Leone, establishing ‘Street Child of Liberia’. The initial project supported 200 children in West Point slum, Monrovia.

Humanitarian relief work

In response to the Ebola crisis (2014-15) and Nepal earthquakes of 2015, Street Child began to expand the remit of their operations to encompass disaster relief and the protection of children in emergencies.

The charity’s primary response to the Ebola crisis in Sierra Leone was identifying and supporting ‘Ebola orphans’ with social care and humanitarian aid. Street Child also launched an ‘Ebola prevention’ campaign which worked at a local level through ‘Ebola educators’ who raised awareness about virus containment within communities.

Following the devastating earthquakes of April and May 2015, Street Child launched operations in Nepal, in collaboration with UNICEF. The charity assisted local partners to re-establish educational provision in the aftermath of the crisis, constructing temporary learning centres and WASH facilities and training teachers in psycho-social support and Disaster Risk Reduction.

Expansion of Street Child Programmes to Nigeria, Bangladesh and Uganda

In 2016, following the success of its locally rooted humanitarian responses to the Ebola crisis and the Nepal earthquakes, Street Child expanded its operations in response to the ongoing Boko Haram insurgency in North East Nigeria. As of 2024, Street Child Nigeria has grown into one of the charity’s largest operations, having supported the education of over 125,000 Nigerian children.

In 2017, Street Child further solidified its commitment to providing education and protection to children affected by emergencies. This included collaborations with local partner NGOs and the launch of projects aimed at addressing two of the world’s most pressing refugee crises; the Rohingya crisis in Bangladesh and the influx of South Sudanese refugees into Northern Uganda.

Charities join the Street Child family

In 2018, Children in Crisis joined the Street Child family, expanding the geographical reach of the charity into Afghanistan, Burundi and the Democratic Republic of Congo.

In 2019, Lessons for Life Foundation joined, inaugurating the charity’s partnership with Liberty Global.

Later that year, Street Child acquired a third charity, Build Africa, taking on their educational and WASH programmes in Uganda and Kenya.

The Africa Education Trust joined Street Child in 2020, strengthening the charity’s reach in South Sudan, Somalia and Somaliland.

Bread and Water for Africa (BWA) became part of Street Child in 2022, bringing their expertise and programming in 11 African countries. Tom Dannatt, CEO and founder of Street Child, said ‘Whilst we are different in scale, BWA is a charity with very similar values and ethos to Street Child; putting communities and local NGOs at the heart of everything they do.’

COVID-19 Pandemic

Street Child was one of the first international charities to formally launch a COVID-19 Appeal, drawing on the experience the charity had accumulated in the Ebola Crisis years. The charity’s response measures included WASH provision; psychosocial support; distribution of food, hygiene, and sanitary supplies; circulation of learning packs and educational radio broadcasts.

By the end of September 2021, Street Child had reached 5.6 million people with information and/or services to help them cope with the pandemic.

Afghanistan

It became harder for Street Child to operate in Afghanistan when the Taliban regained power in 2021. But the charity scaled operations and took on new initiatives to respond to the crisis, making Afghanistan the charity’s largest learning and protection programme from 2021 to 2023.

Ukraine Appeal

Street Child launched an emergency response within 24 hours of the Russian invasion of Ukraine, supporting over 30 local organisations. This was the charity’s first emergency response in Europe and, with the support of the Women’s Consortium of Ukraine, the charity was the first international organisation to enter the de-occupied territory of Kyiv oblast. The disaster response programmes ranged from emergency relief to the provision of psychosocial and protection support for children. Street Child's programming in Ukraine remains active, providing vital support to children amid the ongoing conflict.

Times Christmas Appeal

In November 2023, Street Child was chosen as the international charity for The Times and The Sunday Times Christmas Appeal and was featured in a series of articles over the two-month campaign period. The campaign received an additional boost from UK government aid match funding, significantly amplifying the impact of donations. By the end of the appeal, Street Child had raised over £1.5 million, setting a new fundraising record for international charities taking part in the appeal.

Education Cannot Wait (ECW) governance

In 2024, Street Child was appointed to represent international civil society actors in the governance of Education Cannot Wait (ECW), the United Nations’ global fund for education in emergencies. ECW unites public and private donors, governments, UN agencies, civil society organizations, locally-led groups, and other stakeholders to address the educational needs of children affected by crises worldwide.

== Awards and recognition ==
2019 Street Child won the WISE award for Innovation in Education for their ‘Family Business for Education’ programme, which combines mentoring and school placement support with a livelihood assistance package.

2020 Street Child’s Covid-19 response is commended by the United Nations Girls Education Initiative [UNGEI] as an exemplar of how to adapt programming in a crisis to ensure gender equality.

2021 The UK Foreign, Commonwealth & Development Office (FCDO) awarded Street Child’s work with most-marginalized Musahar girls in Nepal an A+ two years consecutively for the program’s results, and 5/5 for value for money.

2022 Street Child won the 2022 David M. Rubenstein Prize by the Library of Congress for their ‘outstanding and measurable contribution to increasing literacy levels in multiple parts of the world’.

2022 Street Child’s Afghanistan team won the Solve MIT & Jacobs Foundation Challenge for their work using tablets to improve the quality of teaching in rural Afghanistan.
