= Finding Sarah: From Royalty to the Real World =

- Genre: Documentary
- Directed by: Elise Duran
- Starring: Sarah Ferguson
- Country of origin: United States
- Original language: English
- No. of seasons: 1
- No. of episodes: 6

Production
- Executive producers: Elise Duran; Fenton Bailey; Randy Barbato; Sarah Ferguson; Tom Campbell
- Running time: 40 minutes
- Production company: World of Wonder Productions

Original release
- Network: OWN: Oprah Winfrey Network
- Release: June 12 – July 24, 2011

Finding Sarah: From Royalty to the Real World is an American documentary television series on the Oprah Winfrey Network that debuted on June 12, 2011.

== Premise ==
The series follows the daily life of Sarah, Duchess of York, as she rebuilds her life after her divorce from Prince Andrew, and following numerous financial and public troubles. Throughout the episodes she seeks advice from experts in different fields including Phil McGraw, Suze Orman, and Martha Beck to find out how she can improve her life. Highlights of the show included Sarah's journey through Canada's Arctic region during which she challenged her physical and mental stamina.

== Episodes ==
No.	Title	Original release date	U.S. viewers (millions)
1	"My Fall from Grace"	June 12, 2011	0.616
2	"Braving the Big City"	June 19, 2011	0.481
Sarah attempts to restart her writing career in New York City but is haunted by her past.
3	"Soul Searching in the Desert"	June 26, 2011	0.383
Sarah goes through spiritual healing while in the deserts of Arizona.
4	"Life or Death Challenge..."	July 10, 2011	0.255
Sarah endures a 26 mile trip through the below-freezing weather in Canada.
5	"The Hardest Journey of All"	July 17, 2011	0.310
Sarah continues through Canada's Arctic.
6	"When One Journey Ends...A New Life Begins"	July 24, 2011	0.225
In the series finale, Sarah goes home to England and is shocked by what is waiting for her when she arrives.
