= Wedding dress of Meghan Markle =

2018 dress by Clare Waight Keller

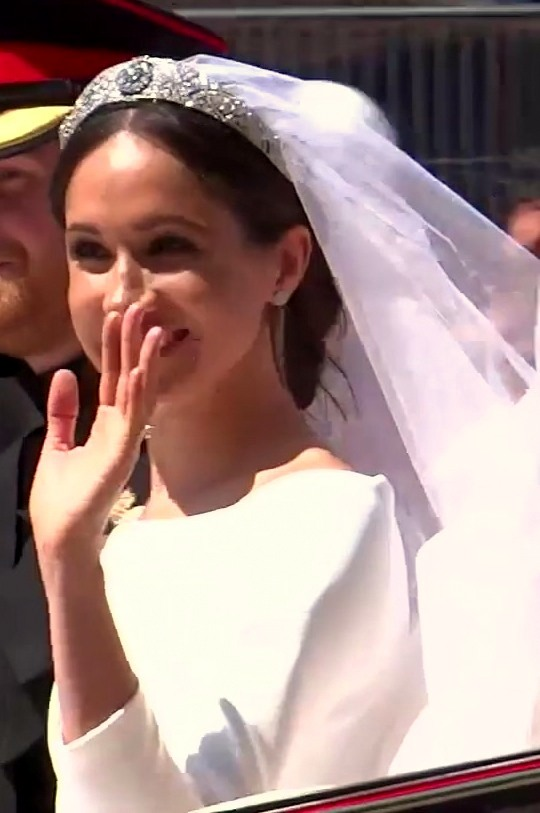
- Markle wearing the dress on her wedding day
- Designer: Clare Waight Keller
- Year: 2018
- Material: Silk

The wedding dress worn by Meghan Markle at her wedding to Prince Harry on 19 May 2018 was designed by the British fashion designer Clare Waight Keller, artistic director of the fashion house Givenchy. The bride's veil was embroidered with flowers representing the countries of the Commonwealth; the California poppy, in honour of Markle's home state of California; and wintersweet, a flower that grows at Kensington Palace.

== Pre-wedding speculation ==
The engagement of Meghan Markle and Prince Harry was announced on 27 November 2017, but speculation about the bride's dress had already begun earlier. Some commentators suggested that Markle would not wear a white wedding dress as she had been married previously. In December 2017, Israeli designer Inbal Dror was asked to submit designs for a wedding dress. It was rumoured that Erdem and Ralph & Russo were also contenders. By January 2018, British designer Stewart Parvin was the bookmakers' favourite. Betting was suspended after Alexander McQueen attracted a large number of wagers. Markle had commented on wedding dress styles in 2016 while filming her role in Suits, saying that she preferred simple styles. Markle, a vocal admirer of the style of Carolyn Bessette-Kennedy, described Bessette-Kennedy's wedding gown as "everything goals".

== Design ==
=== Designer ===
Markle chose designer Waight Keller because she "wanted to highlight the success of a leading British talent who has now served as the creative head of three globally influential fashion houses — Pringle of Scotland, Chloé, and now Givenchy."

She chose Keller to create her wedding dress due to the designer's "elegant aesthetic" and "relaxed demeanour." Waight Keller has been Givenchy's creative director since 2017. The dress was made in Paris by "a small team of ateliers". There was only five months to have the dress and the veil manufactured, and Waight Keller and Markle met for eight fittings.

Markle and Waight Keller worked closely together to design the dress, which shows a "timeless minimal elegance", according to a Kensington Palace announcement. The two contacted each other through discreet texts and phone calls, before and after nondisclosure agreements were signed, with Waight Keller unable to tell anyone that she had been selected to design the dress.

Waight Keller stated that the dress sought to "convey modernity through sleek lines and sharp cuts", while paying homage to the history of the Givenchy house.

=== Dress ===
The design of the simple white dress and the name of its maker were revealed only when the bride got out of the car and entered St George's Chapel at Windsor Castle for the wedding service. The dress was made of silk with three-quarter-length sleeves, an open boat neckline and a train with built-in triple silk organza underskirt. Waight Keller helped develop a double bonded silk cady for the construction of the dress, which featured only six seams. The dress was without lace or any other embellishments.

=== Veil ===
The dress is augmented by a long 5 metre (16-ft) veil, made from silk tulle and hand-embroidered with a variety of flowers on its hem, and symbolic sprays of wheat. It was 3 metres wide. The veil took longer to create than the dress itself, and the embroiderers spent 500 hours on completing it, washing their hands every 30 minutes to make sure that the veil would remain immaculate until the wedding day. A piece of the blue dress from Markle's first date with Prince Harry was stitched into the bridal veil. Markle also chose two favourite flowers – wintersweet (Chimonanthus praecox), which grows outside Nottingham Cottage at Kensington Palace, where she and Harry lived, and the California poppy (Eschscholzia californica), from where she was born – along with individual flowers representing the 53 countries of the Commonwealth, reflecting the couple's interest in the work of the Commonwealth. The countries and flowers are:

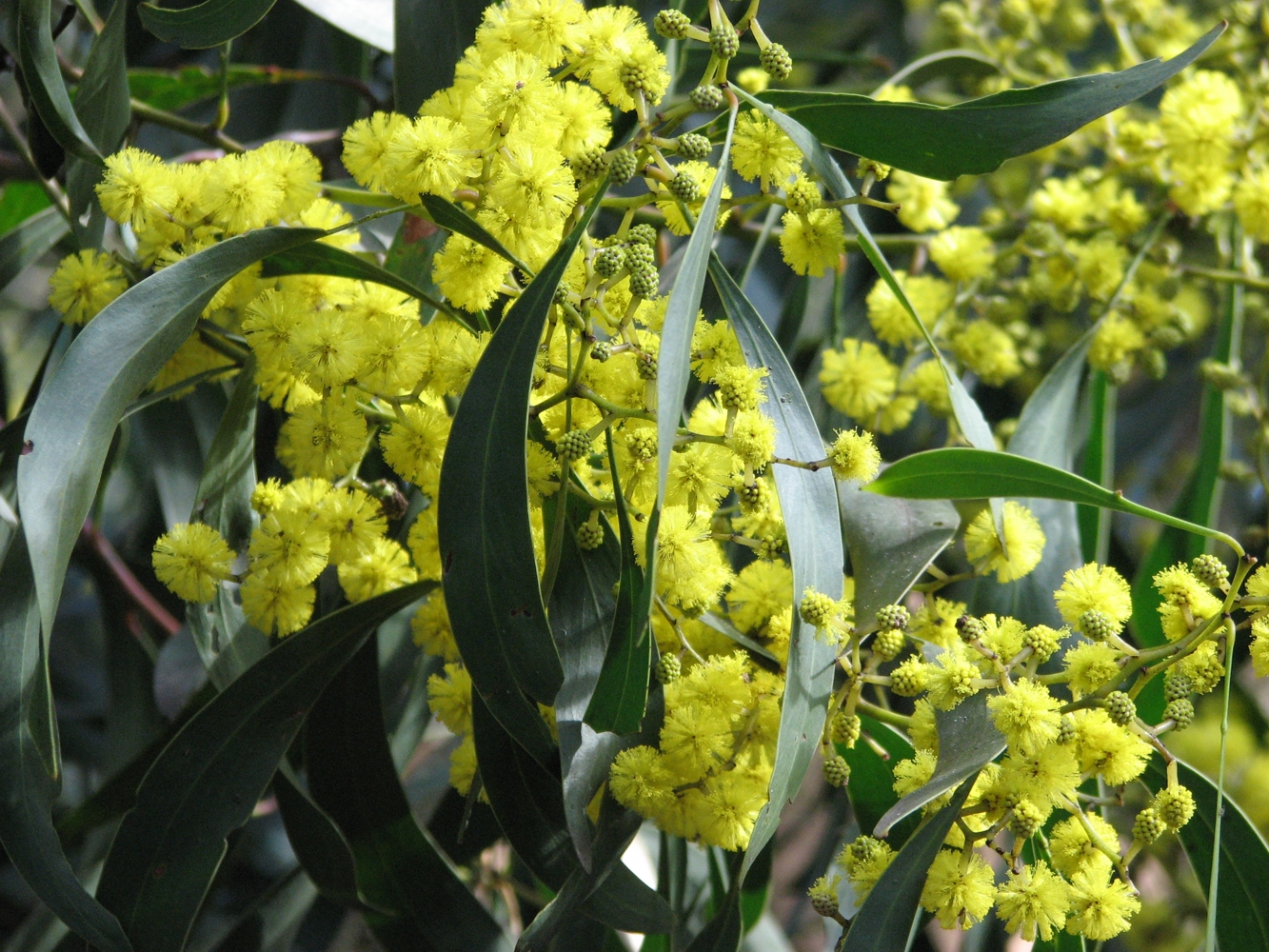
Acacia pycnantha (Australia)

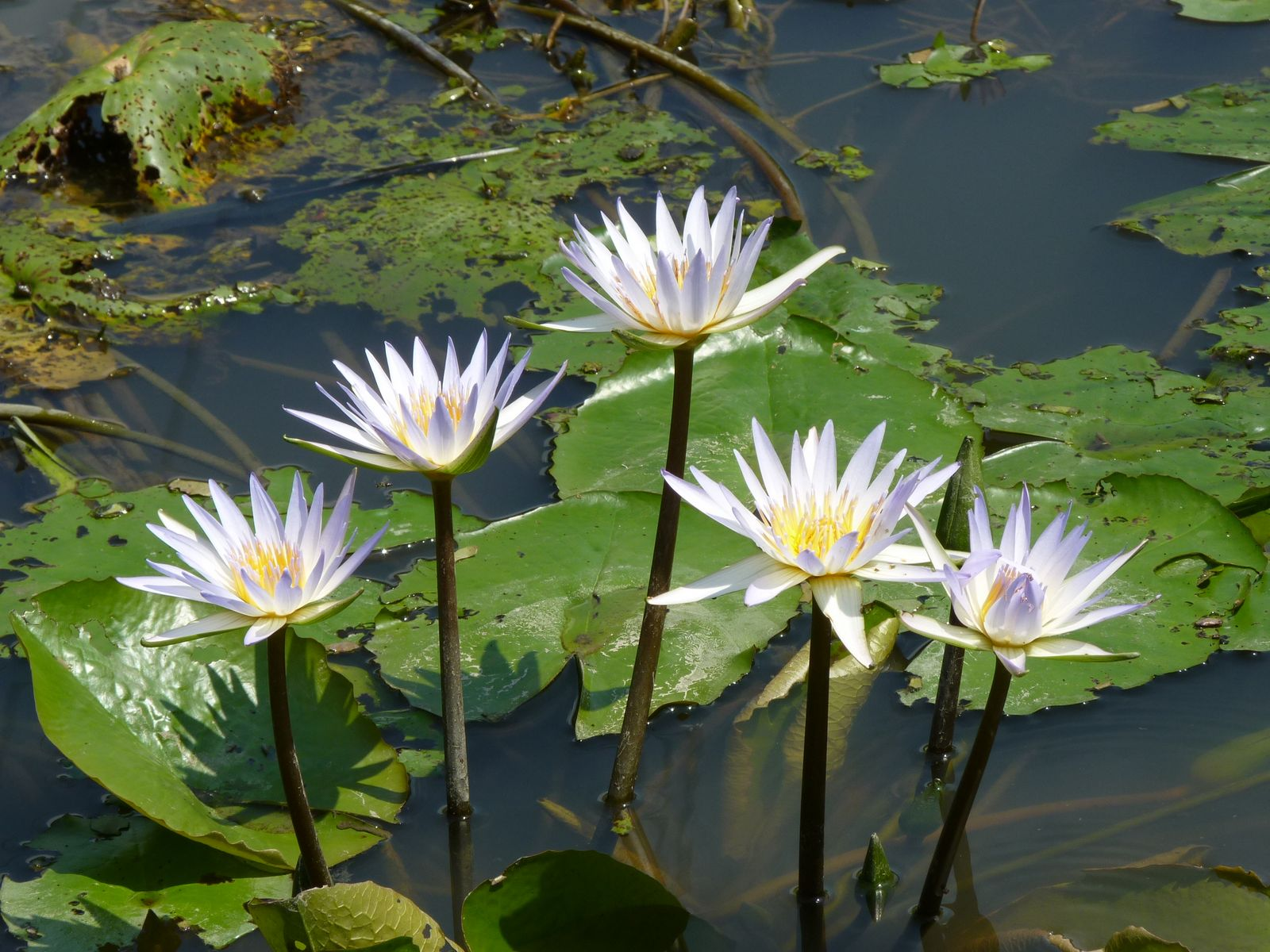
Nymphaea nouchali (Bangladesh)

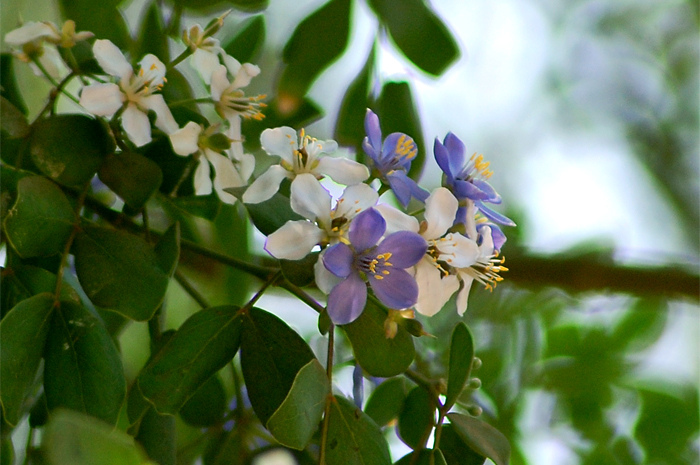
Guaiacum officinale (Jamaica)

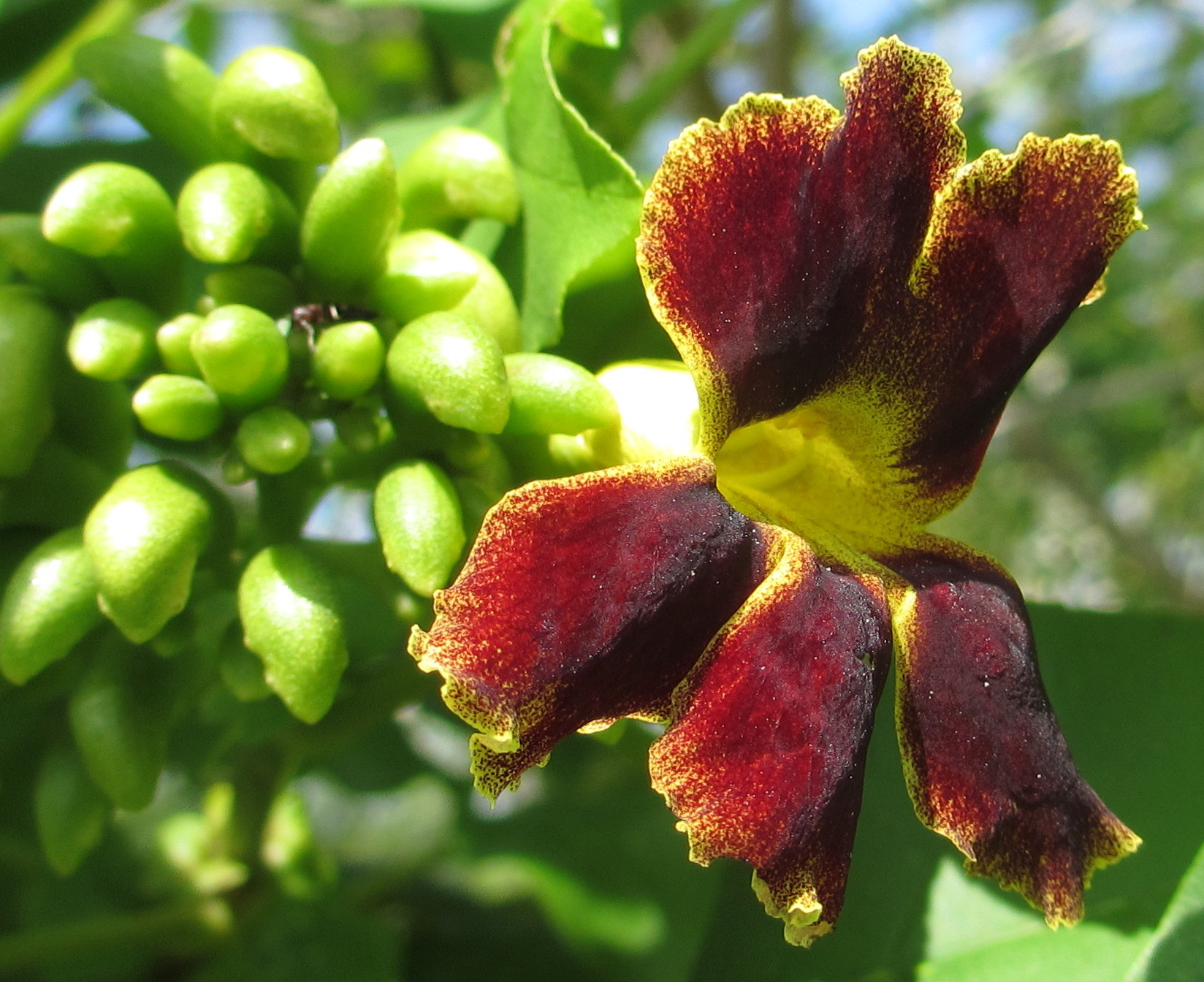
Markhamia zanzibarica (Mozambique)

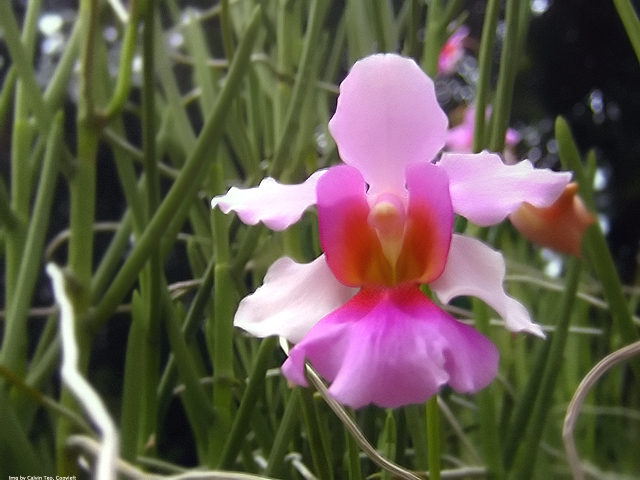
Vanda 'Miss Joaquim' (Singapore)

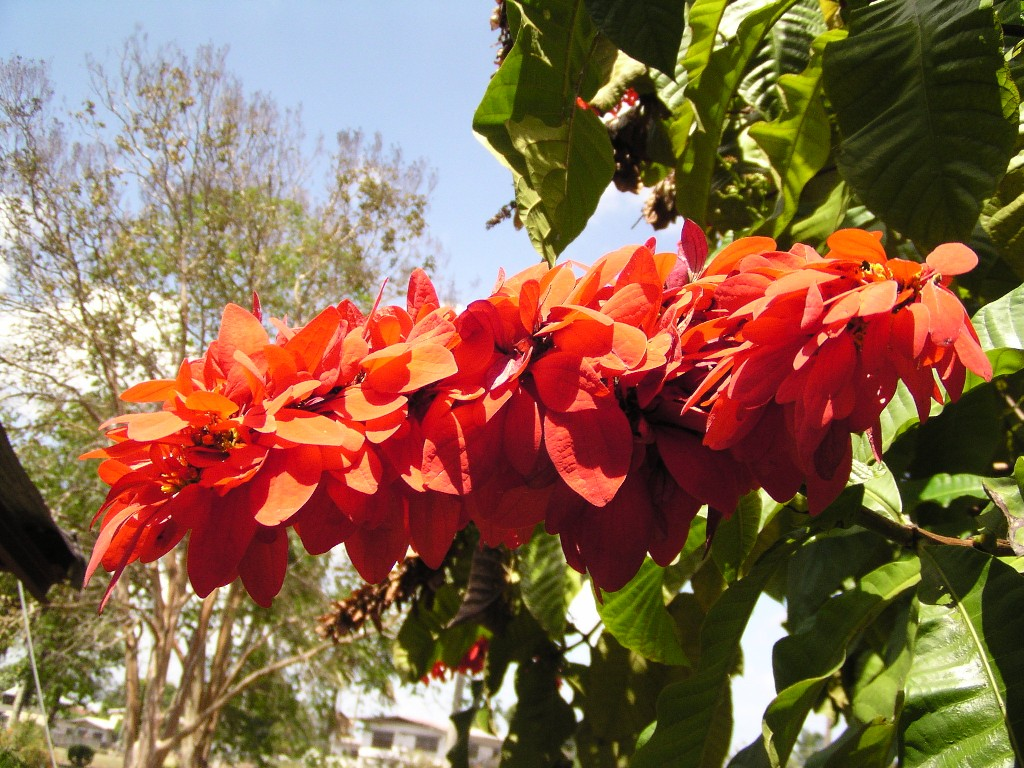
Warszewiczia coccinea (Trinidad and Tobago)

- Antigua and Barbuda – agave (Agave karatto)
- Australia – golden wattles (Acacia pycnantha)
- Bahamas – yellow elder (Tecoma stans)
- Bangladesh – sada shapla or white water lily (white form of Nymphaea nouchali)
- Barbados – the pride of Barbados (Caesalpinia pulcherrima)
- Belize – the black orchid (Prosthechea cochleata)
- Botswana – ear of Sorghum and cat's claw (Uncaria tomentosa)
- Brunei Darussalam – simpor (Dillenia suffruticosa)
- Cameroon – red stinkwood (Prunus africana)
- Canada – bunchberry (Cornus canadensis)
- Cyprus – Cyclamen cyprium
- Dominica – carib wood (Poitea carinalis)
- Eswatini – fire heath (Erica cerinthoides)
- Fiji – tagimaucia (Medinilla waterhousei)
- Gambia – white variety orchid
- Ghana – caladium (Caladium)
- Grenada – bougainvillea (Nyctaginaceae)
- Guyana – Queen Victoria water lily (Victoria amazonica)
- India – Indian lotus (Nelumbo nucifera)
- Jamaica – lignum vitae (Guaiacum officinale)
- Kenya – the tropical orchid
- Kiribati – Bidens kiribatiensis
- Lesotho – spiral aloe (Aloe polyphylla)
- Malawi – lotus (Nymphaea lotus)
- Malaysia – bunga raya or tropical hibiscus (Hibiscus rosa-sinensis)
- Malta – Maltese centaury (Cheirolophus crassifolius)
- Mauritius – Trochetia boutoniana
- Mozambique – maroon bell bean (Markhamia zanzibarica)
- Namibia – welwitschia (Welwitschia mirabilis)
- Nauru – Calophyllum
- New Zealand – kowhai (Sophora microphylla)
- Nigeria – yellow trumpet (Costus spectabilis)
- Pakistan – jasmine (Jasminum officinale)
- Papua New Guinea – Sepik blue orchid (Dendrobium lasianthera)
- Rwanda – torch lily (Kniphofia uvaria)
- Saint Lucia – the rose and the marguerite
- Samoa – teuila (Alpinia purpurata)
- Seychelles – tropicbird orchid (Angraecum eburneum)
- Sierra Leone – scadoxus (Scadoxus cinnabarinus)
- Singapore – Vanda 'Miss Joaquim'
- Solomon Islands – hibiscus (Hibiscus)
- South Africa – protea (Protea cynaroides)
- Sri Lanka – blue water lily (pale blue form of Nymphaea nouchali)
- St Kitts and Nevis – poinciana (Delonix regia)
- St Vincent & the Grenadines – Soufriere tree (Spachea perforata)
- Tonga – heilala (Garcinia sessilis)
- Trinidad & Tobago – chaconia (Warszewiczia coccinea)
- Tuvalu – plumeria (Plumeria rubra)
- Uganda – desert rose (Adenium obesum)
- United Kingdom
  - England – rose (Rosa)
  - Northern Ireland – flax (Linum usitatissimum)
  - Scotland – thistle (Cirsium vulgare)
  - Wales – daffodil (Narcissus)
- United Republic of Tanzania – African violet (Streptocarpus sect. Saintpaulia)
- Vanuatu – anthurium (Anthurium)
- Zambia – bougainvillea (Bougainvillea)

== Reception ==
Elizabeth Emanuel, co-designer of Lady Diana Spencer's wedding gown, thought that the gown made a "really solid fashion statement" and thought that Waight Keller "should be pleased because Meghan looked absolutely stunning and beautiful." Waight Keller stated that Prince Harry told her "Oh my God. Thank you. She is absolutely magnificent."

The media have noted similarities between Markle's dress and those worn by Angela Brown at her wedding to Prince Maximilian of Liechtenstein in 2000, and Mary Donaldson at her wedding to Frederik, Crown Prince of Denmark in 2004. It has also been compared to a Givenchy dress worn by Audrey Hepburn in the 1957 film Funny Face. Emilia Wickstead claimed that the dress was "identical" to one of her designs. Unfavorable comparisons of Markle's wedding dress in comparison to Catherine Middleton's wedding dress were proclaimed online and in the press, with Catherine's wedding dress being proclaimed as the "victor". Critics also noted that Markle's dress seemed an attempt to mimic the late fashionista Carolyn Bessette-Kennedy. Markle's wedding dress was compared to a formal dress Bessette-Kennedy once wore during her life, and her reception dress had similarities to Bessette-Kennedy's now-classic wedding gown at her wedding to John F. Kennedy Jr. in 1996, although Markle's reception dress was a 1990s-style halter dress.

Markle's wedding dress received mixed reviews from the public, some saying it was "beautiful" and "stunning" while others described it as "boring", "baggy", and "ill-fitting." Celebrity commentators, fashion editors, internet influencers, and Twitter commenters criticized the dress, calling it "boring", "ill-fitting", and "too big", criticizing the cut, the shape, and even the matte satin fabric, calling the finish "dull", criticizing a perceived lack of tailoring on the sleeves and waist, and others declaring the overall effect as "heavy". Fashion experts noted that the silk cady fabric would have been difficult to move in if the dress had been more form-fitting. Critics mocked the veil style and length, and created an Internet meme comparing it to a CVS receipt.

Robin Givhan of The Washington Post noted in her review of the gown that "It was not a Hollywood red carpet statement...it was not a Disney princess fantasy...the dress was a backdrop; it was in service to the woman." Desiree Cooper of the Detroit Free Press unfavorably compared the dress to a costume "straight from The Handmaid's Tale", but conceded, "She could have been wearing a paper bag (which she nearly was) and it wouldn't have mattered an iota. That girl was just plain stunning." Less than a week after the wedding, dresses based on Markle's were being sold.

The dress, veil and tiara were exhibited by the Royal Collection Trust at Windsor Castle from October 2018 until February 2019, and then at Holyrood Palace from June 2019 to October 2019.

== See also ==
- List of individual dresses
