= Wedding dress of Princess Beatrice of York =

Dress worn by Princess Beatrice of York at her wedding to Edoardo Mapelli Mozzi in 2020

- Designer: Norman Hartnell
- Year: 1961
- Type: Ivory gown
- Material: Paduasoy taffeta, Duchess satin and organza

The wedding dress of Princess Beatrice of York worn at her wedding to Edoardo Mapelli Mozzi on 17 July 2020 was designed by the British fashion designer Sir Norman Hartnell, who had originally created the gown for Queen Elizabeth II, the bride's grandmother, in the 1960s. The original dress was altered by the Queen's dressmaker, Angela Kelly, and British fashion designer Stewart Parvin, who remodelled and fitted the dress for Princess Beatrice.

== Creation and design ==
The dress was designed and made by Norman Hartnell for Queen Elizabeth II in the early 1960s. Hartnell was well known for his collaborations with the Royal Family, in particular Queen Elizabeth the Queen Mother and Queen Elizabeth II. The Queen wore the dress, which originally featured a more voluminous hem but no sleeves, at events such as the premiere of Lawrence of Arabia in 1962 and the 1967 State Opening of Parliament.

The dress is made from ivory peau de soie taffeta and is trimmed with ivory duchess satin. The gown also features diamanté adornments and a checkered, geometric bodice.

== Wedding dress ==
The Queen loaned the princess the dress for her wedding. The Queen's dressmaker, Angela Kelly, and the fashion designer and frequent royal collaborator, Stewart Parvin, worked together on the gown, altering it to fit Princess Beatrice and adding organza sleeves.

Princess Beatrice wore the Queen Mary Fringe Tiara, which both her grandmother, the Queen, and her aunt, the Princess Royal, wore at their weddings in 1947 and 1973 respectively. Princess Beatrice also carried a traditional royal bridal bouquet, with sprigs of myrtle.

The dress along with a silk replica of her bouquet was exhibited by the Royal Collection Trust at Windsor Castle from 24 September until 22 November 2020.

== See also ==
- List of individual dresses
