= Spachea perforata =

Soufrière tree

Scientific classification
- Kingdom: Plantae
- Clade: Tracheophytes
- Clade: Angiosperms
- Clade: Eudicots
- Clade: Rosids
- Order: Malpighiales
- Family: Malpighiaceae
- Genus: Spachea
- Species: S. perforata

Binomial name
- Spachea perforata Juss.

Species of flowering plant

Spachea perforata is a species of flowering plants in the order Malpighiales. It is the national flower of Saint Vincent and the Grenadines and is commonly known as the Soufrière tree because it can be found on the slopes of La Soufrière volcano on the island of St. Vincent.

== Description ==
Spachea perforata branches in an irregular pattern. It has simple lance-shaped leaves that measure roughly 2–4 in (5.1–10.2 cm) long and 1 in (2.5 cm) wide. It has many small pink flowers on each stem, arranged in pendant clusters around 2–3 in (5.1–7.6 cm) long.

While most species of Malpighiales have all hermaphroditic flowers, Spachea perforata does not, like other plants in the genus Spachea. The species appears to have the physical capabilities to reproduce asexually, but no specimen has ever been seen bearing fruit. However, the plant does prolifically produce new growth from cuttings, allowing new young trees to be grown which are generally healthy.

== Taxonomy ==
=== History ===
Spachea perforata was first collected in 1804 by Alexander Anderson, curator of the Saint Vincent and the Grenadines Botanic Gardens, on the slopes of La Soufrière. One of the specimens that he collected is still present in the botanical gardens, with several other younger trees being introduced as well. The species was added to the new genus Spachea in 1840 by Antoine Laurent de Jussieu with an original description, but lacking citation of the specimen that was described. In 1843, a longer description was published that included a specimen citation, and that description is what most subsequent analysis of the taxonomy of S. perforata depended on. A distinct lack of specimens and material continued to make analysis of the species difficult, but it was treated as valid in two separate monographs of the family Malpighiaceae.

=== Synonymy ===
In St. Vincent and the Grenadines it is claimed that the Soufrière Tree is endemic to the island of Saint Vincent; however, general collection on the island has never found a Soufrière Tree in the two centuries since its original finding by Anderson in 1804. In fact, the only known extant specimens come from the trees of the Botanic Gardens of Saint Vincent. As such, it was proposed as early as 1947 that the few known specimens of S. perforata are actually the species S. elegans, which has similar characteristics.
