= Angela Kelly =

British fashion designer and personal assistant to Elizabeth II

Angela Kelly CVO
- Born: Mary Angela Kelly; 4 November 1957 (age 68); Walton, Liverpool, England
- Occupations: Fashion designer, dressmaker, milliner
- Title: Personal Assistant, Adviser and Curator to Queen Elizabeth II (1993–2022)
- Spouses: Frank Wylie (divorced); ? Wonsack (divorced); Jim Kelly (divorced)
- Children: 3

Mary Angela Kelly, CVO (born 4 November 1957) is a British fashion designer, dressmaker, and milliner, who served as personal assistant and senior dresser to Queen Elizabeth II from 1993 until the monarch's death in 2022. Her official title was Personal Assistant, Adviser and Curator to Her Majesty The Queen (Jewellery, Insignias and Wardrobe).

== Early life ==
Kelly was born in Walton, Liverpool, as the daughter of a dockworker and a nurse. She was one of six children.

== Career ==
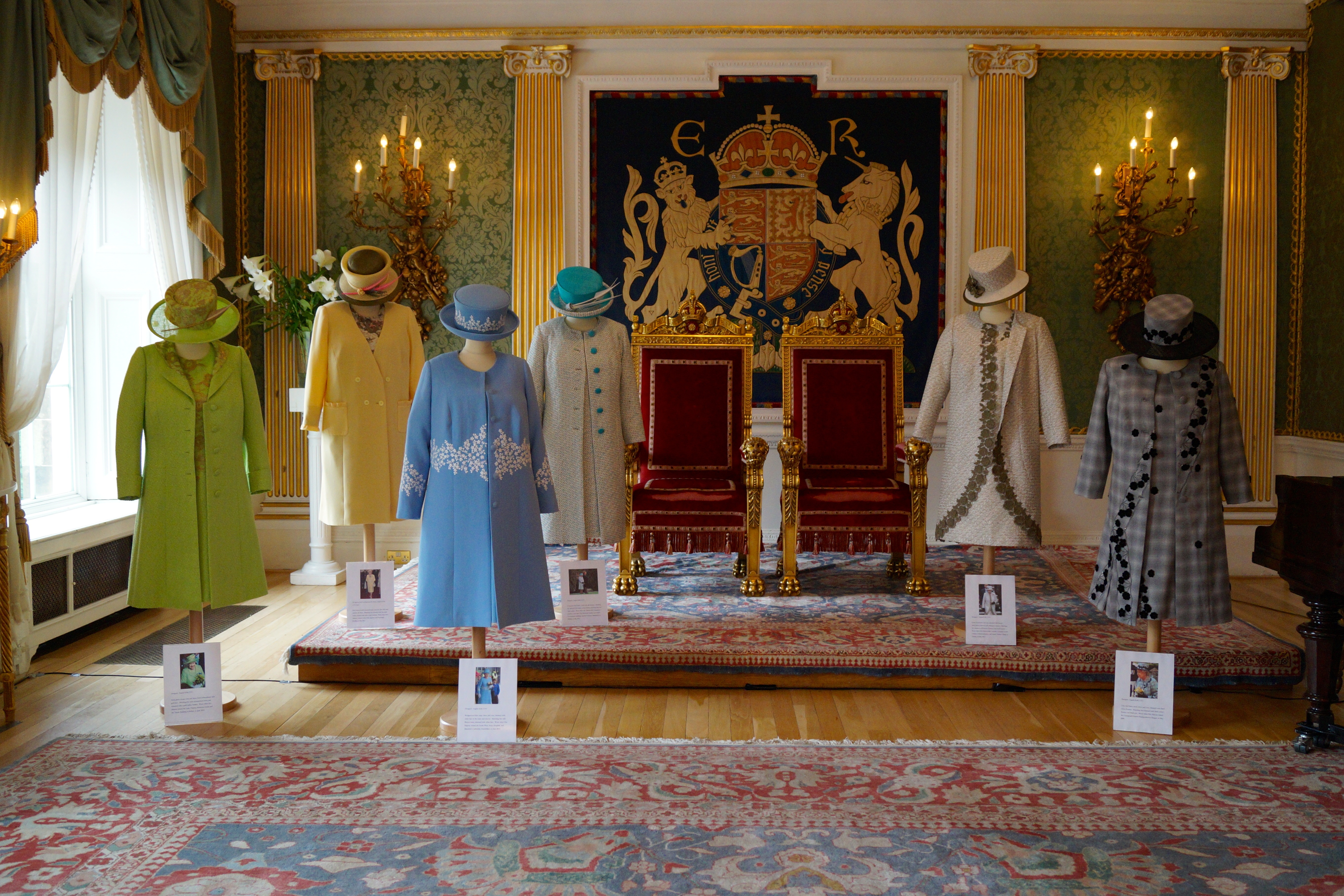
A display of six of Queen Elizabeth II's outfits, five of which were designed by Kelly, at Hillsborough Castle in County Down, Northern Ireland.

Kelly began working for the Queen after gaining employment as the Queen's Dresser following an interview at Windsor Castle in 1994. She was responsible for the Queen's clothes, jewellery and insignia, researching the venues for royal visits as well as the significance of different colours, in order to create appropriate outfits for the monarch. In 2019, Kelly announced that the Queen would only wear faux-furs.

Notable creations by Kelly include:

- The replica of the royal christening gown. The original, which had been commissioned by Queen Victoria for the christening of her first child, Victoria, Princess Royal, was retired in 2004 by Elizabeth II for conservation purposes. Kelly's replica has been worn by royal babies for their christenings since 2008.
- The Queen's outfit for the wedding of Prince William, Duke of Cambridge, and Catherine Middleton; a primrose-yellow double crepe wool coat and matching wool dress, with hand-sewn beading at the neck in the shape of sunrays.
- Princess Beatrice and Princess Eugenie's outfits for the wedding of Zara Phillips.
- Together with British fashion designer Stewart Parvin, Kelly altered, remodeled and fitted the dress that Princess Beatrice of York wore at her wedding to Edoardo Mapelli Mozzi on 17 July 2020. The original dress was designed by the British fashion designer Norman Hartnell, who had created it for Queen Elizabeth II, the bride's grandmother, in the 1960s.

Prince Harry alleged that Kelly was obstructive regarding a tiara promised by the Queen to his fiancée, Meghan Markle, for a rehearsal with her hairdresser prior to their wedding in 2018. Harry wrote in his memoir Spare that Kelly refused as "the tiara would require an orderly and a police escort to leave the palace" and that "She fixed me with a look that made me shiver. I could read in her face a clear warning. 'This isn't over.'" Kelly did not respond to Harry's recollections in his memoir.

With other members of the royal household, she attended the state funeral of Queen Elizabeth II on 19 September 2022.

== Other work ==
Kelly founded a fashion label, Kelly & Pordum, with Alison Pordum, who was also employed as the Queen's in-house dressmaker until 2008. Kelly is also the author of Dressing the Queen: The Jubilee Wardrobe and The Other Side of the Coin: The Queen, the Dresser and the Wardrobe.

== Personal life ==
Kelly has three children with her first husband Frank Wylie. Her third marriage was to Irish Guardsman Jim Kelly.

== Honours ==
- Royal Victorian Order:
  - 17 June 2006: Member (MVO)
  - 13 September 2012: Lieutenant (LVO)
  - 25 March 2023: Commander (CVO)

== Bibliography ==
- Kelly, Angela (2012). Dressing the Queen: The Jubilee Wardrobe. ISBN 978-1-905686-26-1.
- Kelly, Angela (2019). The Other Side of the Coin: The Queen, the Dresser and the Wardrobe. HarperCollins Publishers. ISBN 978-0008368364.
