= Spachea correae =

Conservation status
- Near Threatened (IUCN 3.1)

Scientific classification
- Kingdom: Plantae
- Clade: Tracheophytes
- Clade: Angiosperms
- Clade: Eudicots
- Clade: Rosids
- Order: Malpighiales
- Family: Malpighiaceae
- Genus: Spachea
- Species: S. correae

Binomial name
- Spachea correae Cuatrec. & Croat

Species of flowering plant

Spachea correae is a species of plant in the Malpighiaceae family. It is native to Costa Rica, Nicaragua and Panama. It is threatened by habitat loss.
