= Narciso Rodriguez =

American fashion designer (born 1961)

Narciso Rodríguez
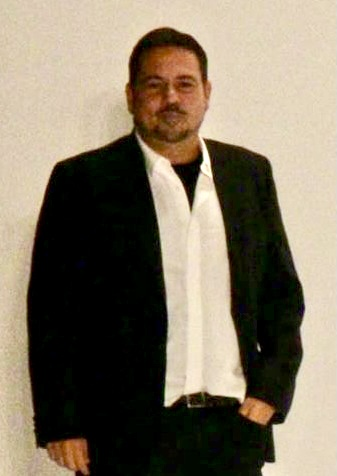
- Rodriguez in 2011
- Born: Narciso Jesus Rodriguez III; January 27, 1961 (age 65); Newark, New Jersey, U.S.
- Education: The New School (Parsons division)
- Label: Narciso Rodríguez
- Awards: CFDA Womenswear Designer of the Year (2002, 2003)

Narciso Jesus Rodriguez III (Latin American Spanish: [naɾˈsiso roˈðɾiɣes]; born January 27, 1961) is an American fashion designer known for minimalist, body-conscious silhouettes. He gained widespread attention in 1996 when he designed the wedding dress of Carolyn Bessette for her marriage to John F. Kennedy Jr. Rodriguez launched his own label in 1997 and won the Council of Fashion Designers of America (CFDA) Womenswear Designer of the Year award in both 2002 and 2003. He also designed the dress Michelle Obama wore on election night in November 2008, when Barack Obama first appeared as president-elect.

== Early life ==
Rodriguez was born in Newark, New Jersey, the eldest child and only son of Cuban parents, Narciso Rodríguez Sanchez II, a longshoreman, and Rawedia María Rodríguez. His paternal grandfather was born on the Canary Islands. His parents opposed his entering fashion.

== Education ==
Rodriguez graduated from St. Cecilia's High School, a Catholic school in Kearny, New Jersey, in 1979. He studied at Parsons in New York City, where Isaac Mizrahi was a classmate.

== Career ==
=== Early career ===
Rodriguez worked as a design assistant at Calvin Klein before becoming Women's Design Director at Anne Klein. He later worked as a design consultant at Tse Athletics and as design director of Cerruti Arte from 1995 to 1997.

=== Launching the Narciso Rodriguez label (1997) ===
In 1996, Rodriguez designed the wedding dress for Carolyn Bessette-Kennedy, a friend and former Calvin Klein colleague, for her marriage to John F. Kennedy Jr. The dress brought widespread attention to Rodriguez's work; he was subsequently approached by LVMH and launched his own label in 1997. That year, he showed his first fur collection under his own name for Goldin-Feldman in New York.

=== Loewe (1997–2001) ===
From 1997 to 2001, Rodriguez was women's ready-to-wear designer at Loewe.

=== Narciso Rodriguez label (1997–present) ===
In 2003, Rodriguez launched his first fragrance, Narciso Rodriguez for Her, inspired by a bottle of Egyptian musk oil he had been given in high school.

By 2006, Rodriguez had ended his partnership with his label's manufacturer, Aeffe, and was over $1 million in debt to his suppliers; he needed fabric donations for his spring collection. On May 5, 2007, Liz Claiborne acquired a 50% interest in the label. In 2008, Rodriguez bought the stake back for $12 million.

Also in 2008, Rodriguez's designs appeared in the film The Women, worn by the character Mary Haines (Meg Ryan) in a runway scene.

== Notable designs ==
Rodriguez gained widespread attention in 1996 for the wedding dress of Carolyn Bessette, created for her marriage to John F. Kennedy Jr. The bias-cut silk slip was a minimalist departure from the voluminous bridal silhouettes of the era.

Rodriguez designed the wedding gown for his assistant Stephanie Mikesell's marriage to Mark Madoff, eldest son of Bernie Madoff.

On November 4, 2008, Michelle Obama wore a Narciso Rodriguez dress at Grant Park in Chicago when Barack Obama first appeared as president-elect; the dress received substantial press attention. She wore Narciso Rodriguez again for her final State of the Union appearance as First Lady.

== In popular culture ==
Rodriguez is portrayed by Tonatiuh in the 2026 television mini-series Love Story.

== Recognition ==
- 1997 – Best New Designer, Vogue/VH1 Fashion Awards
- 1997 – Perry Ellis Award for Best New Designer, CFDA
- 1997 – Designer of the Year, Hispanic Society of America
- 2002 – Womenswear Designer of the Year, CFDA
- 2003 – Womenswear Designer of the Year, CFDA
- 2007 – Fashion Icon Award, Pratt Institute
