= Givenchy =

French luxury fashion and perfume house

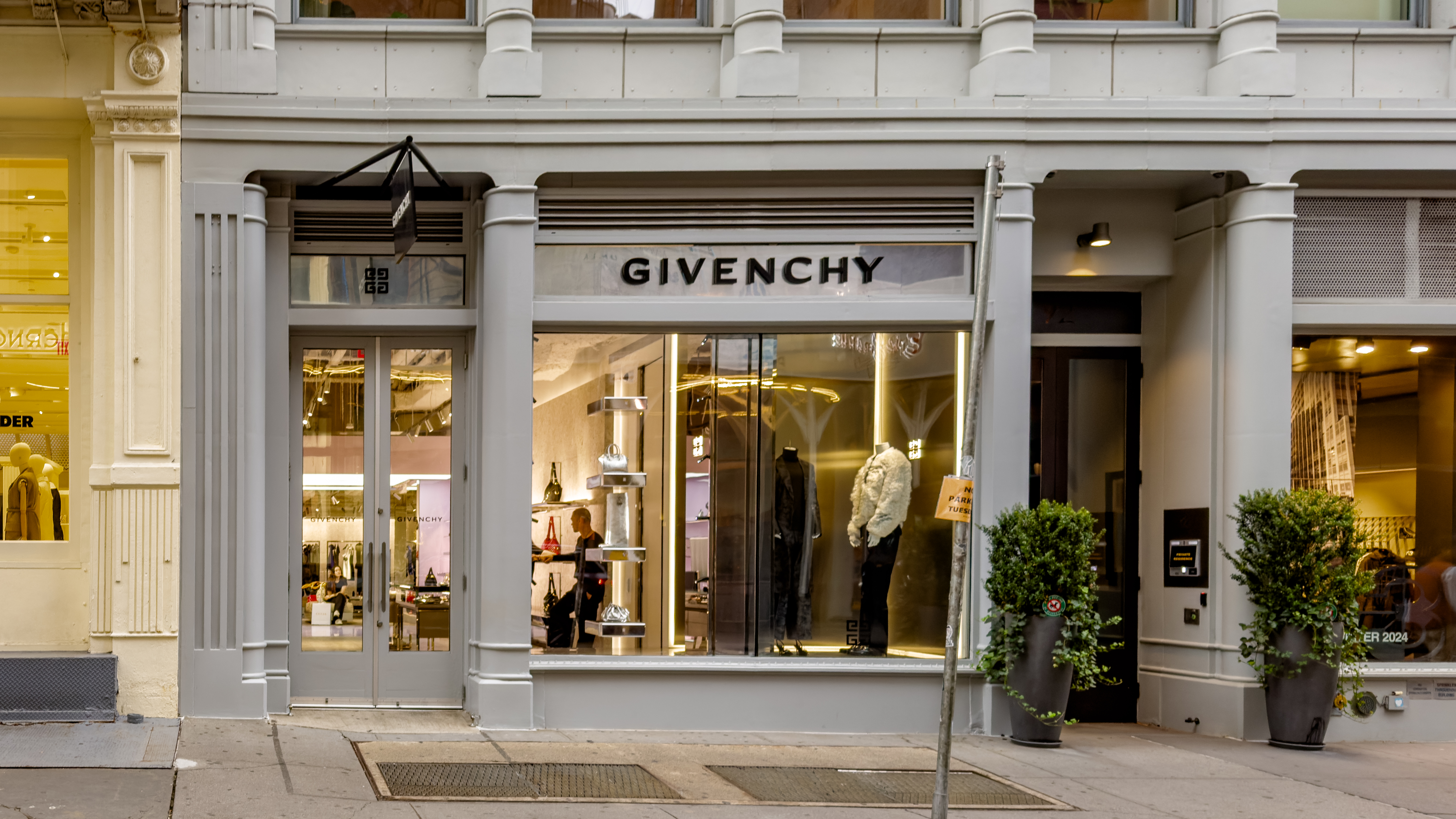
- Store in SoHo, Manhattan
- Type: Subsidiary
- Industry: Fashion
- Founded: 1952; 74 years ago
- Founder: Hubert de Givenchy
- Headquarters: 3 Avenue George V, Paris, France
- Number of locations: 177 stores worldwide (2025)
- Key people: Sarah Burton (Creative Director); Alessandro Valenti (CEO)
- Products: Clothing; Accessories; Perfumes; Cosmetics
- Number of employees: 3800 (2018)
- Parent: LVMH
- Website: givenchy.com

Givenchy (US: /ʒiːvɒ̃ˈʃiː/, French: [ʒivɑ̃ʃi]) is a French luxury fashion and perfume house. It houses the brand of haute couture and ready-to-wear clothing, accessories, perfumes, and cosmetics of Parfums Givenchy. The House of Givenchy was founded in 1952 by designer Hubert de Givenchy and is a member of the Chambre Syndicale de la Haute Couture et du Prêt-à-Porter. It is owned by luxury conglomerate LVMH.

== History ==
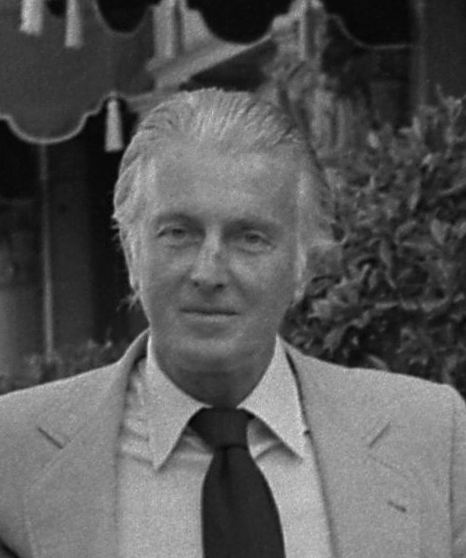
Count Hubert de Givenchy, founder

=== Creative directors and designers ===
- Hubert de Givenchy (1952–1995)
- John Galliano (1995–1996)
- Alexander McQueen (1996–2001)
- Julien Macdonald (2001–2004)
- Riccardo Tisci (2005–2017)
- Clare Waight Keller (2017–2020)
- Matthew Williams (2020–2023)
- Sarah Burton (2024–present)

=== Formation and first years ===
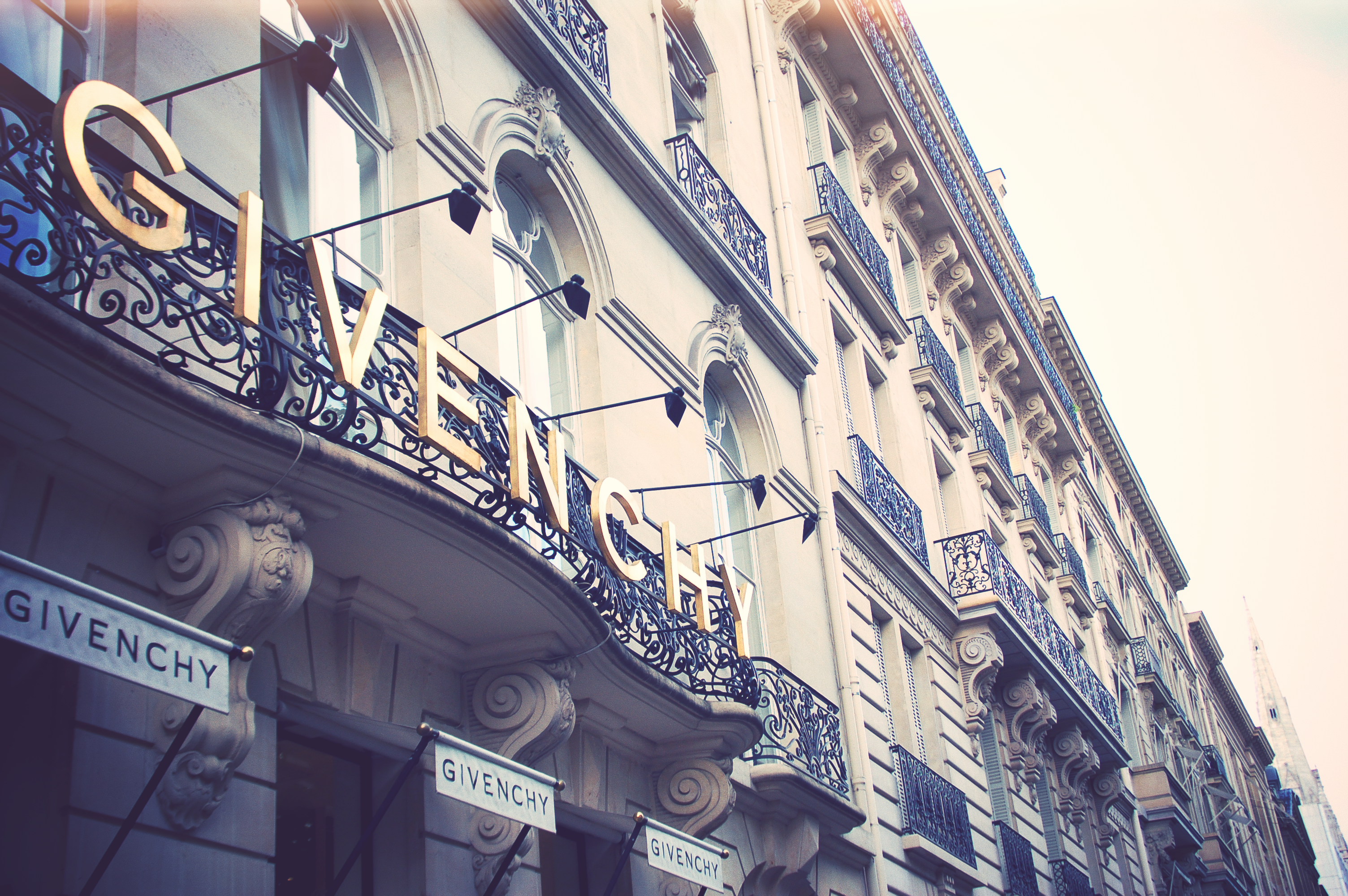
The House of Givenchy

In 1952, Hubert de Givenchy founded his own luxury house and launched a new collection Les Séparables with some floaty skirts and puffy blouses made from raw cotton.

Givenchy achieved critical acclaim with Vogue praising his "wonderful first collection" 14. The collection included the Bettina Blouse a white shirt named in honour of Bettina Graziani, which was then painted in one of René Gruau's works.

The New York Times magazine published an article entitled "A Star Is Born" and l'Album du Figaro also wrote a feature stating that "In one night, Hubert de Givenchy became one of fashion's most famous children with his first collection."

Models such as Suzy Parker and Dorian Leigh became muses of the house.

In terms of innovation, he used 'shirting', a raw cotton similar to pattern paper, to create his chic and casual collections.

In 1954, Hubert de Givenchy presented the first shirt dress (which later evolved in to a sack dress in 1957). He was the first high fashion designer to create a luxury ready-to-wear clothing line, called "Givenchy Université", which was produced in Paris using machinery imported from the United States.

=== 1950s: Balenciaga and Givenchy ===
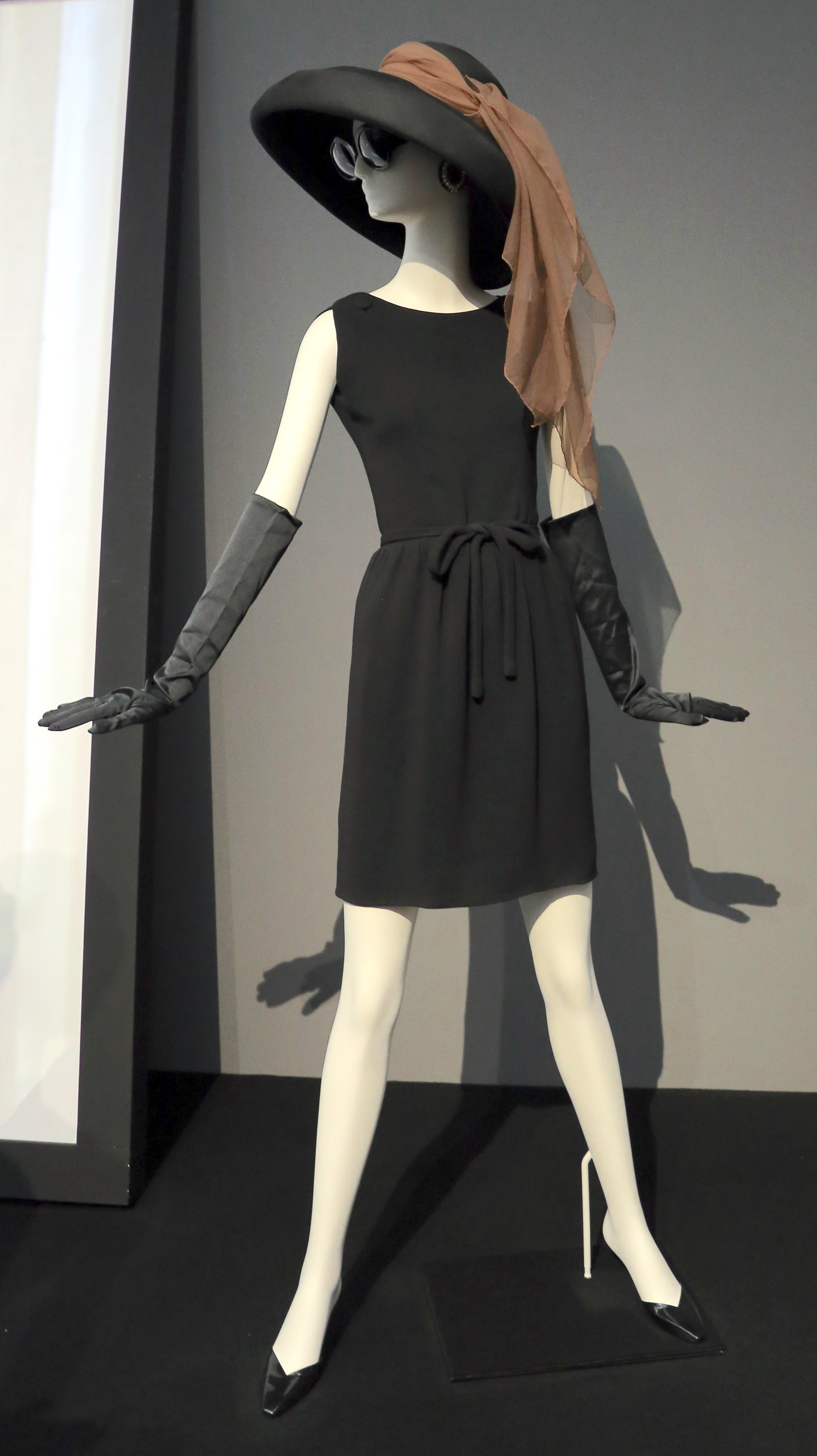
Black Givenchy short dress and hat worn by Audrey Hepburn in the 1961 film Breakfast at Tiffany's

In 1956, both Cristóbal Balenciaga and Hubert de Givenchy presented their collection in New York during a charity gala in aid of the American hospital in Paris.

=== Expansion ===
In 1969, Hubert de Givenchy launched his fashion line for men, "Gentleman Givenchy". The boutique was opened in November on Avenue George V.

On the advice of Cristóbal Balenciaga, Givenchy developed his licences in the 1970s, to protect the Haute Couture collections.

During this period, the House of Givenchy diversified its activities to create shoes, jewellery, ties, tableware, upholstery and kimono. Hubert de Givenchy was chosen to design the interior of Hilton hotels around the world, and even a car (the Continental Mark V).

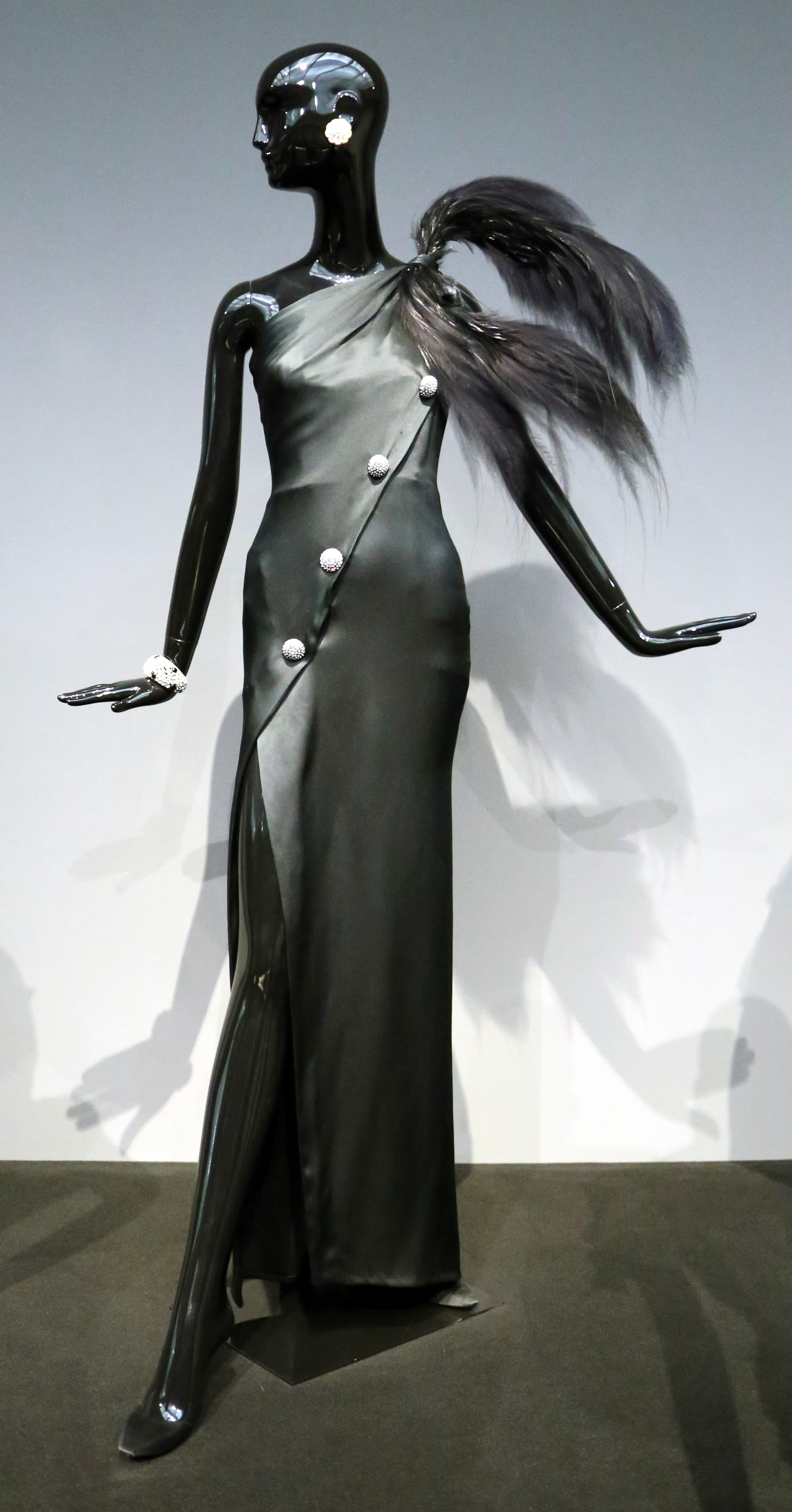
Winter 1990s evening dress by Givenchy

Hubert de Givenchy was elected the personality of the year 1979 and the most elegant man of the year by The Best Magazine.

In 1982, a retrospective presided by Audrey Hepburn was organised by the Fashion Institute of Technology of New York.

The following year Hubert de Givenchy was named « chevalier de la Légion d'Honneur » and in 1985, Jacques Lang, the French minister of the Culture, gave him the Oscar dedicated to the art of elegance during a celebration at the Opera in Paris.

=== Departure of Hubert de Givenchy ===
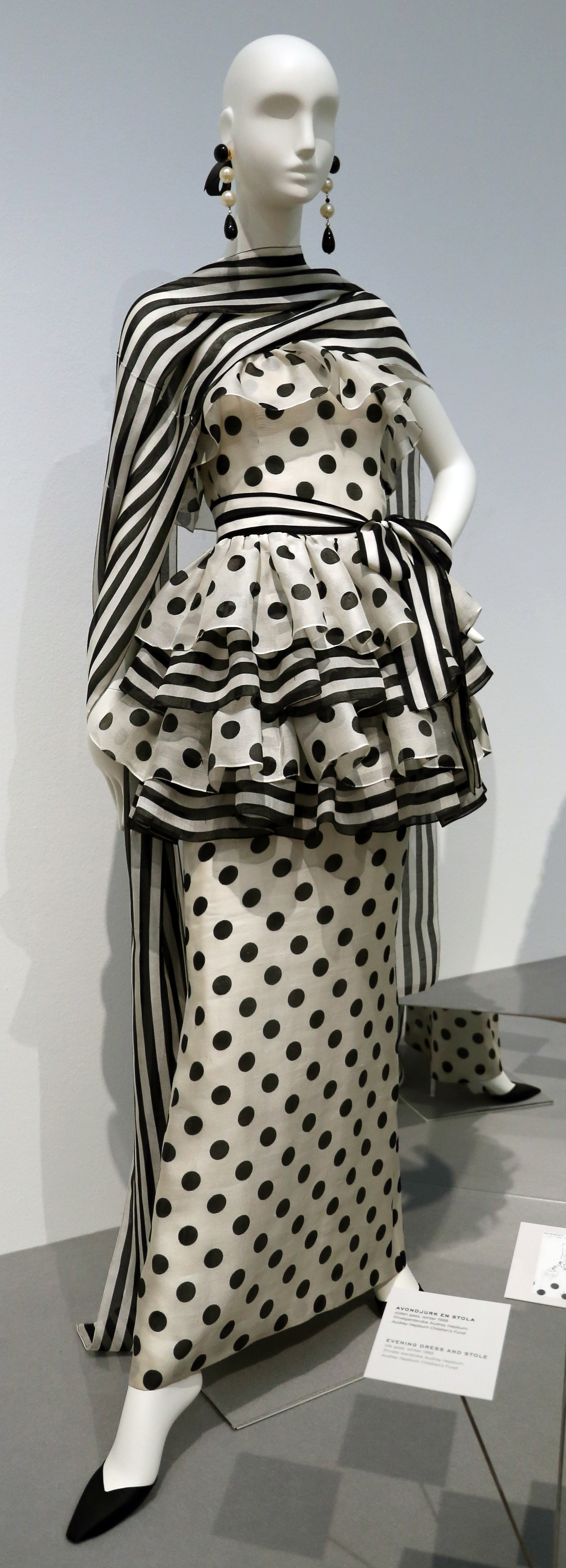
1988 evening dress by Givenchy

In 1988, Givenchy was bought by LVMH.

Hubert de Givenchy retired and left the company in 1995. He was succeeded by a variety of young British creators including John Galliano, Alexander McQueen and Julien Macdonald.

From 2000, the brand's women's line was re-named Givenchy, from Couture Givenchy. The Gentleman Givenchy men's wear line was named Givenchy.

=== 2005–2017, Riccardo Tisci ===
The reins for both collections were passed on to Riccardo Tisci in 2005 when he was named artistic director of womenswear. Tisci introduced his own style and influences, changed the house codes, and added a touch of dark and sensual romanticism.

Philippe Fortunato, the former chief operating of LVMH Moet Hennessy Vuitton SA – China, is the current Chief Operating at Givenchy.

Tisci's Givenchy designs were worn by a number of celebrities on red carpet occasions, including Rooney Mara at the 2012 Academy awards. He was also responsible for working with Madonna designing her costumes for her Sticky & Sweet tour as well as the 2012 Super Bowl Halftime Show.

In February 2017, Riccardo Tisci announced that he would be leaving Givenchy, after twelve years working as the brands Creative Director.

=== 2017–2020, Clare Waight Keller ===
From May 2017 until April 2020, its artistic director was Clare Waight Keller, the first woman to hold that position.

Waight Keller took on all creative responsibilities, including Women's and Men's Ready-to-wear and accessories collections, as well as Haute Couture. Meghan Markle wore a gown from Claire Waight Keller at her wedding to Prince Harry on 19 May 2018.

After successfully running three consecutive combined shows under the assistance of Keller, the brand announced to bring back the menswear collection calendar for the autumn/winter 2019 season.

=== 2020–2023, Matthew Williams ===
In June 2020, Givenchy announced the hiring of Matthew Williams, a stylist and designer best known for co-founding the influential streetwear brand 1017 ALYX 9SM. Williams brought an edgier aesthetic to Givenchy, with his work often seen on celebrities such as Kendall Jenner and Bella Hadid. The commercial and critical response to his work at Givenchy was mixed, with Carine Roitfeld saying she could not identify the Givenchy woman; "it's not a strong DNA." In November 2023, Givenchy announced that Williams will be departing the creative director position at the end of 2023.

=== 2024–present, Sarah Burton ===
In July 2024, Alessandro Valenti is appointed as CEO succeeding to Renaud Lesquen.

British designer Sarah Burton was appointed creative director of the house in September 2024. Her first collection for the house was shown in March 2025, with publications including The New York Times, L'Officiel USA, and Interview saying that Burton reinterpreted and updated the houses heritage for the contemporary woman with The New York Times saying that she "excised the ghost of Audrey [Hepburn] (…) and replaced her with a different kind of woman". The Independent stated that the show was a reset for the brand which had been struggling to find its footing in recent years.

== Other activities ==
In 2001, Givenchy entered into licensing agreements with De Rigo for eyewear and with Rossi Moda for shoes, respectively.

In 2000, Givenchy decided to discontinue Vision, its secondary collection formerly known as Boutiques Givenchy.

== Icons and the cinema ==
=== Audrey Hepburn ===
In 1953, Audrey Hepburn and Hubert de Givenchy met by the intermediary of Gladys de Segonzac in a way to create her costumes for Sabrina by Billy Wilder. As Gladys de Segonzac had organised the meeting with 'Miss Hepburn', the fashion designer thought that he was going to receive Katharine Hepburn. Dressed in a pink and white gingham privateer, a T-shirt and a gondolier hat, the British actress received some prototypes of the future collection. Audrey Hepburn decided to wear Givenchy clothes on and off the screen, such as in Sabrina (1954), Love in the Afternoon (1957), Funny Face (1957), Breakfast at Tiffany's (1961), Charade (1963), Paris When It Sizzles (1963), How to Steal a Million (1965) and Bloodline (1979).

=== Celebrities ===
Givenchy attracted many other celebrities, including the likes of Lauren Bacall, Babe Paley, Michael Norman, Greta Garbo, Elizabeth Taylor, Marlène Dietrich, Jacqueline Kennedy-Onassis, Beyoncé Knowles, Princess Grace of Monaco, Michèle Bennett, and even Wallis Simpson, for whom he created some special garment bags to keep the duchess's orders from being viewed by other clients. The collection of attire (dress, coat, perfume, etc.) furnished for Simpson would later become known as 'blue Wallis'.

Today, Givenchy dresses many Hollywood stars, including Cate Blanchett, Emma Stone, Lady Gaga, Julianne Moore, Julia Roberts, Rooney Mara, and others. In May 2019, Givenchy confirmed that singer Ariana Grande would be the new face of its Fall and Winter campaign that was unveiled that July. On 10 February 2021, K-pop group Aespa became its ambassador, making the group the first K-pop artist chosen as such by the French fashion house.

On 3 February 2025, Japanese boyband Number_i's Yuta Jinguji was appointed as ambassador for the Japanese "Givenchy Beauty" brand.

=== Cinema ===
- In 1958, director Otto Preminger photographed David Niven; Jean Seberg and Deborah Kerr in Givenchy on the shooting of Bonjour Tristesse.
- Beat the Devil (Plus fort que le diable), 1954 realised by John Huston.
- Sabrina, 1954 directed by Billy Wilder, with Audrey Hepburn.
- Love in the afternoon (Ariane), 1957 directed by Billy Wilder, with Audrey Hepburn.
- Funny Face, 1957, directed by Stanley Donen, with Audrey Hepburn.
- La vérité, 1960, directed by Henri-Georges Clouzot.
- Breakfast at Tiffany's 1961, directed by Blake Edwards, with Audrey Hepburn.
- Charade, 1963, directed by Stanley Donen, with Audrey Hepburn.
- Paris When It Sizzles (Deux têtes folles), 1964, directed by Richard Quine, with Audrey Hepburn.
- How to Steal a Million, 1966, directed by William Wyler with Audrey Hepburn.
- Bloodline (Lié par le sang), 1979 directed by Terence Young, with Audrey Hepburn.

== Operations ==
As of 2013, the company's operations were divided between: "Europe accounts for 42 percent of the business, China 18 percent, Asia-Pacific 14 percent, America 12 percent, the Middle East 7 percent, Japan 4 percent, and the rest of the world 3 percent."

== Advertising ==
For its advertising campaigns, Givenchy has been working with photographers like Richard Avedon (1997), Steven Meisel (1998), Craig McDean (1999), David Sims (2000), Annie Leibovitz (2001), Mario Testino (2003), Inez and Vinoodh (2007), Kacper Kasprzyk (2024) and Collier Schorr (2025). The Fall 2010 collection from Givenchy and Riccardo Tisci featured a transgender person for the first time.
