= Clare Waight Keller =

British fashion designer (born 1970)

- Born: Clare Waight; 19 August 1970 (age 56); Birmingham, England
- Education: Ravensbourne University; Royal College of Art
- Occupation: Fashion designer
- Spouse: Philip Keller
- Children: 3

Clare Waight Keller (born 19 August 1970) is a British fashion designer. She has been creative director of Pringle of Scotland and Chloé and artistic director of Givenchy. In 2023, she launched a collection with Japanese mass-market brand Uniqlo.

== Early life and education ==
Waight Keller was born in Birmingham, England, on 19 August 1970. She studied at Ravensbourne College of Art, now Ravensbourne University London, where she graduated with a bachelor's degree in Fashion, followed by a master's degree at the Royal College of Art.

== Career ==
She started her career at Calvin Klein in New York as a designer of women's ready-to-wear, and then designed the Purple Label menswear line at Ralph Lauren. In 2000, she was hired by Tom Ford to join Gucci as a senior designer of women's ready-to-wear and accessories, and she stayed there until 2004. The following year, she became creative director of Pringle of Scotland. In 2007, she received the Scottish Fashion Awards 'Designer of the Year' in the cashmere category. She resigned her position at Pringle of Scotland in 2011. In May 2011 she was named creative director of Chloé in Paris, replacing Hannah MacGibbon. In 2017, Waight Keller was appointed artistic director of haute couture and ready-to-wear for women and men at Givenchy. Replacing Riccardo Tisci, she was the first woman to hold the position at the company.

She designed the wedding dress which Meghan Markle wore for her wedding to Prince Harry, Duke of Sussex, on 19 May 2018.

For her second couture show, Waight Keller went through Givenchy's archives, and used modern materials "to create something that floats". The final purpose of the collection was to commemorate the legacy of the house's founder, Hubert de Givenchy. The show was held at the Archives Nationales in Paris. Guests received a copy of a book with the house's archival designs, including images of Givenchy's muse and creative partner, Audrey Hepburn. The opening design of the collection directly homages Givenchy's column dress created for Audrey. Waight Keller also reinterpreted Hepburn's black dress from Breakfast at Tiffany's and closed the show with the song "Moon River". Despite being a commemorative collection, Waight Keller modernized Givenchy's classic designs with innovative cuts and materials. She also introduced structured, asymmetrical silhouettes and luxurious yet minimalist elements.

In January 2019, for autumn/winter 19, Waight Keller presented her first standalone menswear collection for Givenchy, in Paris. It was a salon show of 17 looks, presenting a complete day-to-evening wardrobe. While future Givenchy ready-to-wear and haute couture shows will remain combined, this means Waight Keller's vision of Givenchy menswear is given its own stage.

She left Givenchy on 10 April 2020.

In August 2023, she announced a line with Uniqlo, Uniqlo : C. The 30-piece collection went on sale on 15 September 2023, online and in more than 1,500 stores worldwide. In September 2024 Uniqlo appointed her creative director, in charge of its core collections as well as Uniqlo : C.

In 2024 Waight Keller consigned clothes from her own archive to the luxury resale platform ReSee and spoke about vintage fashion and rewearing well-made clothes in its Seller Series.

In January 2026 Foundations, the first of a series of short documentaries about Waight Keller's life and career, was released on YouTube. It covers her early years, her time at the Royal College of Art and her first jobs in fashion.

In February 2026 Waight Keller joined the executive board of the British Fashion Council.

=== Awards and honours ===
At the 2016 Elle Style Awards, she received the Editor's Choice award.

At the 2018 British Fashion Awards, Waight Keller won the British Designer of the Year Womenswear Award. It was presented by Meghan, Duchess of Sussex, in a surprise appearance; the actress Rosamund Pike had originally been scheduled to present it.

In 2019, Time magazine included Waight Keller in its annual Time 100 list of the most influential people of the year.

== Personal life ==
She is married to Philip Keller, an architect. They have three children, twins Amelia and Charlotte, and Harrison.
