= Wedding dress of Carolyn Bessette =

Dress worn by Carolyn Bessette at her wedding to John F. Kennedy Jr. in 1996

- Designer: Narciso Rodriguez
- Year: 1996
- Type: Slip
- Material: Silk

The wedding dress worn by Carolyn Bessette at her wedding to John F. Kennedy Jr. on September 21, 1996 was designed by Narciso Rodriguez of Cerruti. The wedding took place on Cumberland Island in the U.S. state of Georgia.

== Design ==
Bessette met designer Narciso Rodriguez during her time working at Calvin Klein. She asked Rodriguez to design her wedding dress while having drinks at The Odeon Restaurant in New York City. Two three-hour couture fittings for the dress took place in Paris. The gown was pearl-white silk crêpe with a cowl décolletage. Rodriguez said, "It's pretty seductive for a wedding dress, wouldn't you say? It shows Carolyn's personality: clean, classic, sexy, seductive." The dress was a gift from Rodriguez and valued around $40,000.

Along with the gown, Bessette wore a long tulle veil, sheer gloves, and crystal-beaded Manolo Blahnik strappy satin sandals. Bessette's bun hairstyle was pinned and held by a clip which had belonged to Jacqueline Kennedy Onassis, John's mother. Her bouquet, arranged by Rachel Lambert Mellon, contained lily of the valley.

== Reception and influence ==
Bessette's gown was positively received by the public and fashion world alike, with women desperately shopping for wedding dresses similar to Bessette's. Alan Millstein, a fashion newsletter editor, stated "Seventh Avenue hasn't had anything like this since Princess Di's wedding."

The dress has been described as "one of the most iconic wedding dresses of the 90s", and as having "been noted in fashion history as breaking ground for minimalist brides". The dress changed the landscape of wedding gowns by inspiring minimalist designs. i-D magazine said the dress' simplicity "marked a departure from the era's voluminous princess dresses and solidified an emerging trend: the understated slip-style wedding dress". Vogue said the dress "may be one of the most sought-after gowns of all time. [Bessette] hands-down changed the wedding dress game—making it acceptable and desirable to wear something refined and simple: a white silk slip rather than princess-y tulle and an embellished gown." Women's Wear Daily said the gown "shifted bridal fashion into a new, modernist era".

The dress launched the career of designer Narciso Rodriguez.

Meghan Markle described Bessette's gown as "everything goals". Markle's wedding dress at her wedding to Prince Harry of the United Kingdom in 2018 was likened to a formal dress Bessette-Kennedy wore in 1998, and her wedding reception dress was described as "reminiscent" of Bessette's wedding gown.

In a 25th anniversary retrospective for Vogue in 2021, contributors praised the simplicity and timelessness of the dress, with former Harper's Bazaar editor in chief Kate Betts calling it "revolutionary". Fashion journalist Zanna Roberts Rassi stated, "It has held up more than most dresses; it's perhaps better today than it was then. How many dresses can we say get better and better? It has had a massive cultural impact, particularly with the new generation." Style expert Stacy London said, "Something about that dress transcends trends and time—almost no bridal establishment would say they don't have at least one dress that resembles it. It has become a cultural touchstone."

== See also ==
- List of individual dresses
