= Emilia Wickstead =

New Zealand fashion designer

- Born: June 1983 (age 42–43); Auckland, New Zealand
- Education: Central Saint Martins
- Occupation: fashion designer
- Notable work: for Samantha Cameron, The Princess of Wales
- Mother: Angela Wickstead
- Awards: Red Carpet Designer of the Year Award (2014)

Emilia Wickstead (born June 1983) is a New Zealand fashion designer based in London, England. In 2014 she won the Red Carpet Designer of the Year Award at the Elle Style Awards, and her clients include Samantha Cameron and the Princess of Wales.

== Early life ==
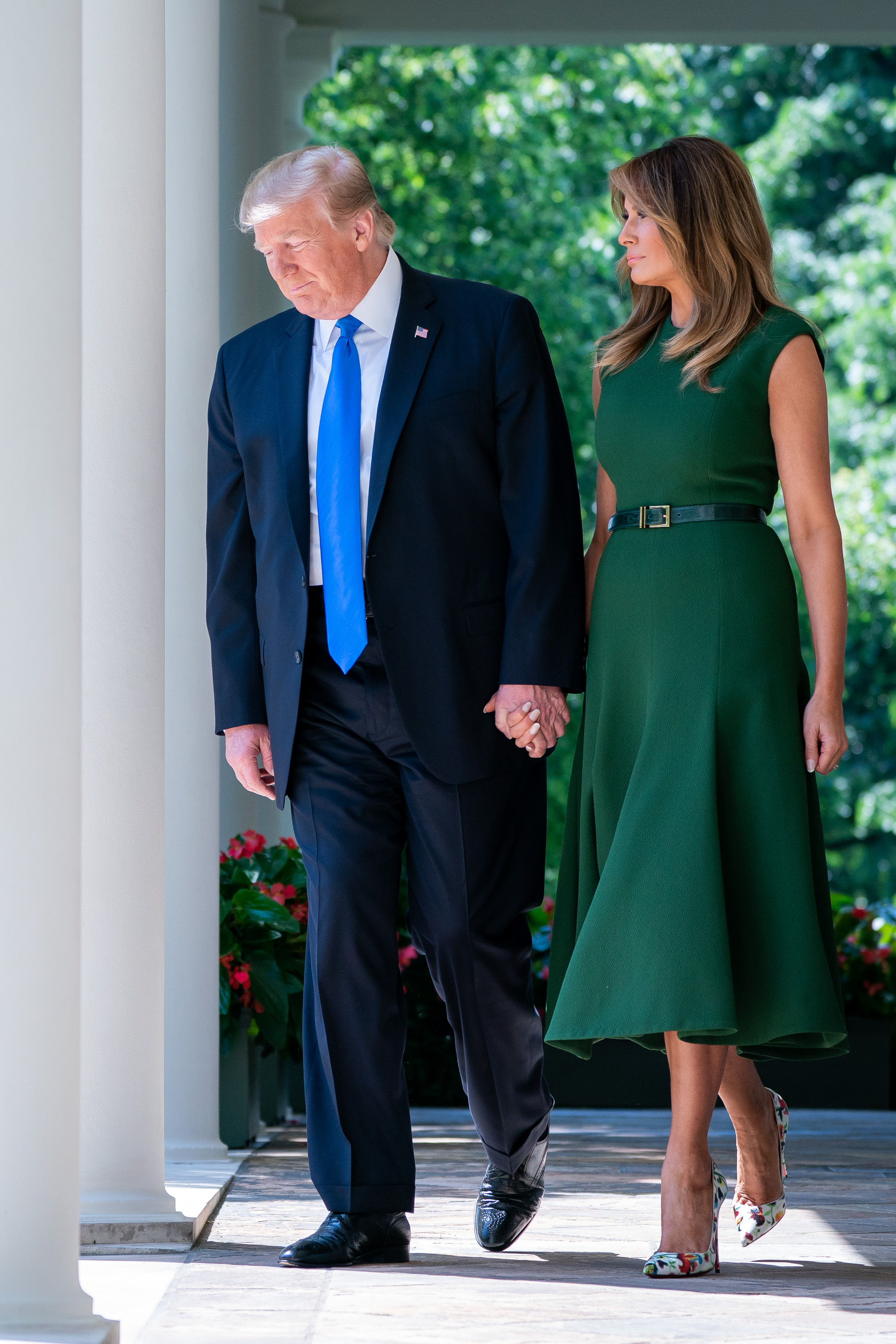
Melania Trump in a forest green Emilia Wickstead crepe dress, May 2019

Wickstead was born in June 1983, in Auckland, New Zealand, to Angela Wickstead, a designer with a boutique in Parnell. At the age of 14, she moved to Milan, Italy, with her mother. Wickstead studied fashion design and marketing at Central Saint Martins art school in London and interned in New York at Giorgio Armani and Vogue magazine.

== Career ==
At the age of 24, Wickstead's boyfriend gave her £5,000 to start her business. She created a small collection of clothes and held showings for family and friends in her living room, taking orders for made-to-measure items. Her work was featured in Tatler and UK Vogue magazines, and she was able to expand, opening a store in Belgravia, and employing a team of seamstresses. She had her first showing at London Fashion Week in 2012, and holds shows and consultations in New Zealand, New York and Milan.

Wickstead's style has been described as "graceful", "understated elegance" and her choice of colours as "pretty but not saccharine". Among those who have worn her designs are Catherine, Princess of Wales, Samantha Cameron and Melania Trump. In May 2018, Wickstead claimed that the wedding dress of Meghan Markle was "identical" to one of her designs.

In November 2023, Air New Zealand announced that Wickstead would be their "future uniform designer". The new crew uniforms, with prints designed by Māori artist Te Rangitu Netana, were introduced in April 2025.

=== Recognition ===
- Shortlisted for the BFC/Vogue Fashion Fund in 2013, 2014, 2015 and 2016
- Shortlisted for a British Fashion Award for New Establishment Designer in 2014 and 2015
- Won the Walpole Award for Brands of Tomorrow 2015
- Shortlisted for the Veuve Clicquot Business Woman Award 2015
- Won Elle magazine's Style Award for Red Carpet Designer of the Year 2014
- BFC Fashion Trust recipient 2014.
