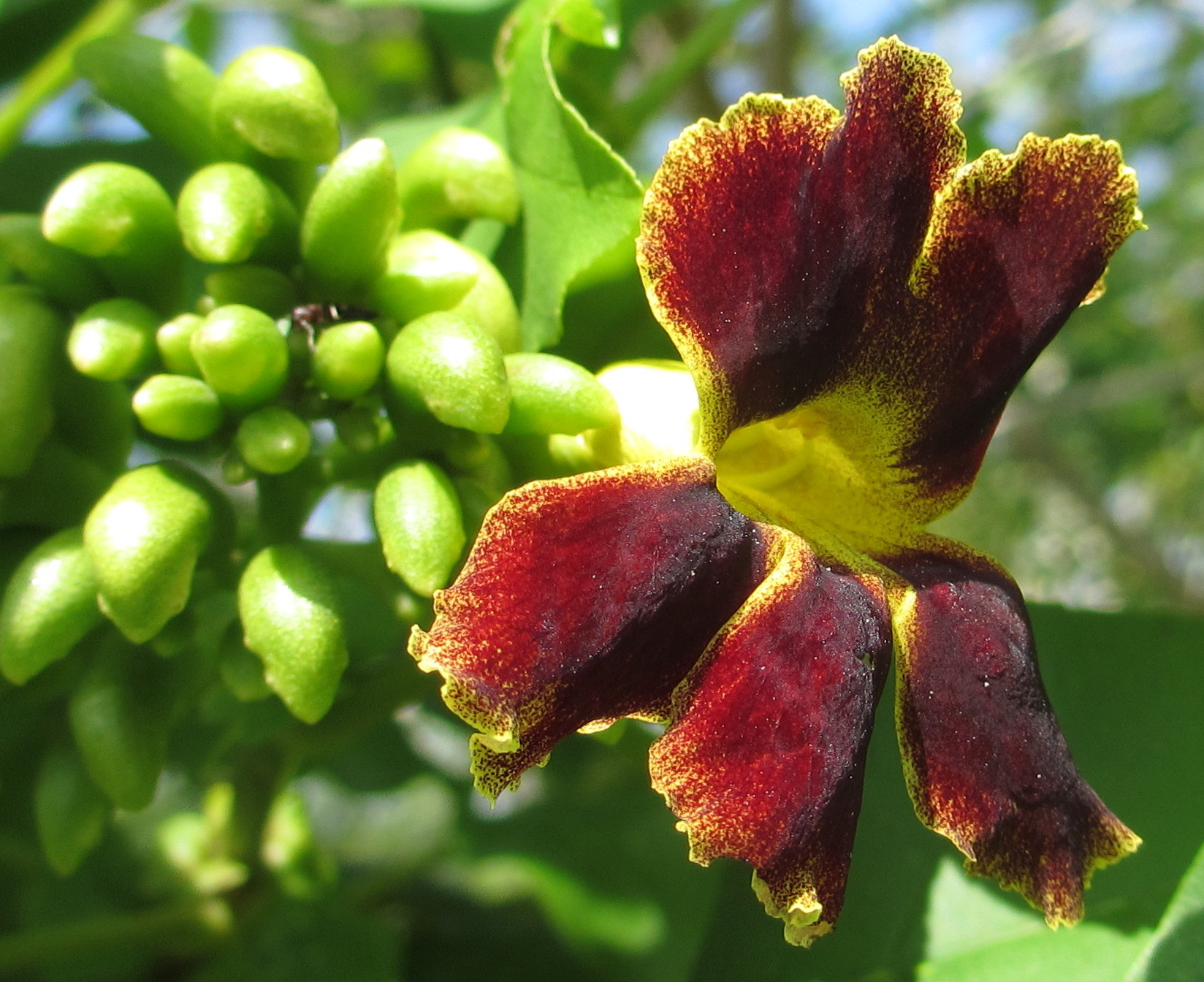
- Markhamia zanzibarica flower and buds

Conservation status
- Least Concern (IUCN 3.1)

Scientific classification
- Kingdom: Plantae
- Clade: Tracheophytes
- Clade: Angiosperms
- Clade: Eudicots
- Clade: Asterids
- Order: Lamiales
- Family: Bignoniaceae
- Genus: Markhamia
- Species: M. zanzibarica

Binomial name
- Markhamia zanzibarica (Bojer ex DC.) K.Schum

Synonyms
- Dolichandrone hirsuta Baker; Dolichandrone latifolia Baker; Dolichandrone stenocarpa Baker; Markhamia acuminata (Klotzsch) K.Schum.; Markhamia puberula (Klotzsch) K.Schum.; Markhamia stenocarpa (Baker) K.Schum.; Muenteria puberula Seem.; Muenteria stenocarpa Seem.; Muenteria zanzibarica (Bojer ex DC.) Seem.; Spathodea acuminata Klotzsch; Spathodea puberula Klotzsch; Spathodea stenocarpa Welw.; Spathodea zanzibarica Bojer ex DC.

= Markhamia zanzibarica =

Species of flowering plant

Markhamia zanzibarica, also known as bell bean tree or maroon bell-bean, is a species of plant in the family Bignoniaceae. It is found in East Africa and Southern Africa, from Kenya to South Africa.

== Description ==
This species usually grows as small tree, and thrives in areas that are lightly forested, such as fields. It is known to grow in riverine fringes and rocky outcrops. Flowers are yellow. The fruit is a long capsule.

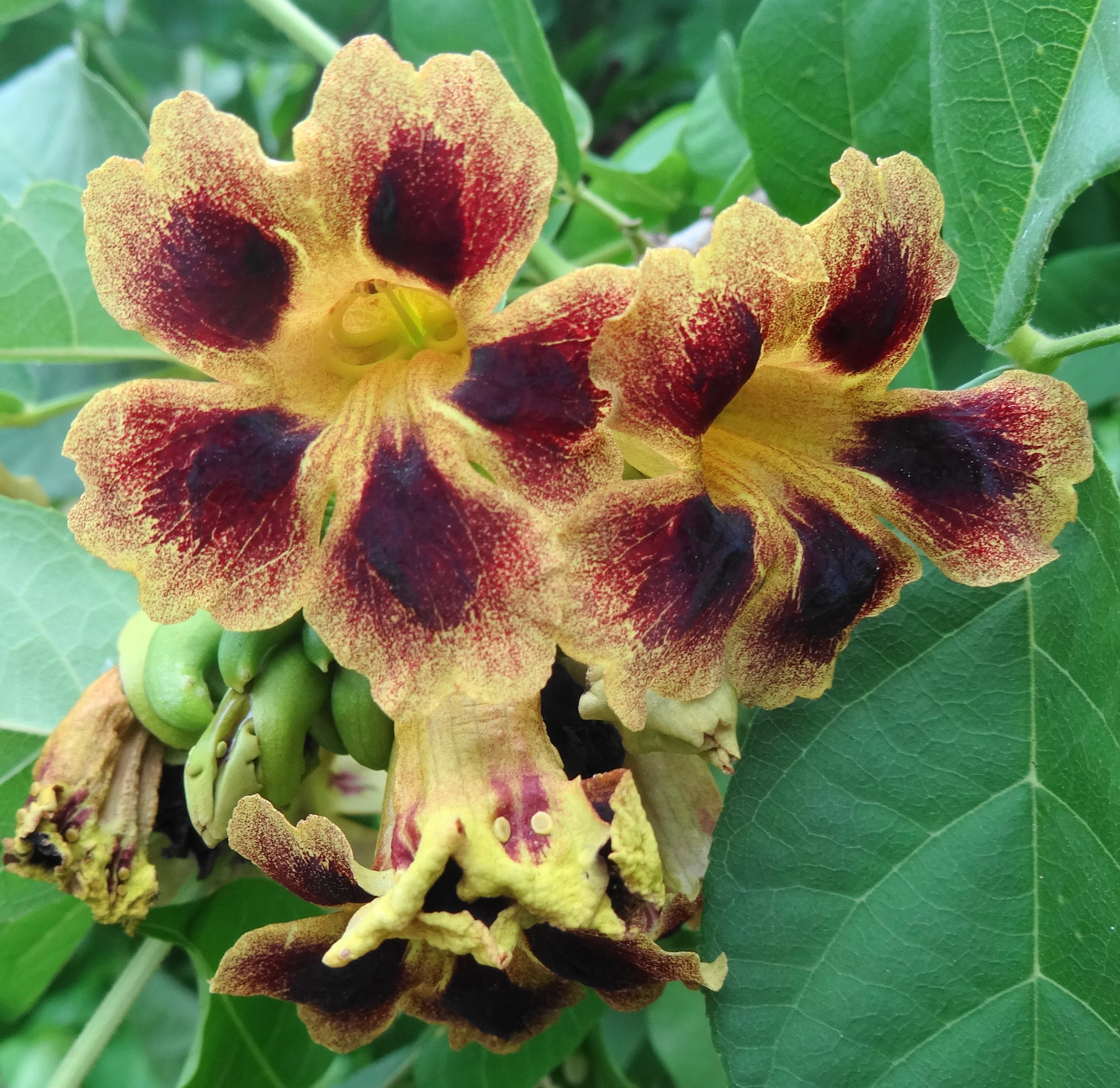
Flowers in Pemba, Mozambique
