= Spachea elegans =

Conservation status
- Least Concern (IUCN 3.1)

Scientific classification
- Kingdom: Plantae
- Clade: Tracheophytes
- Clade: Angiosperms
- Clade: Eudicots
- Clade: Rosids
- Order: Malpighiales
- Family: Malpighiaceae
- Genus: Spachea
- Species: S. elegans

Binomial name
- Spachea elegans (G.Mey.) A.Juss.

Synonyms
- Byrsonima elegans (G.Mey.) DC.; Malpighia elegans G.Mey.; Byrsonima herbert-smithii Rusby; Spachea herbert-smithii (Rusby) Cuatrec.; Spachea littoralis A.Juss.; Spachea ossana A.Juss.; Spachea parviflora A.Juss.; Spachea perforata A.Juss.

Species of flowering plant

Spachea elegans is a species of flowering plants in the family Malpighiaceae. It is native to Cuba, Panama and northern South America (including Brazil and Trinidad and Tobago).
