= Spachea =

Scientific classification
- Kingdom: Plantae
- Clade: Tracheophytes
- Clade: Angiosperms
- Clade: Eudicots
- Clade: Rosids
- Order: Malpighiales
- Family: Malpighiaceae
- Genus: Spachea; A.Juss.

Synonyms
- Andersoniella C.Davis & Amorim, nom. illeg.; Andersoniodoxa C.Davis & Amorim; Lophanthera A.Juss.; Meckelia (Mart. ex A.Juss.) Griseb.

Genus of flowering plants

Spachea is a genus in the family Malpighiaceae. Spachea comprises 11 species of shrubs and trees growing in wet forests of the tropical Americas, from northern Brazil and Peru to Nicaragua, Cuba, and Trinidad.

Spachea perforata (now Spachea elegans), common name soufriere tree, is the national flower of St. Vincent and the Grenadines.

== Species ==
As of October 2025, Plants of the World Online accepted these species:

- Spachea correae Cuatrec. & Croat – southeastern Nicaragua, Costa Rica, and Panama
- Spachea elegans (G.Mey.) A.Juss. – northern Brazil to Panama, Trinidad, and Cuba
- Spachea hammelii (W.R.Anderson) R.F.Almeida & M.Pell. – Costa Rica
- Spachea lactescens (Ducke) R.F.Almeida & M.Pell. – northern Brazil
- Spachea longifolia (Kunth) R.F.Almeida & M.Pell. – Venezuela and northern Brazil
- Spachea marcelae (W.R.Anderson) R.F.Almeida & M.Pell. – Colombia
- Spachea martiana Acuña & Roig – eastern Cuba
- Spachea membranacea Cuatrec. – Colombia and Panama
- Spachea pendula (Ducke) R.F.Almeida & M.Pell. – northern Brazil
- Spachea spruceana (Nied.) R.F.Almeida & M.Pell. – southeastern Colombia and northern Brazil
- Spachea tricarpa A.Juss. – southeastern Colombia, Ecuador, Peru, and northern Brazil
