= Stewart Parvin =

British fashion designer (born 1966)

- Born: September 1966 (age 60); Wokingham, Berkshire, England
- Education: Edinburgh College of Art
- Occupation: Fashion designer
- Known for: Couture gowns
- Awards: Royal Victorian Order

Stewart Charles Reginald Parvin MVO (born September 1966) is a British fashion designer, best known for his couture gowns.

== Early life and education ==
Stewart Parvin was born in September 1966, in Wokingham, Berkshire, to Dennis and Juliana V. Parvin nee Barker. He has a sister Amelia born 1971. He studied fashion at the Edinburgh College of Art.

== Career ==
Parvin worked for the couturier Donald Campbell, before starting his own Stewart Parvin label in 1995.

Parvin had been designing clothes for Queen Elizabeth II since 2007, and in March 2016, the Queen presented him with the Royal Victorian Order (RVO) whilst wearing a Parvin purple patterned day dress, specially designed for the occasion.

Parvin has designed dresses for notable personalities like Zara Tindall, Meghan Markle, and Queen Elizabeth. He was honored as a royal dressmaker by the Queen for her dressing at in an event at Buckingham Palace.

In January 2018, Parvin was the bookmakers' favourite to design Meghan Markle's dress for her wedding to Prince Harry on 19 May 2018.

== Philanthropy ==
In response to COVID 19, Parvin designed and donated scrubs to NHS workers, Frimley Park Hospital being the first receiver. According to Parvin, Anita at Classic Textiles donated the fabric required for production of the dresses and some of his workers volunteered for the cause.
